= Visual arts of the Indigenous peoples of the Americas =

Visual arts by indigenous peoples of the Americas

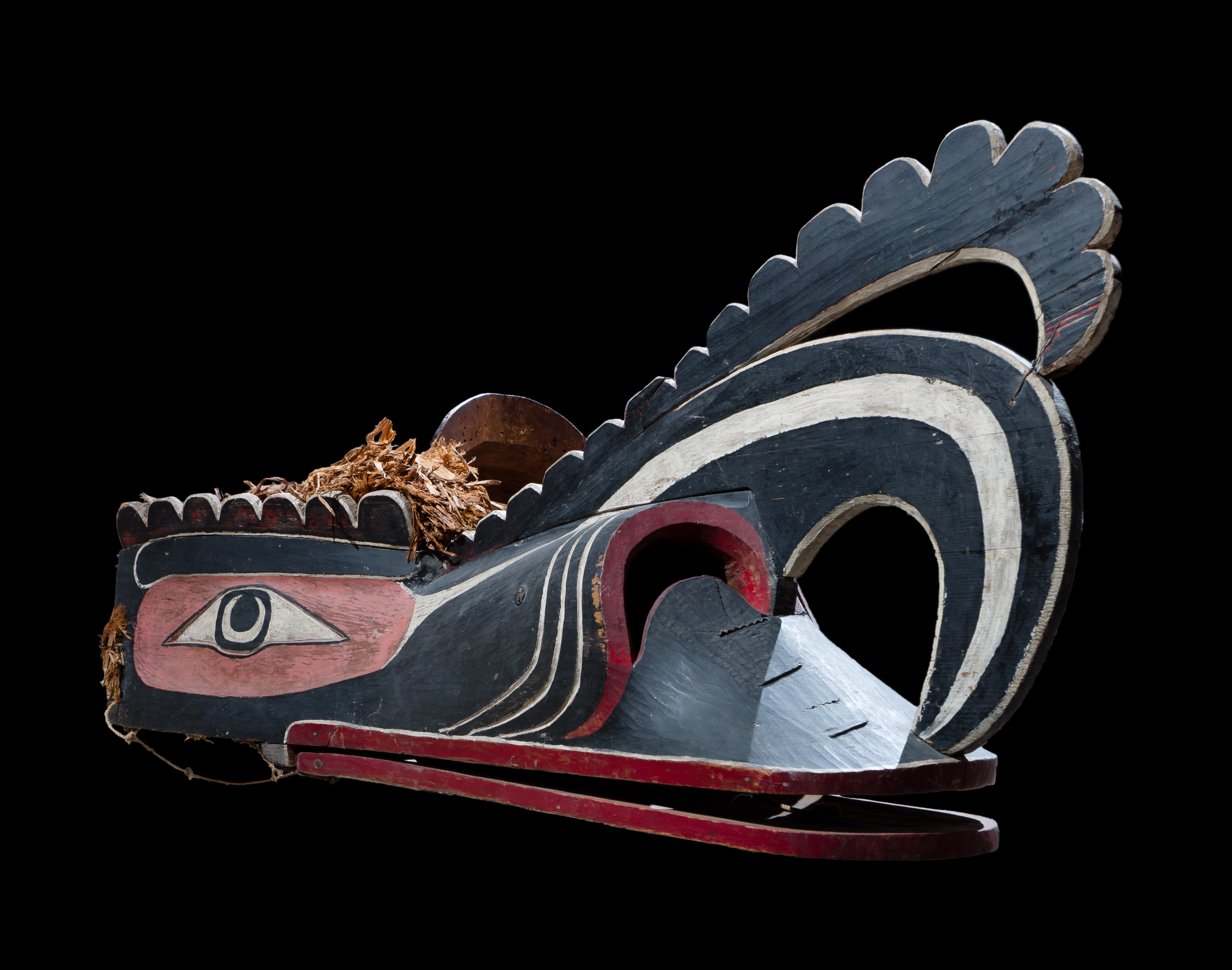
Crooked Beak of Heaven Mask, Kwakwakaʼwakw, 19th century

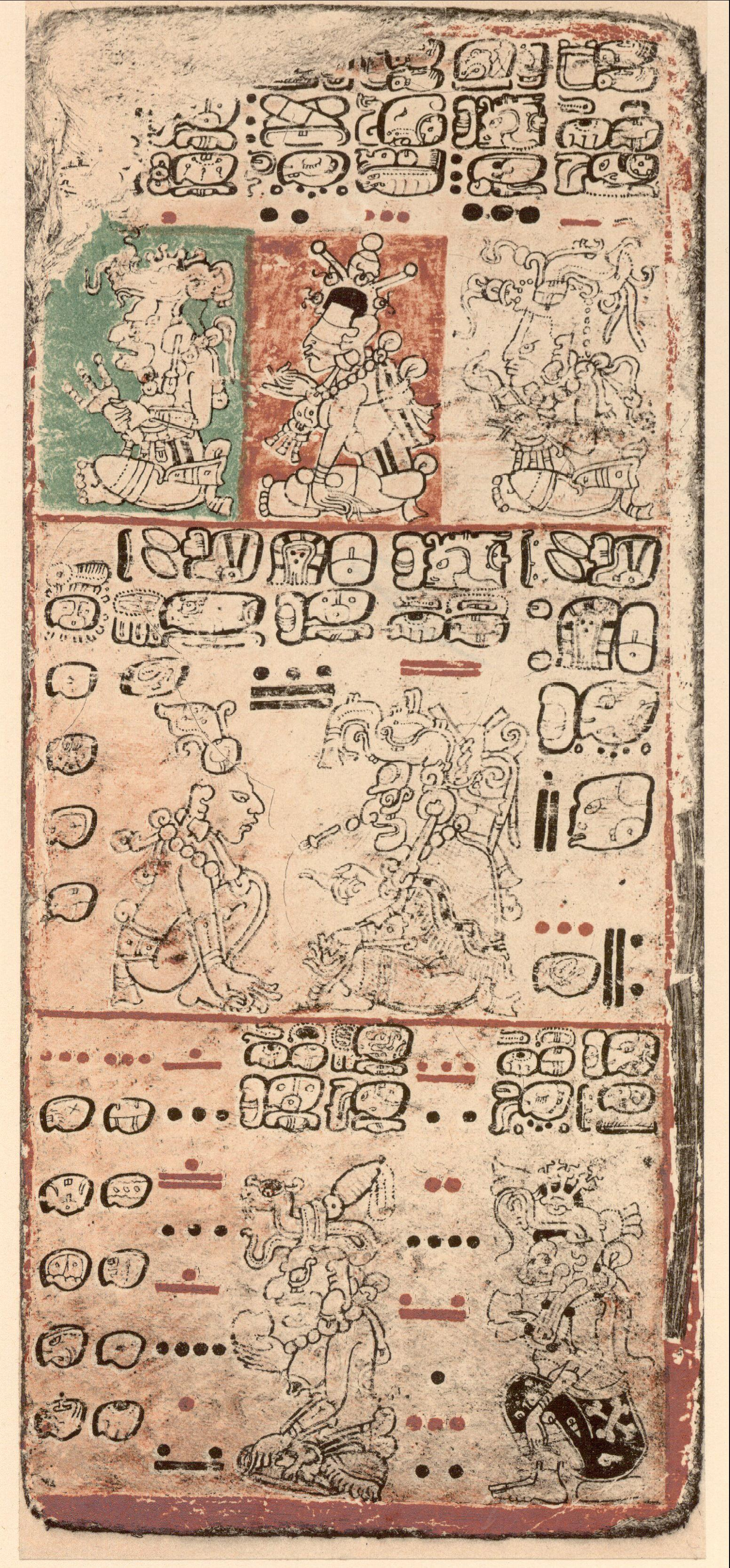
Dresden Codex, Maya, circa 11th or 12th century

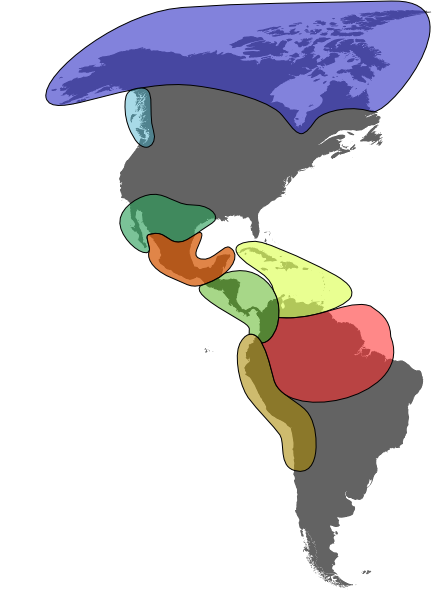
Major cultural areas of the pre-Columbian Americas: Arctic Northwest Aridoamerica Mesoamerica Isthmo-Colombian Caribbean Amazon Andes. This map does not show Greenland, which is part of the Arctic cultural area.

The visual arts of the Indigenous peoples of the Americas encompasses the visual artistic practices of the Indigenous peoples of the Americas from ancient times to the present. These include works from South America and North America, which includes Central America and Greenland. The Siberian Yupiit, who have great cultural overlap with Native Alaskan Yupiit, are also included.

Indigenous American visual arts include portable arts, such as painting, basketry, textiles, or photography, as well as monumental works, such as architecture, land art, public sculpture, or murals. Some Indigenous art forms coincide with Western art forms; however, some, such as porcupine quillwork or birchbark biting are unique to the Americas.

Indigenous art of the Americas has been collected by Europeans since sustained contact in 1492 and joined collections in cabinets of curiosities and early museums. More conservative Western art museums have classified Indigenous art of the Americas within arts of Africa, Oceania, and the Americas, with precontact artwork classified as pre-Columbian art, a term that sometimes refers to only precontact art by Indigenous peoples of Latin America. Native scholars and allies are striving to have Indigenous art understood and interpreted from Indigenous perspectives.

== Lithic and Archaic stage ==
The Lithic stage or Paleo-Indian period is defined as approximately 18,000 to 8,000 BCE. The period from around 8000 to 800 BCE is generally referred to as the Archaic period. While people of this time period worked in a wide range of materials, perishable materials, such as plant fibers or hides, had seldom been preserved through the millennia. Indigenous peoples created bannerstones, Projectile point, Lithic reduction styles, and pictographic cave paintings, some of which have survived in the present.

Belonging in the lithic stage, the oldest known art in the Americas is a fossilized megafauna bone, possibly from a mammoth, carved with a profile of walking mammoth or mastodon that dates back to 11,000 BCE. The bone was found early in the 21st century near Vero Beach, Florida, in an area where human bones (Vero man) had been found in association with extinct pleistocene animals early in the 20th century. The bone is too mineralized to be dated, but the carving has been authenticated as having been made before the bone became mineralized. The anatomical correctness of the carving and the heavy mineralization of the bone indicate that the carving was made while mammoths and/or mastodons still lived in the area, more than 10,000 years ago.

The oldest known painted object in North America is the Cooper Bison Skull from approximately 8,050 BCE. Lithic age art in South America includes Monte Alegre culture rock paintings created at Caverna da Pedra Pintada dating back to 9250 to 8550 BCE. Guitarrero Cave in Peru has the earliest known textiles in South America, dating to 8000 BCE.

The southwestern United States and certain regions of the Andes have the highest concentration of pictographs (painted images) and Petroglyphs (carved images) from this period. Both pictographs and petroglyphs are known as rock art.

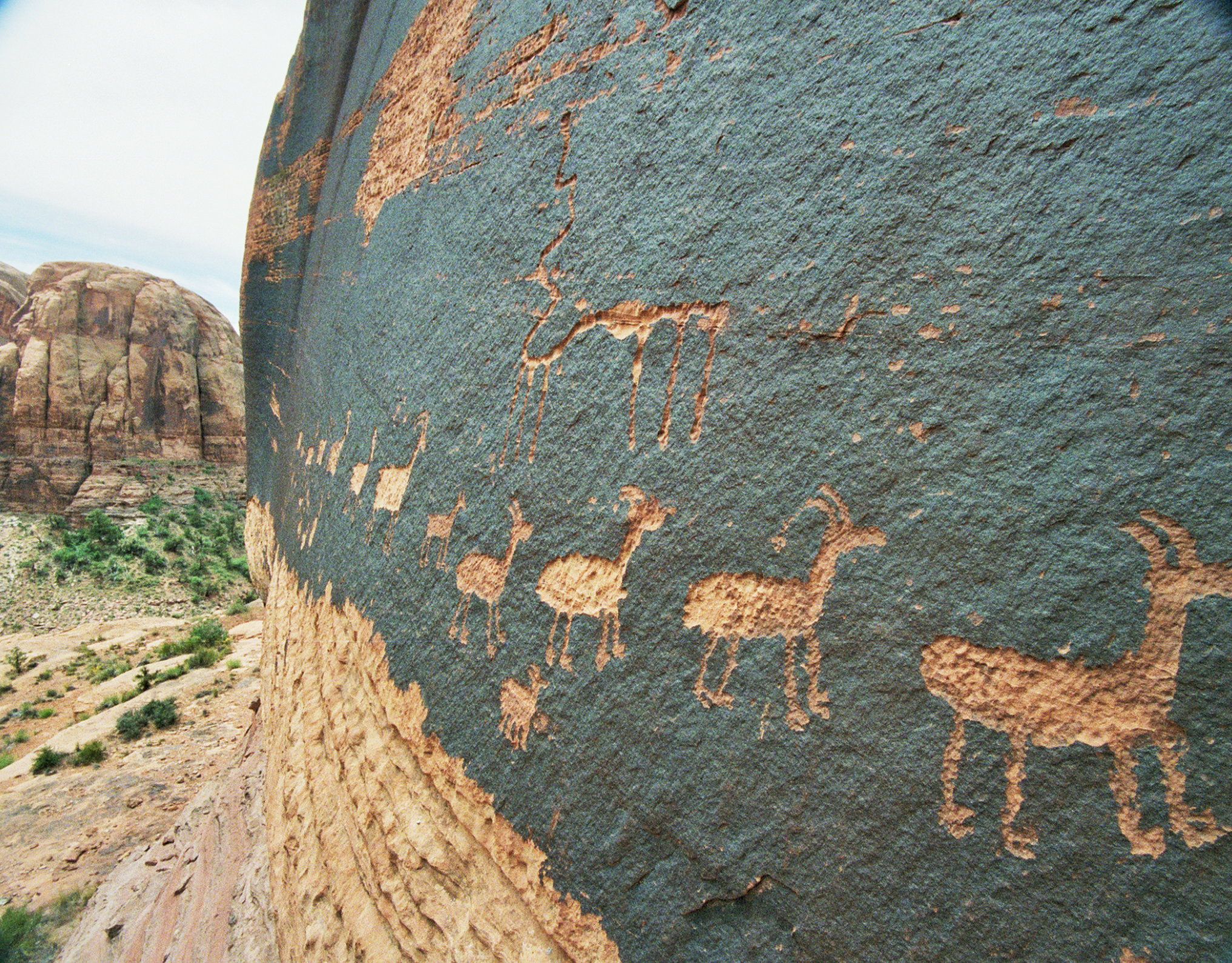
A petroglyph of a caravan of bighorn sheep near Moab, Utah, United States; a common theme in glyphs from the southwestern desert

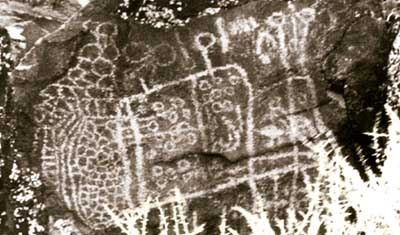
Archaic abstract curvilinear style petroglyphs, Coso Rock Art District, California

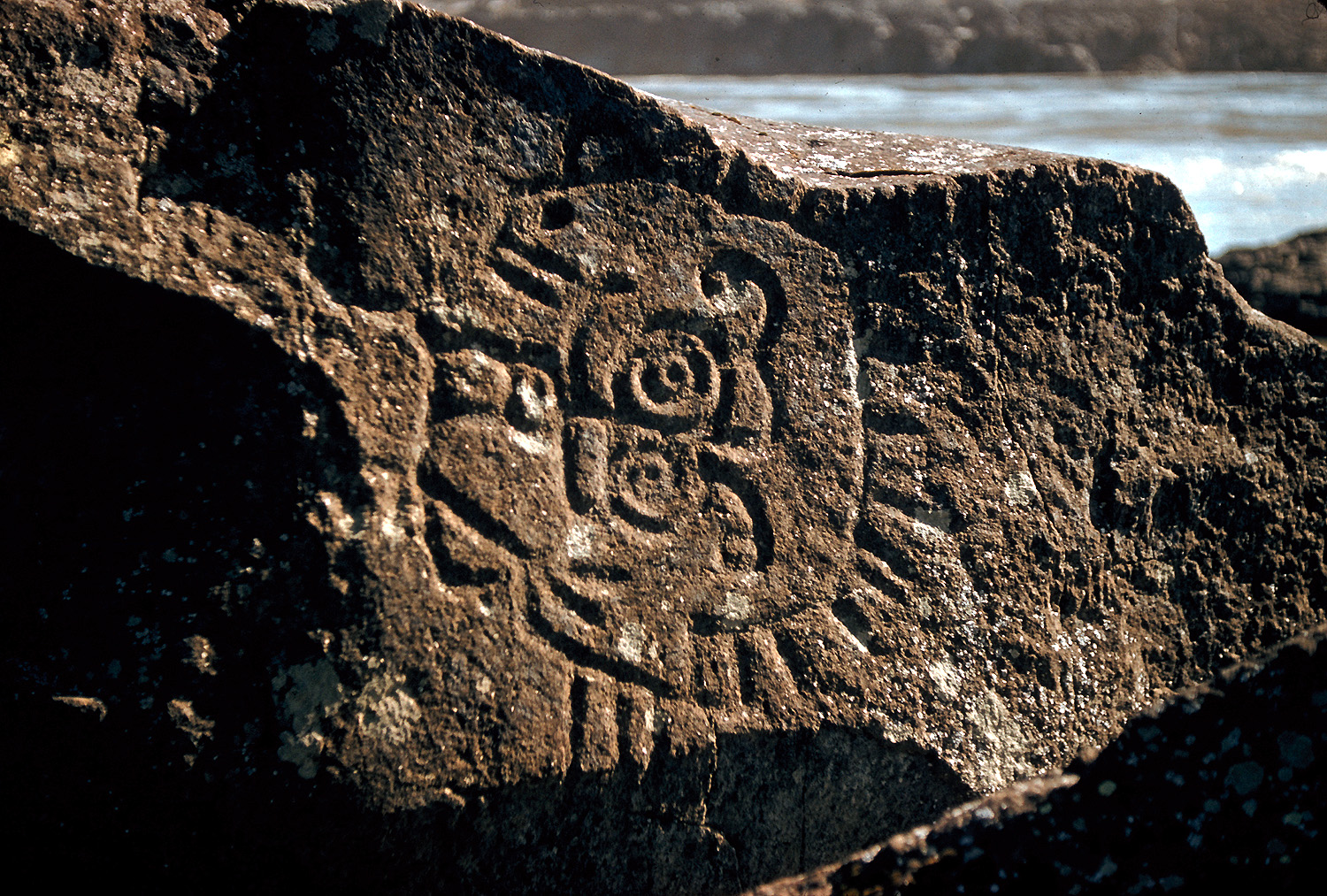
Petroglyph from Columbia River Gorge, Washington, United States

== North America ==
=== Arctic ===
The Yup'ik of Alaska have a long tradition of carving masks for use in shamanic rituals. Indigenous peoples of the Canadian arctic have produced objects that could be classified as art since the time of the Dorset culture. While the walrus ivory carvings of the Dorset were primarily ceremonial, the art of the Thule people who replaced them circa 1000 CE was more decorative in character.

European contact dramatically changed Inuit art-making. In the late 19th century, Inuit artisans created souvenirs for the crews of whaling ships and explorers. Common examples include cribbage boards. Modern Inuit art began in the late 1940s, when with the encouragement of the Canadian government they began to produce prints and serpentine sculptures for sale in the south. In the mid-20th-century, Inuit printmaking emerged as a significant genre after James A. Houston created a printmaking studio in Kinngait in 1957.

Greenlandic Inuit have a unique textile tradition integrating skin-sewing, furs, and appliqué of small pieces of brightly dyed marine mammal organs in mosaic designs, called avittat. Women create elaborate netted beadwork collars. They have strong mask-making tradition and also are known for an art form called tupilaq or an "evil spirit object." Traditional art making practices thrive in the Ammassalik. Sperm whale ivory remains a valued medium for carving.

Inuit art from Alaska, Canada, and Greenland

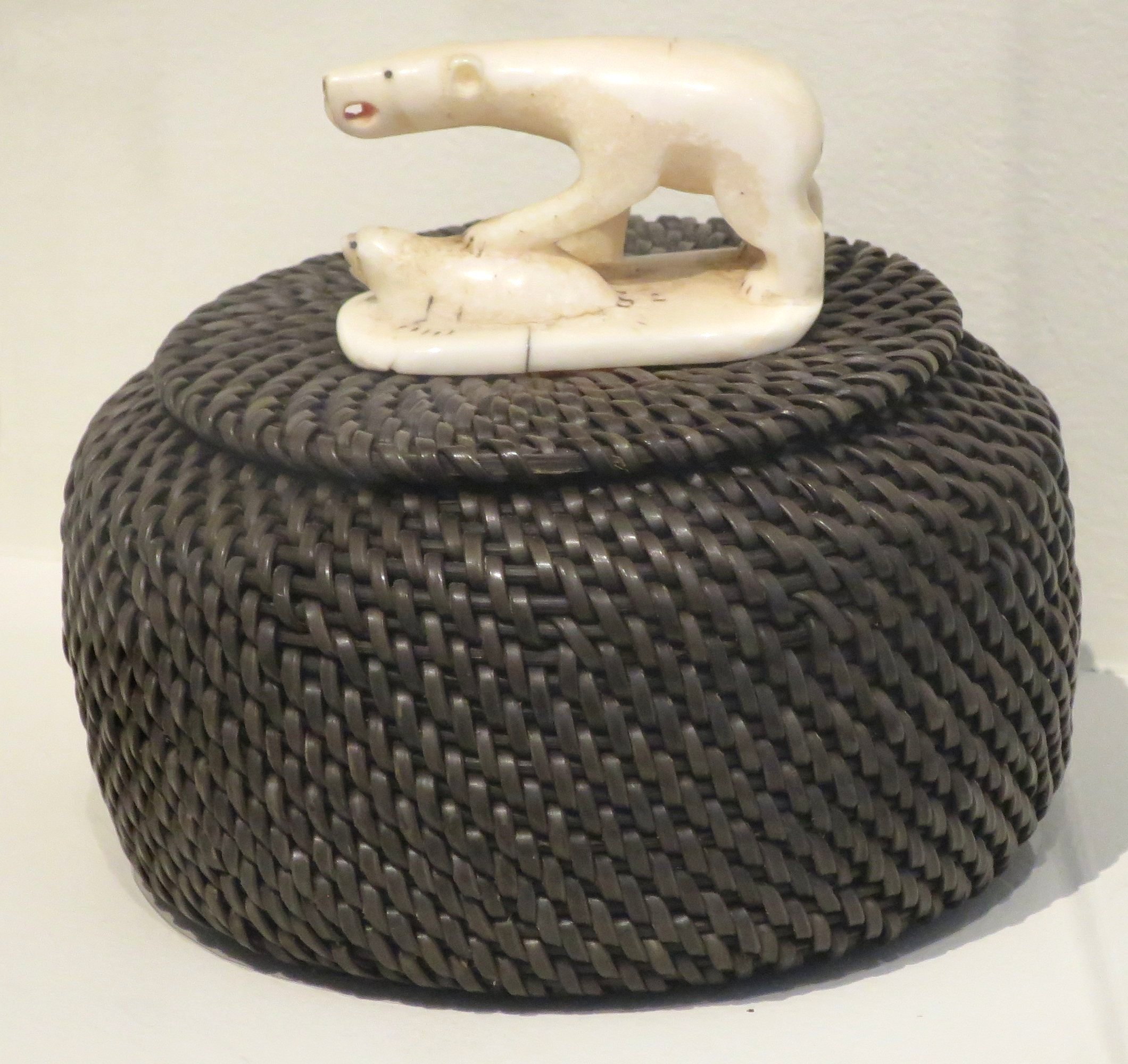
Baleen basket with whale tooth finial, by George Omnik (Iñupiaq, 1905–1978), Alaska; Honolulu Museum of Art (Hawaii, USA)

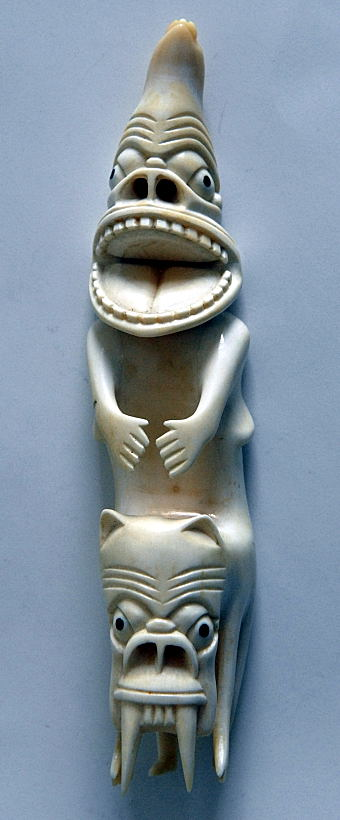
A carved representation of a tupilaq, from Greenland

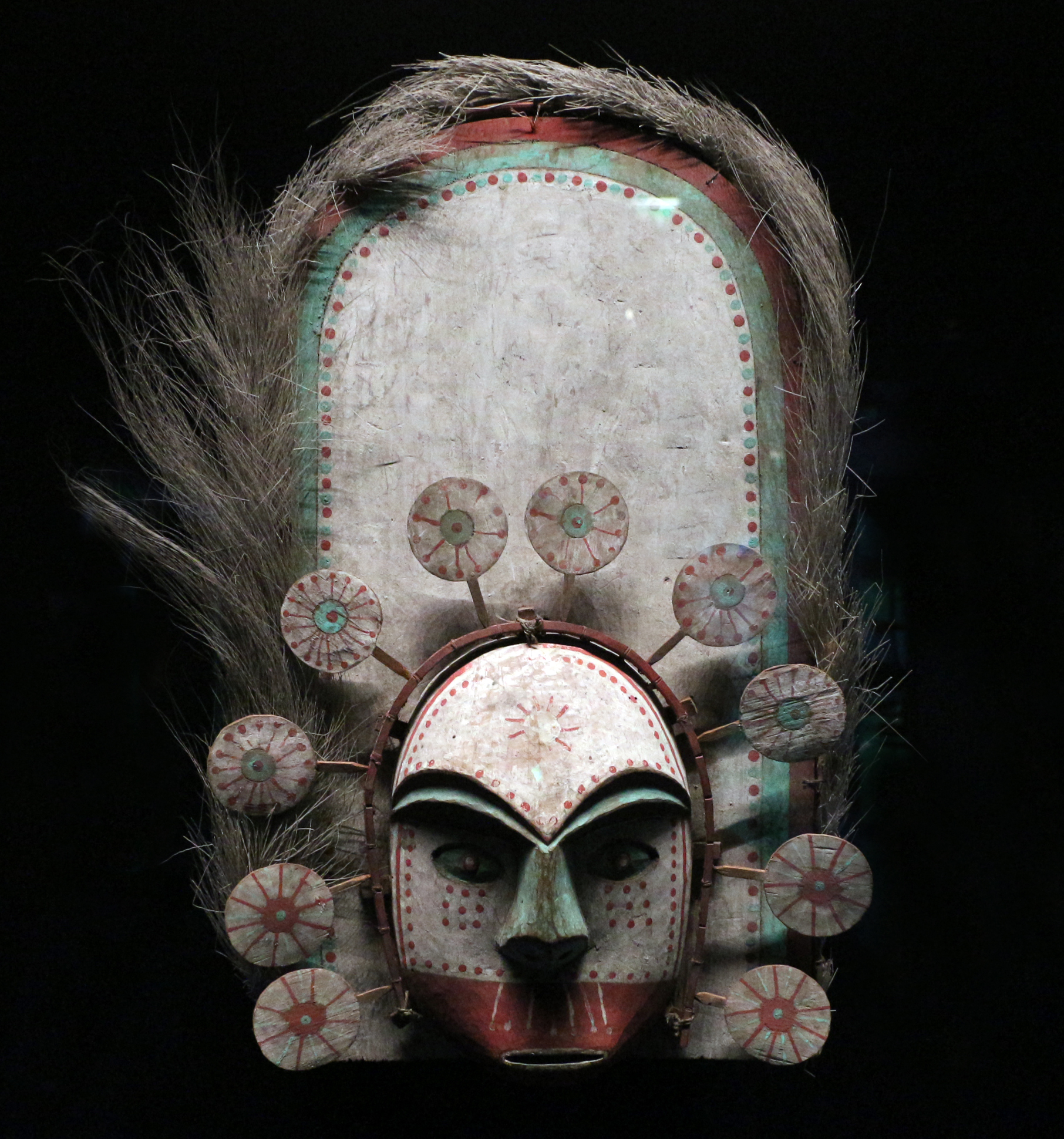
Yup'ik mask; from Alaska; Musée du quai Branly (Paris)

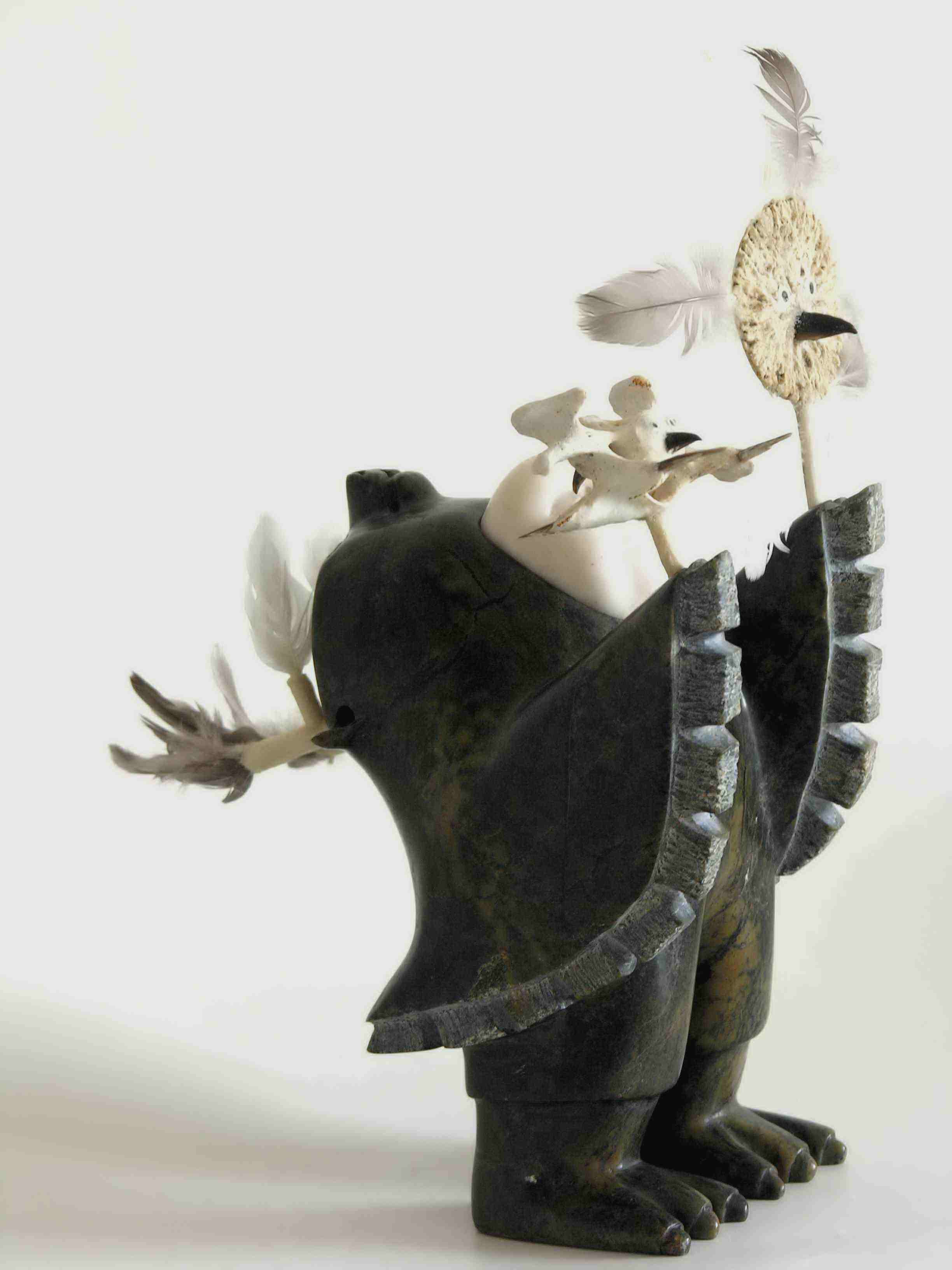
Toy Angakkuq (shaman); 6 February 1998; serpentine, caribou bone & feathers; by Palaya Qiatsuq

==== Subarctic ====
Cultures of interior Alaska and Canada living south of the Arctic Circle are Subarctic peoples. While humans have lived in the region far longer, the oldest known surviving Subarctic art is a petroglyph site in northwest Ontario, dated to 5000 BCE. Caribou, and to a lesser extent moose, are major resources, providing hides, antlers, sinew, and other artistic materials. Porcupine quillwork embellishes hides and birchbark. After European contact with the influence of the Grey Nuns, moosehair tufting and floral glass beadwork became popular through the Subarctic.

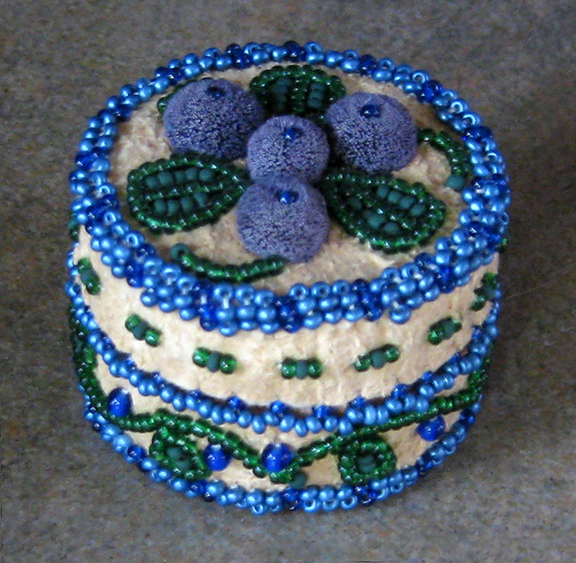
21st-century Athabaskan moosehair tufting on beaded hide box,
Fairbanks, Alaska

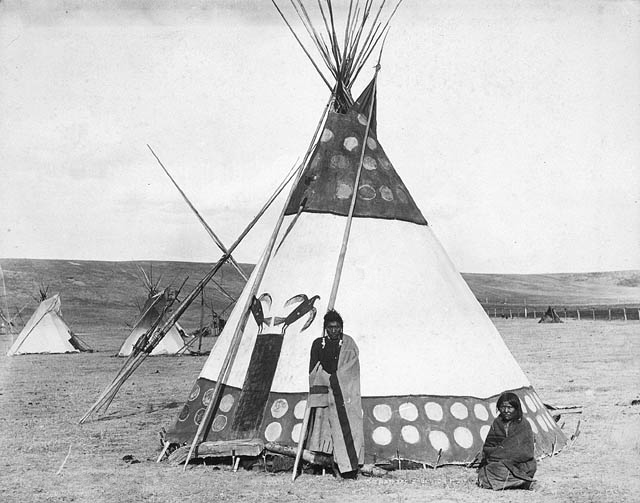
Tsuu T'ina painted hide tipi,
Alberta, Canada

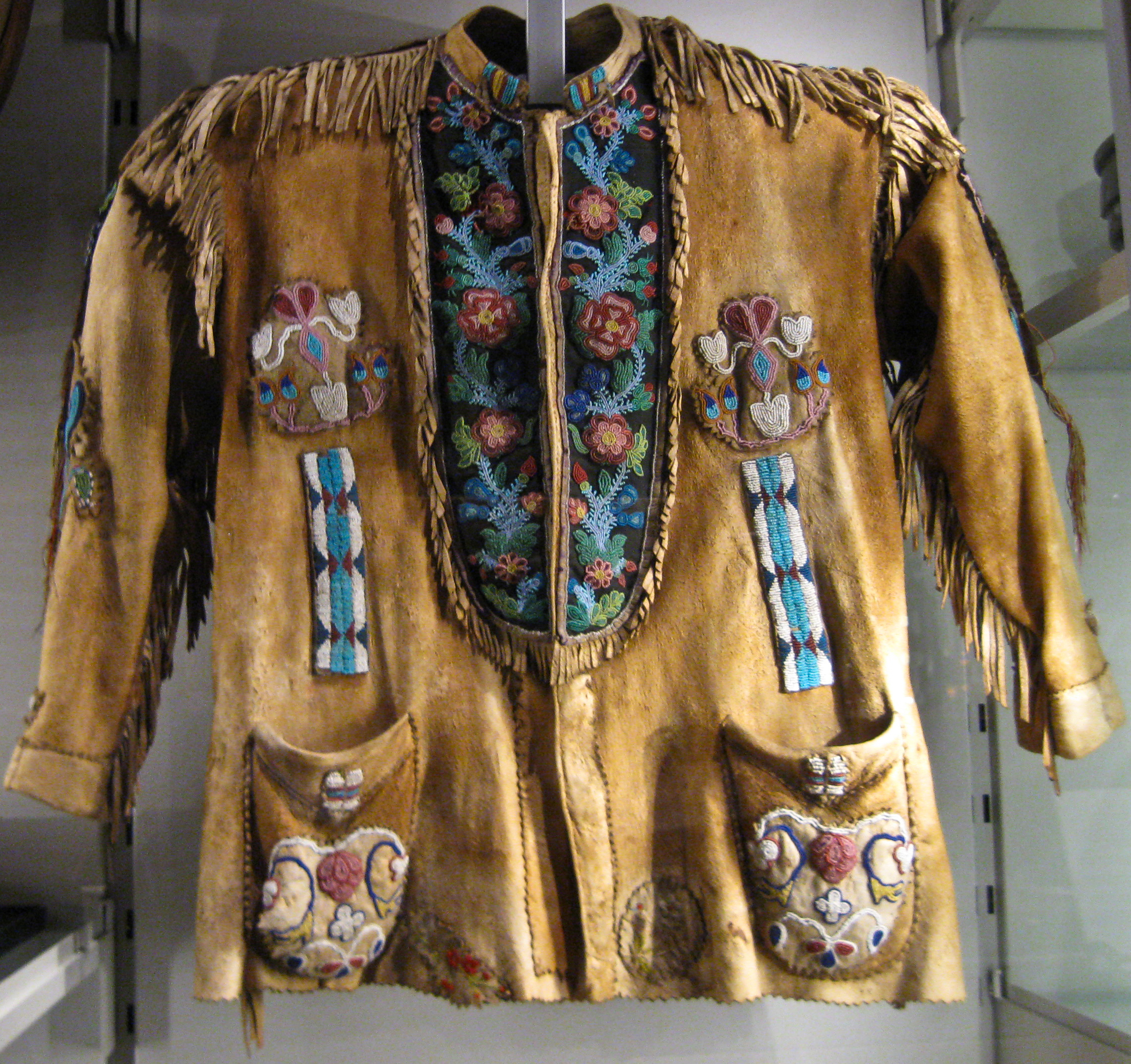
Man's hide jacket. The floral designs' stems feature "thorny" beadwork, typical of the Subarctic, Museum of Anthropology at UBC

=== Northwest Coast ===
The art of the Haida, Tlingit, Heiltsuk, Tsimshian and other smaller tribes living in the coastal areas of Washington state, Oregon, and British Columbia, is characterized by an extremely complex stylistic vocabulary expressed mainly in the medium of woodcarving. Famous examples include totem poles, transformation masks, and canoes. In addition to woodwork, two dimensional painting and silver, gold and copper engraved jewelry became important after contact with Europeans.

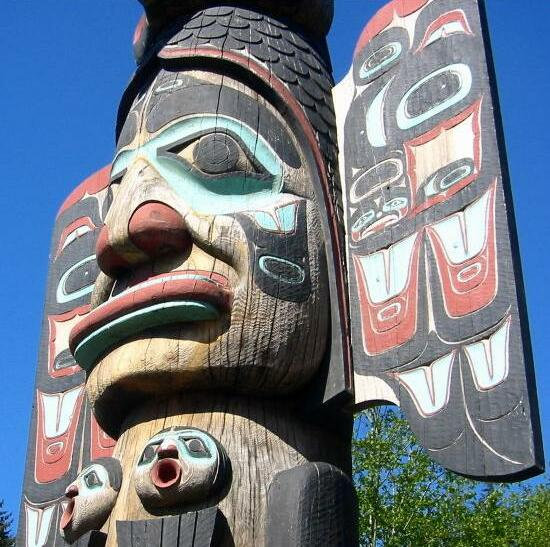
The Chief Johnson totem pole in Ketchikan, Alaska, in the Tlingit style

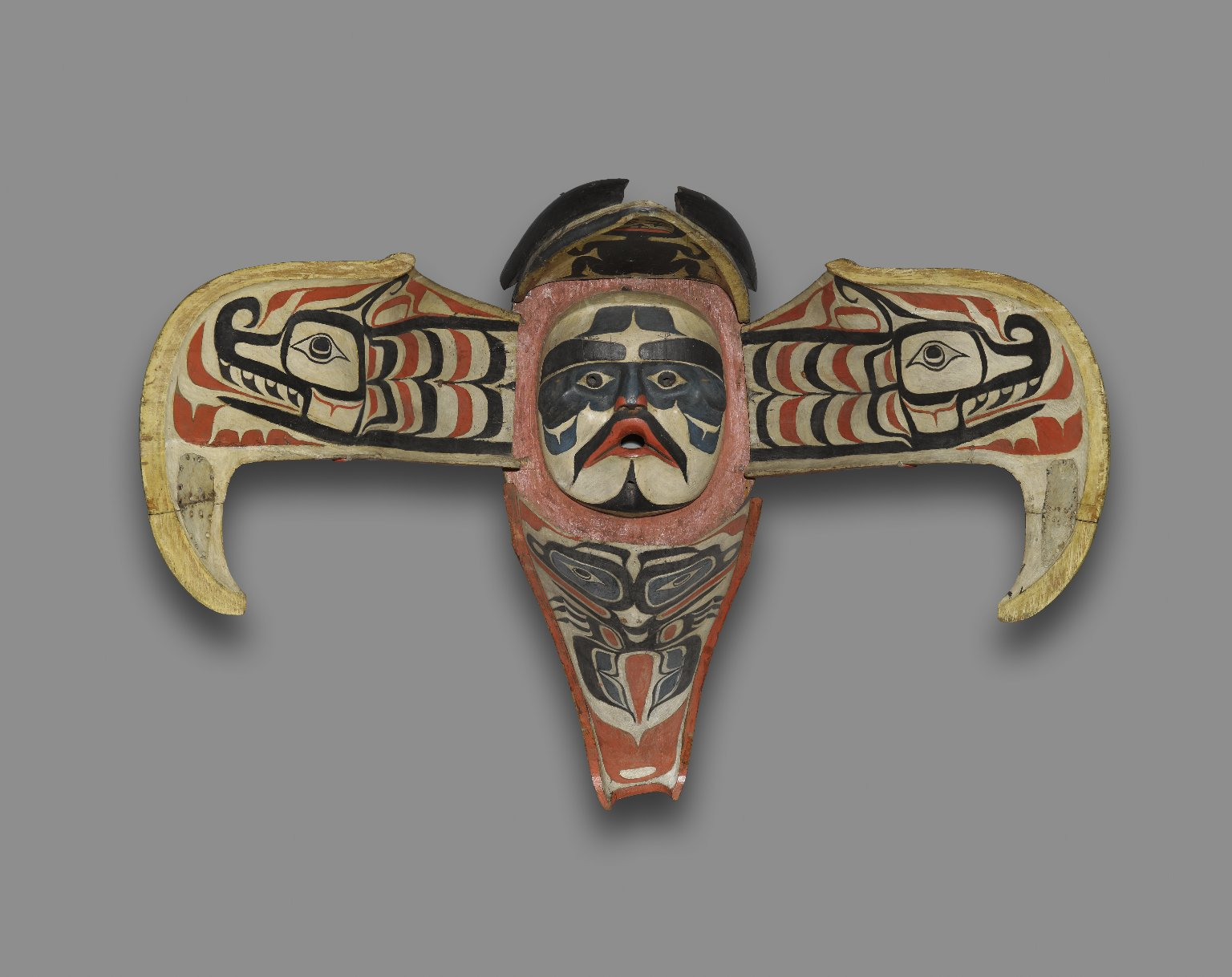
'Namgis thunderbird transformation mask, 19th century, cedar, pigments, leather, nails, metal plate, 71 in. wide when open, Brooklyn Museum, NY

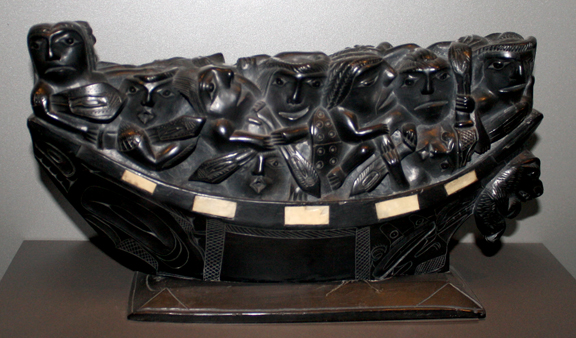
Haida argillite carving; 1850–1900; from Haida Gwaii; National Museum of the American Indian

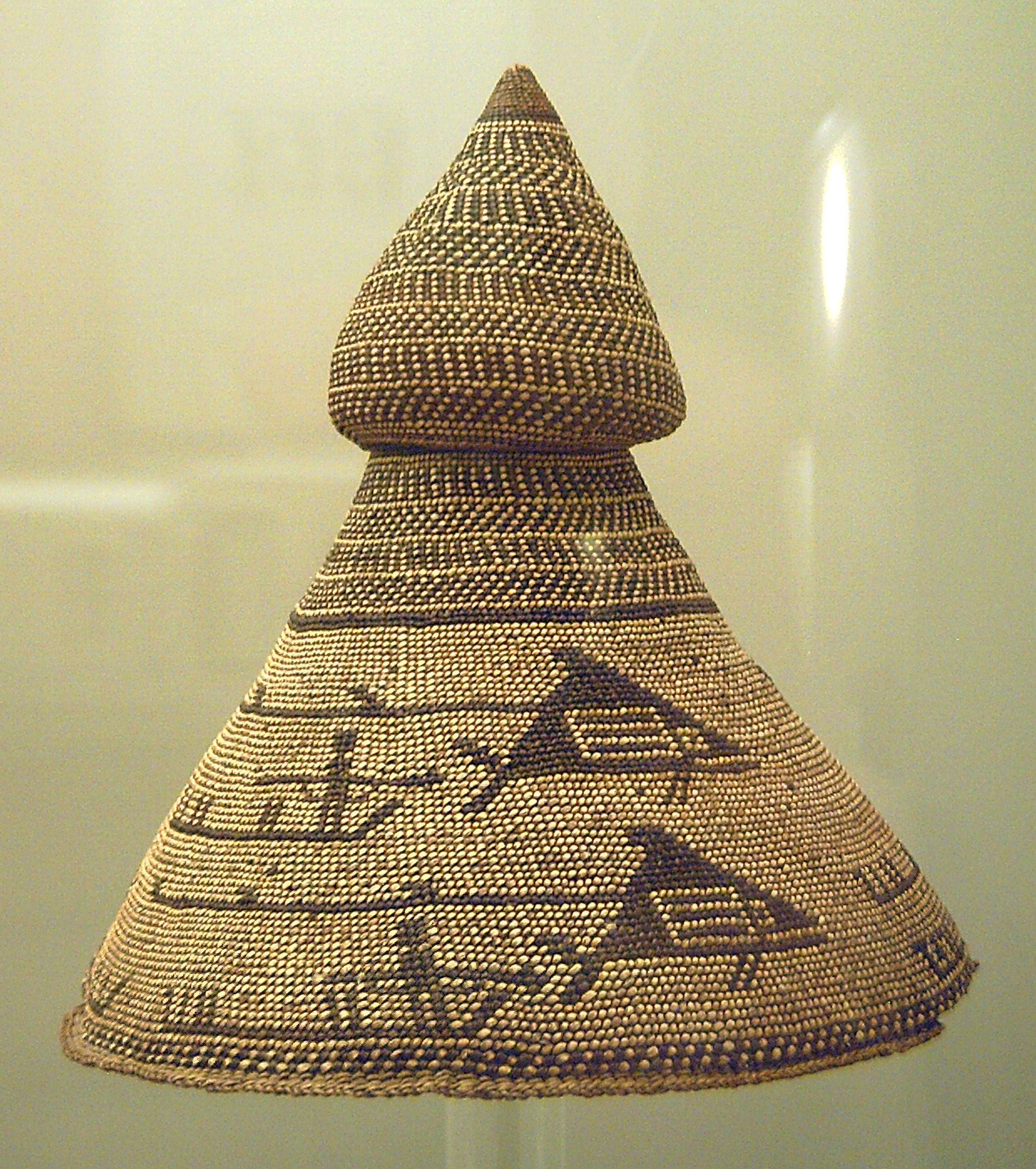
Cedar bark hat; Nuu-chah-nulth; Museum of the Americas (Madrid, Spain)

=== Eastern Woodlands ===
==== Northeastern Woodlands ====
The Eastern Woodlands, or simply woodlands, cultures inhabited the regions of North America east of the Mississippi River at least since 2500 BCE. While there were many regionally distinct cultures, trade between them was common and they shared the practice of burying their dead in earthen mounds, which has preserved a large amount of their art. Because of this trait the cultures are collectively known as the Mound builders.

The Woodland period (1000 BCE–1000 CE) is divided into early, middle, and late periods, and consisted of cultures that relied mostly on hunting and gathering for their subsistence. Ceramics made by the Deptford culture (2500 BCE–100 CE) are the earliest evidence of an artistic tradition in this region. The Adena culture are another well-known example of an early Woodland culture. They carved stone tablets with zoomorphic designs, created pottery, and fashioned costumes from animal hides and antlers for ceremonial rituals. Shellfish was a mainstay of their diet, and engraved shells have been found in their burial mounds.

The Middle Woodland period was dominated by cultures of the Hopewell tradition (200–500). Their artwork encompassed a wide variety of jewelry and sculpture in stone, wood, and even human bone.

The Late Woodland period (500–1000 CE) saw a decline in trade and in the size of settlements, and the creation of art likewise declined.

From the 12th century onward, the Haudenosaunee and nearby coastal tribes fashioned wampum from shells and string; these were mnemonic devices, currency, and records of treaties.

Iroquois people carve False Face masks for healing rituals, but the traditional representatives of the tribes, the Grand Council of the Haudenosaunee, are clear that these masks are not for sale or public display. The same can be said for Iroquois Corn Husk Society masks.

Art from the Eastern woodlands of North America

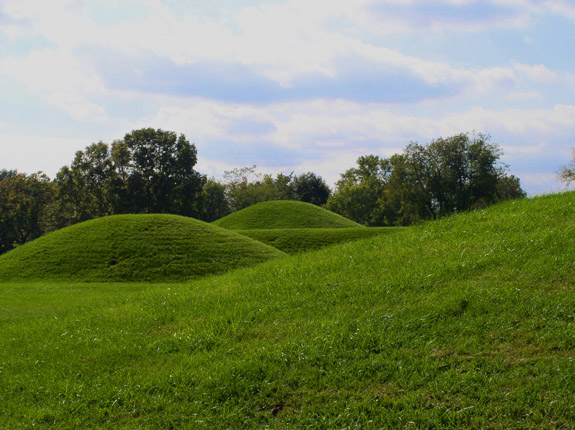
Hopewell mounds from the Mound City Group in Ohio

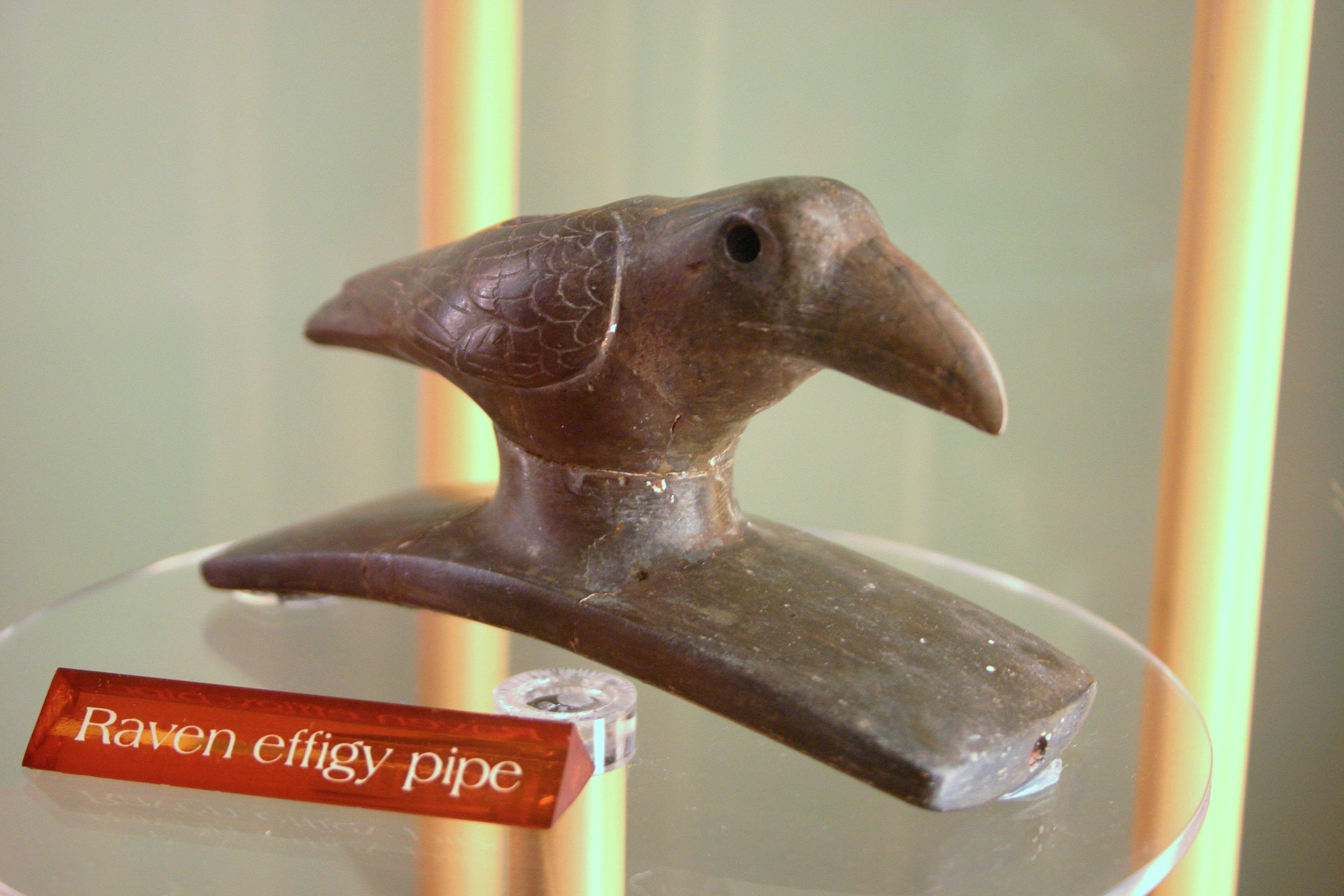
Carved soapstone pipe depicting a raven, Hopewell tradition

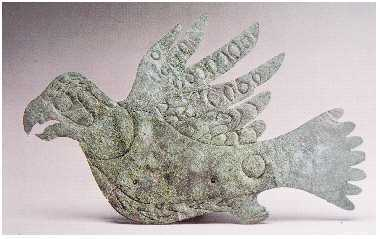
Copper falcon from the Mound City Group site of the Hopewell culture

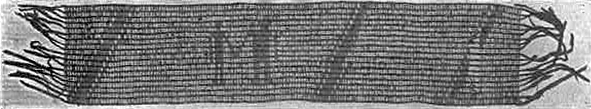
Great Treaty wampum belt given from the Lenape to William Penn, Pennsylvania, 1682

One fine art sculptor of the mid-nineteenth century was Edmonia Lewis (African American / Ojibwe). Two of her works are held by the Newark Museum.

Native peoples of the Northeastern Woodlands continued to make visual art through the 20th and 21st centuries. One such artist is Sharol Graves, whose serigraphs have been exhibited in the National Museum of the American Indian. Graves is also the illustrator of The People Shall Continue from Lee & Low Books.

==== Southeastern Woodlands ====
The Poverty Point culture inhabited portions of the state of Louisiana from 2000 to 1000 BCE during the Archaic period. Many objects excavated at Poverty Point sites were made of materials that originated in distant places, including chipped stone projectile points and tools, ground stone plummets, gorgets and vessels, and shell and stone beads. Stone tools found at Poverty Point were made from raw materials which originated in the relatively nearby Ouachita and Ozark Mountains and from the much further away Ohio and Tennessee River valleys. Vessels were made from soapstone which came from the Appalachian foothills of Alabama and Georgia. Hand-modeled lowly fired clay objects occur in a variety of shapes including anthropomorphic figurines and cooking balls.

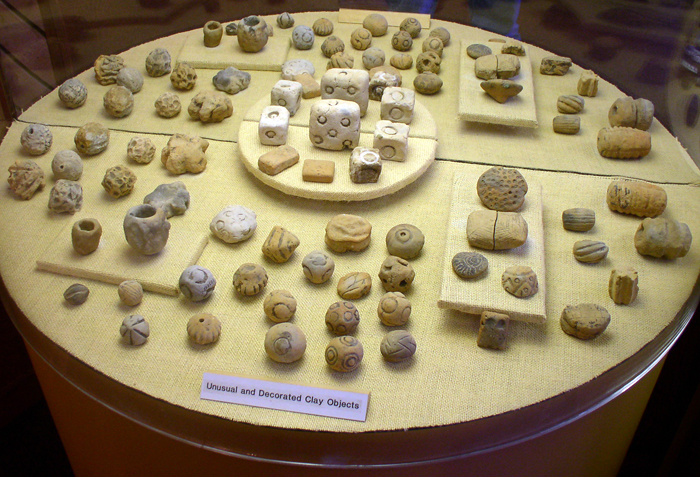
Clay cooking utensils, Poverty Point

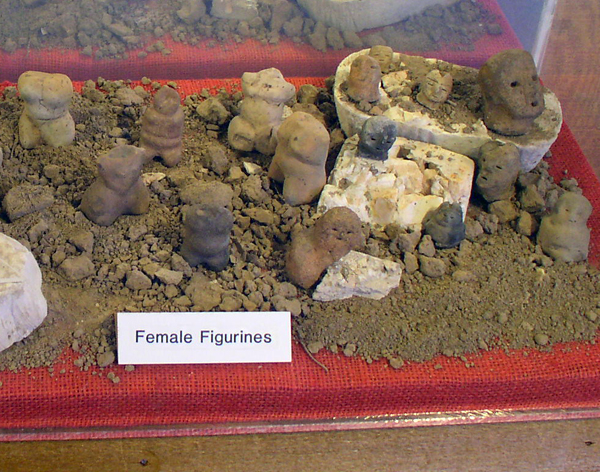
Clay female figurines, Poverty Point

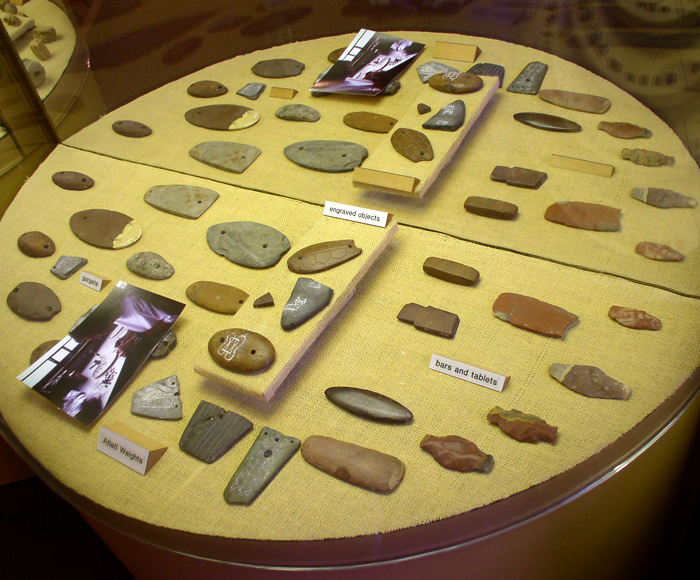
Carved gorgets and atlatl weights, Poverty Point

The Mississippian culture flourished in what is now the Midwestern, Eastern, and Southeastern United States from approximately 800 CE to 1500 CE, varying regionally. After adopting maize agriculture the Mississippian culture became fully agrarian, as opposed to the hunting and gathering supplemented by part-time agriculture practiced by preceding woodland cultures. They built platform mounds larger and more complex than those of their predecessors, and finished and developed more advanced ceramic techniques, commonly using ground mussel shell as a tempering agent. Many were involved with the Southeastern Ceremonial Complex, a pan-regional and pan-linguistic religious and trade network. The majority of the information known about the S.E.C.C. is derived from examination of the elaborate artworks left behind by its participants, including pottery, shell gorgets and cups, stone statuary, repoussé copper plates such as the Wulfing cache, Rogan plates, and Long-nosed god maskettes. By the time of European contact the Mississippian societies were already experiencing severe social stress, and with the political upheavals and diseases introduced by Europeans many of the societies collapsed and ceased to practice a Mississippian lifestyle, with notable exceptions being the Plaquemine culture Natchez and related Taensa peoples. Other tribes descended from Mississippian cultures include the Caddo, Choctaw, Muscogee Creek, Wichita, and many other southeastern peoples.

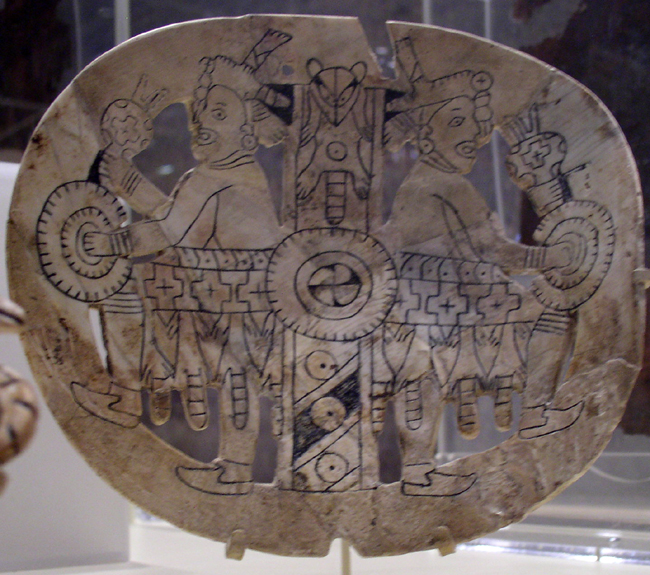
Engraved shell gorget, Spiro Mounds (Mississippian culture)

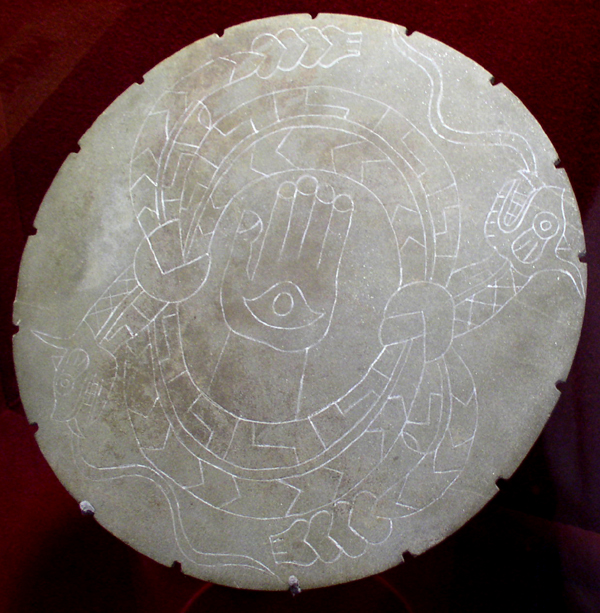
Engraved stone palette, Moundville Site, back used for mixing paint (Mississippian culture)

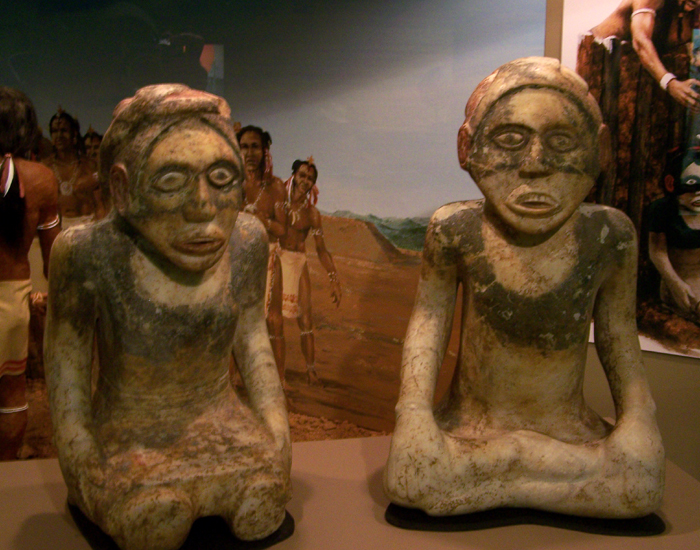
Stone effigies, Etowah Site (Mississippian culture)

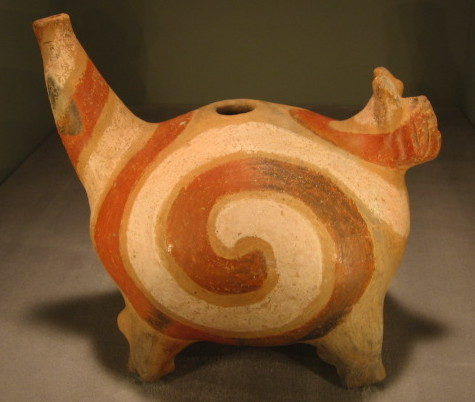
Ceramic underwater panther jug, Rose Mound (Mississippian culture)

A large number of pre-Columbian wooden artifacts have been found in Florida. While the oldest wooden artifacts are as much as 10,000 years old, carved and painted wooden objects are known only from the past 2,000 years. Animal effigies and face masks have been found at a number of sites in Florida. Animal effigies dating to between 200 and 600 were found in a mortuary pond at Fort Center, on the west side of Lake Okeechobee. Particularly impressive is a 66 cm tall carving of an eagle.

More than 1,000 carved and painted wooden objects, including masks, tablets, plaques and effigies, were excavated in 1896 at Key Marco, in southwestern Florida. They have been described as some of the finest prehistoric Native American art in North America. The objects are not well dated, but may belong to the first millennium of the current era. Spanish missionaries described similar masks and effigies in use by the Calusa late in the 17th century, and at the former Tequesta site on the Miami River in 1743, although no examples of the Calusa objects from the historic period have survived. A south Florida effigy style is known from wooden and bone carvings from various sites in the Belle Glade, Caloosahatchee, and Glades culture areas. The Miami Circle, a Tequesta site depicting a near-perfect circle was excavated in 1998.

The Seminoles are best known for their textile creations, especially patchwork clothing. Doll-making is another notable craft.

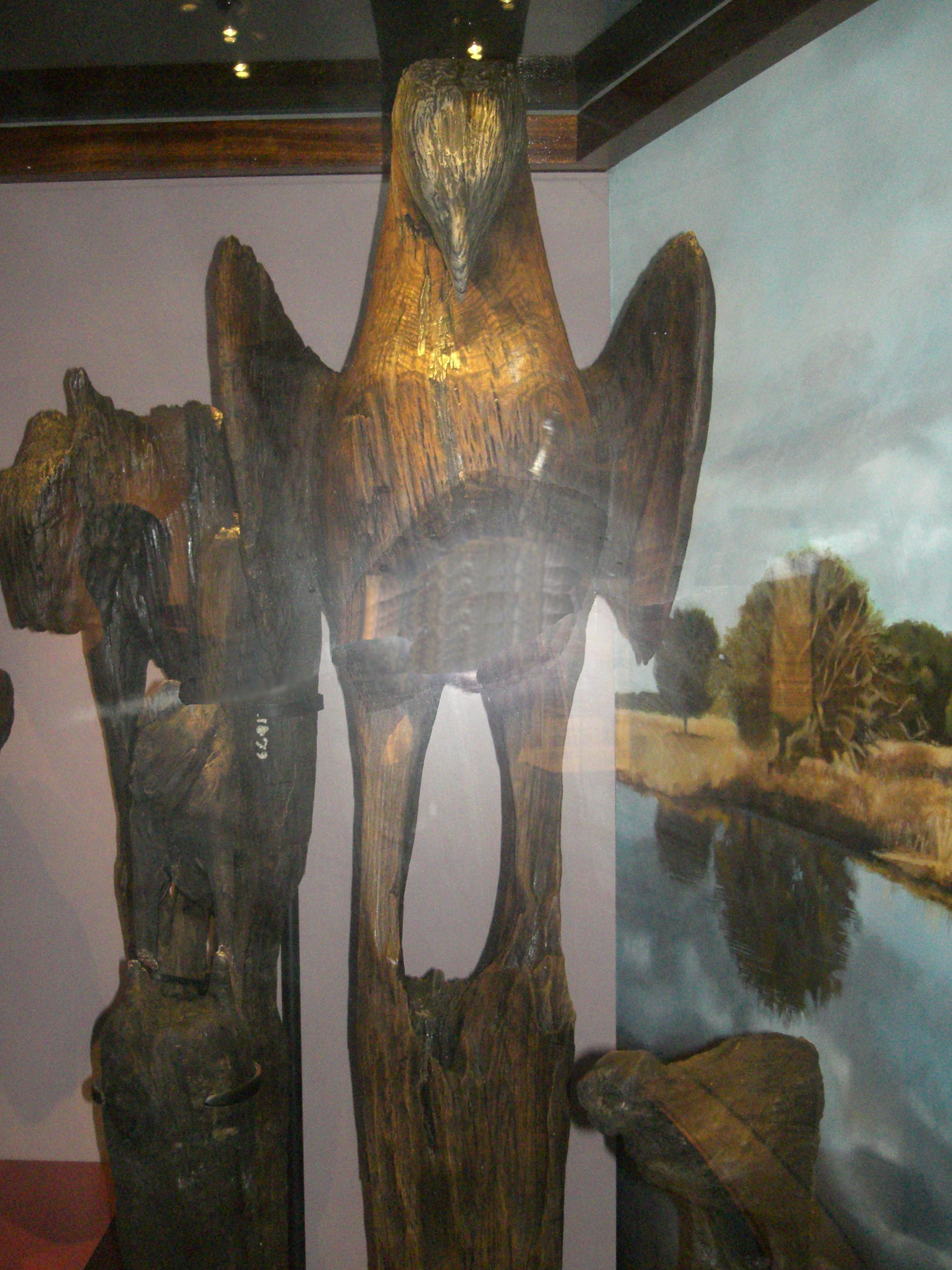
Eagle totem, Fort Center, Florida

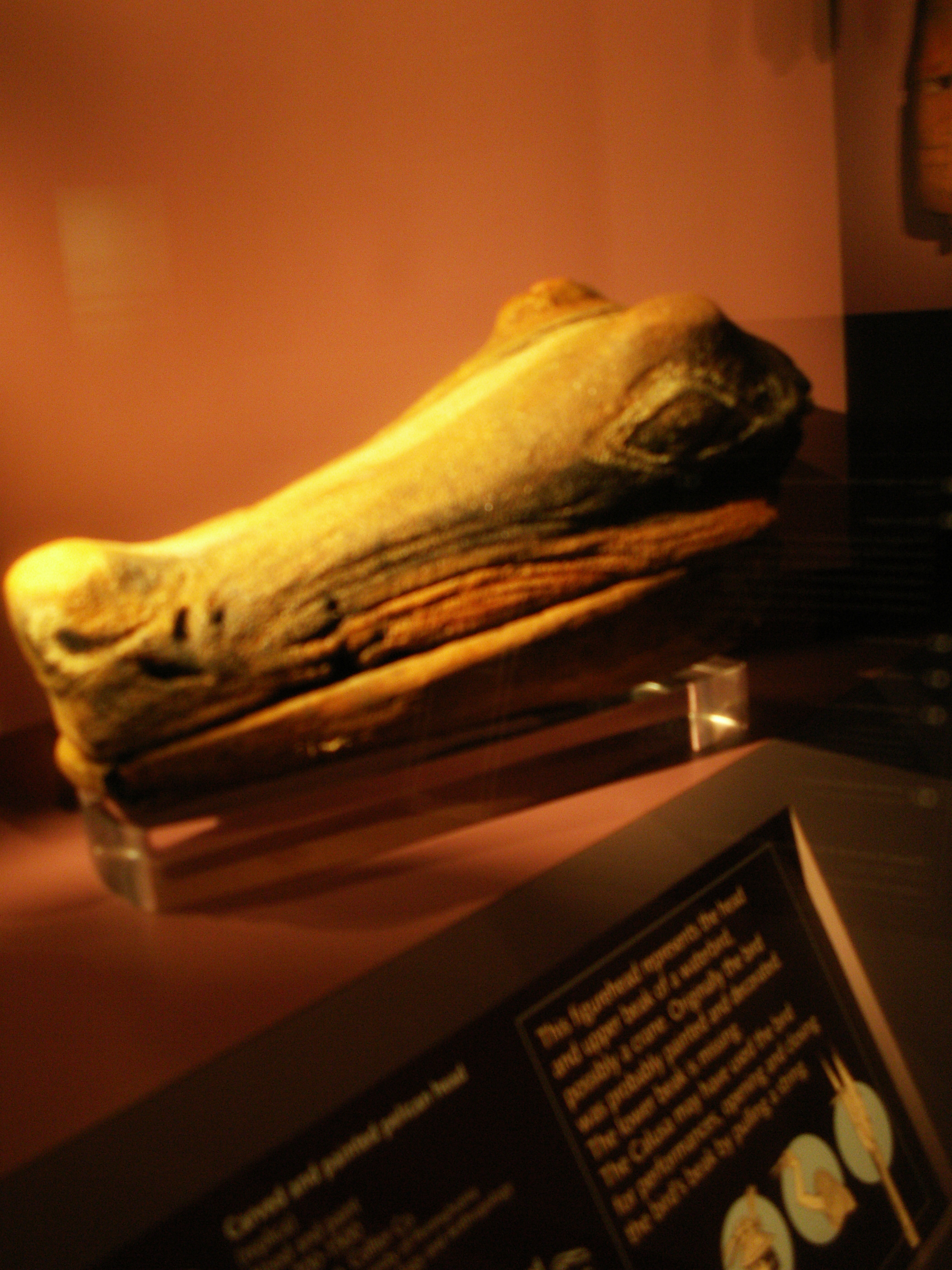
Alligator effigy, wood carving, Key Marco, Florida

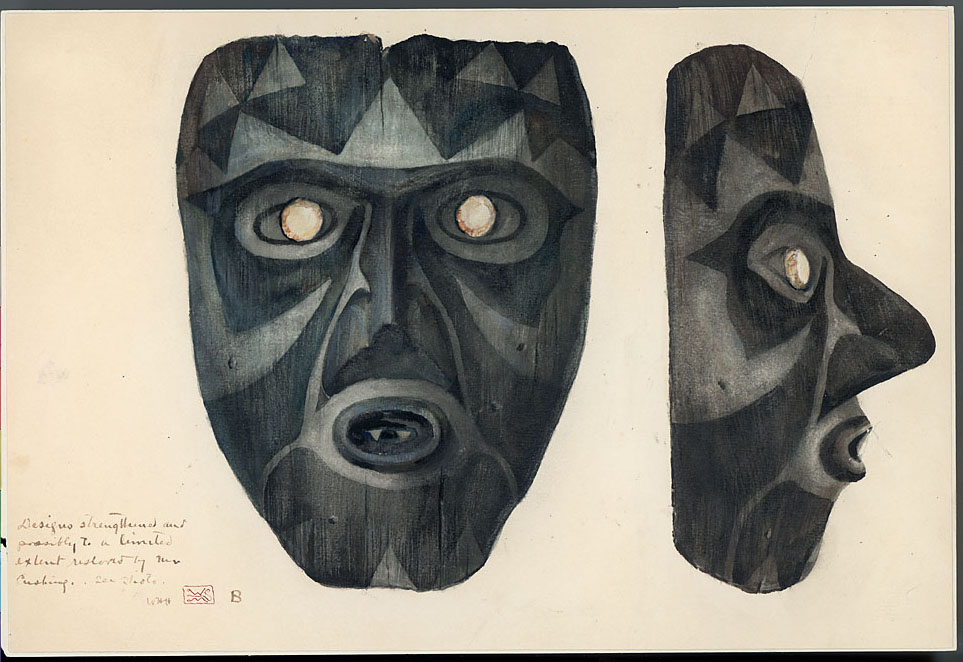
Wooden mask, Key Marco, Florida

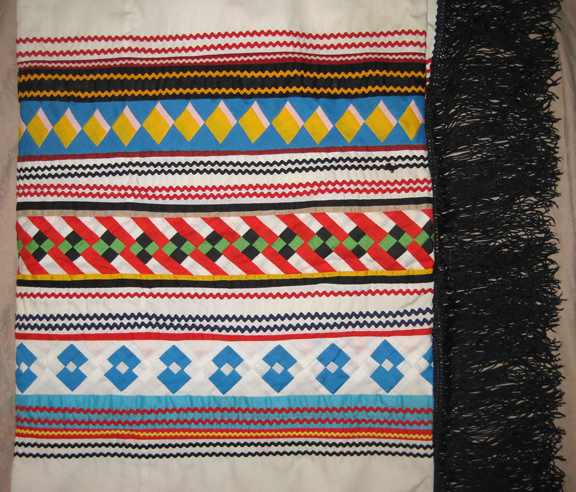
Seminole patchwork fringed dance shawl, Big Cypress Indian Reservation, Florida, 1980s

=== The West ===
==== Great Plains ====
Tribes have lived on the Great Plains for thousands of years. Early Plains cultures are commonly divided into four periods: Paleoindian (at least c. 10,000–4000 BCE), Plains Archaic (c. 4000–250 BCE), Plains Woodland (c. 250 BCE–950 CE), Plains Village (c. 950–1850 CE). The oldest known painted object in North American was found in the southern plains, the Cooper Bison Skull, found in Oklahoma and dated 10,900–10,200 BCE. It's painted with a red zig-zag.

In the Plains Village period, the cultures of the area settled in enclosed clusters of rectangular houses and cultivated maize. Various regional differences emerged, including Southern Plains, Central Plains, Oneota, and Middle Missouri. Tribes were both nomadic hunters and semi-nomadic farmers. During the Plains Coalescent period (1400-European contact) some change, possibly drought, caused the mass migration of the population to the Eastern Woodlands region, and the Great Plains were sparsely populated until pressure from American settlers drove tribes into the area again.

The advent of the horse revolutionized the cultures of many historical Plains tribes. Horse culture enabled tribes to live a completely nomadic existence, hunting buffalo. Buffalo hide clothing was decorated with porcupine quill embroidery and beads – dentalium shells and elk teeth were prized materials. Later coins and glass beads acquired from trading were incorporated into Plains art. Plains beadwork has flourished into contemporary times.

Buffalo was the preferred material for Plains hide painting. Men painted narrative, pictorial designs recording personal exploits or visions. They also painted pictographic historical calendars known as Winter counts. Women painted geometric designs on tanned robes and rawhide parfleches, which sometimes served as maps.

During the Reservation Era of the late 19th century, buffalo herds were systematically destroyed by non-native hunters. Due to the scarcity of hides, Plains artists adopted new painting surfaces, such as muslin or paper, giving birth to Ledger art, so named for the ubiquitous ledger books used by Plains artists.

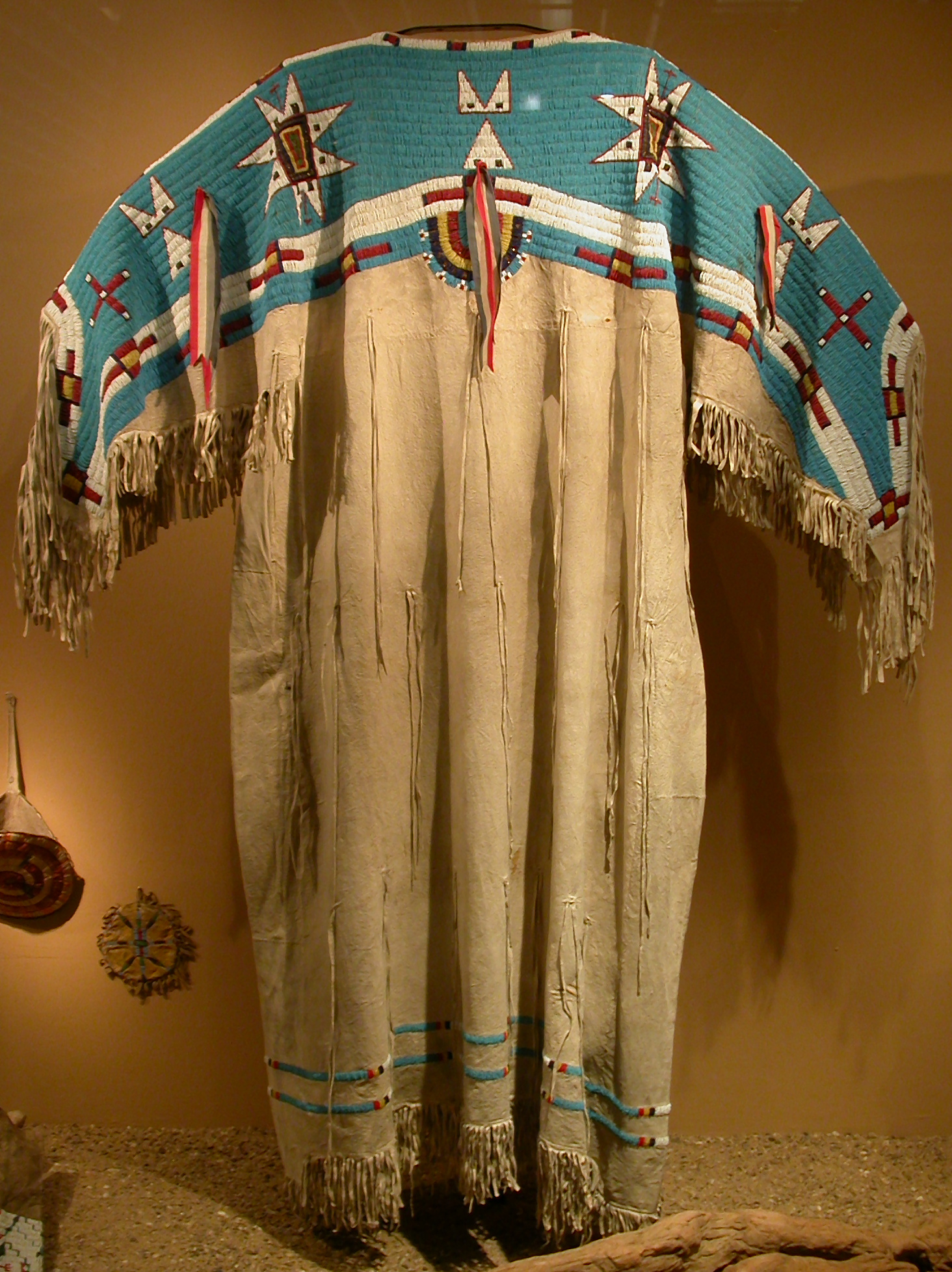
Sioux dress with fully beaded yoke.

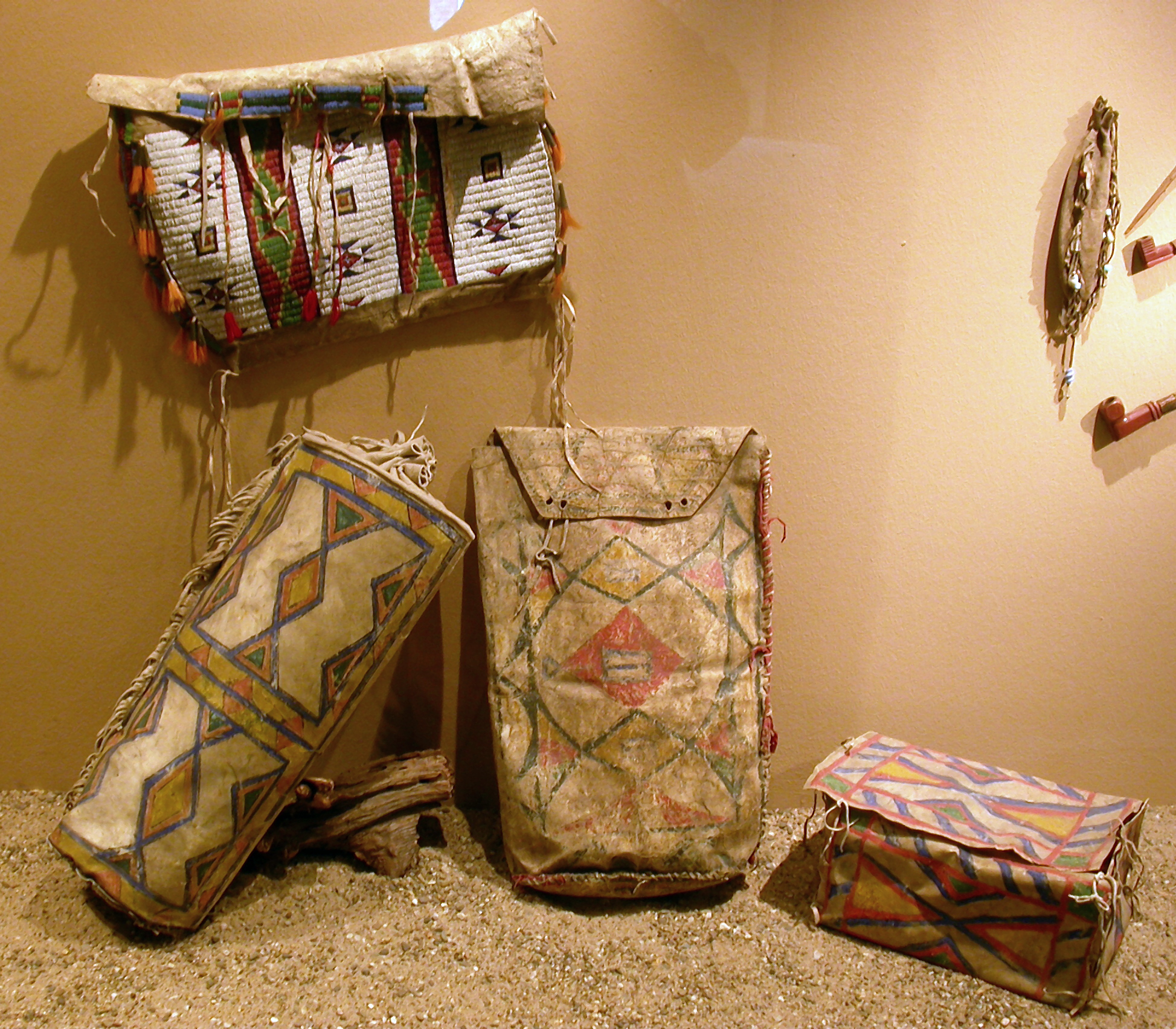
Sioux beaded and painted rawhide parfleches.

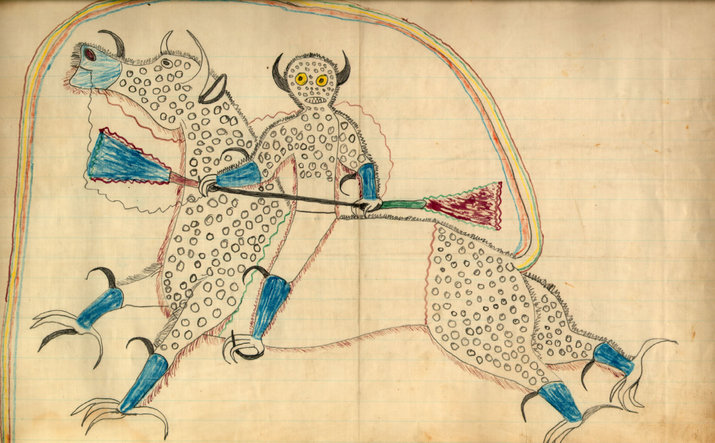
Ledger drawing of Haokah (c. 1880) by Black Hawk (Lakota).

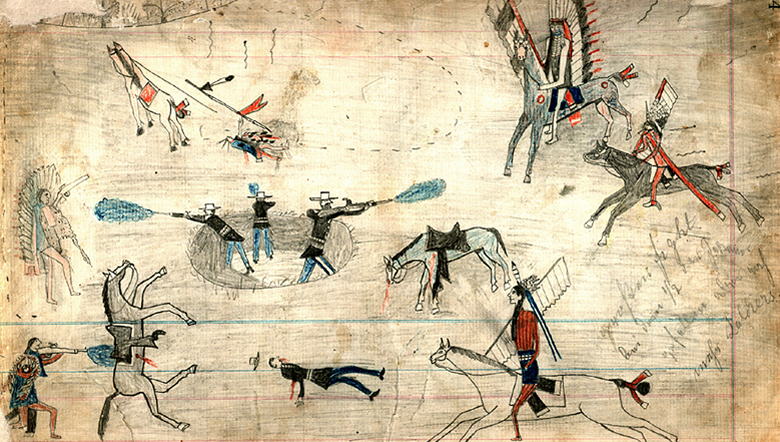
Kiowa ledger art, possibly of the 1874 Buffalo Wallow battle, Red River War.

==== Great Basin and Plateau ====
Since the archaic period the Plateau region, also known as the Intermontaine and upper Great Basin, had been a center of trade. Plateau people traditionally settled near major river systems. Because of this, their art carries influences from other regions – from the Pacific Northwest coasts and Great Plains. Nez Perce, Yakama, Umatilla, and Cayuse women weave flat, rectangular corn husks or hemp dogbane bags, which are decorated with "bold, geometric designs" in false embroidery. Plateau beadworkers are known for their contour-style beading and their elaborate horse regalia.

Great Basin tribes have a sophisticated basket making tradition, as exemplified by Dat So La Lee/Louisa Keyser (Washoe), Lucy Telles, Carrie Bethel and Nellie Charlie. After being displaced from their lands by non-Native settlers, Washoe wove baskets for the commodity market, especially 1895 to 1935. Paiute, Shoshone and Washoe basketmakers are known for their baskets that incorporate seed beads on the surface and for waterproof baskets.

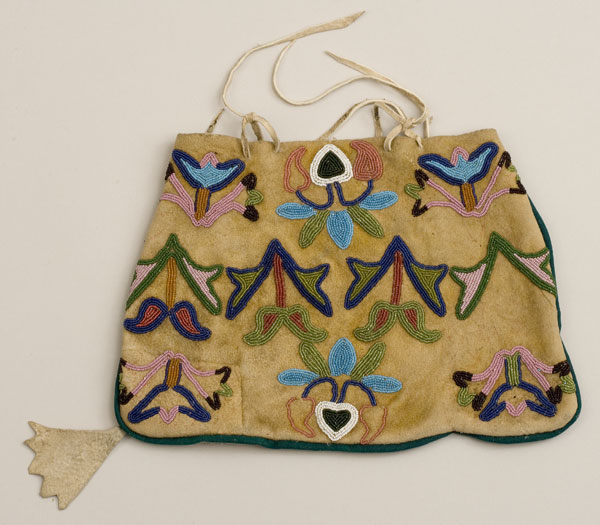
Nez Perce bag with contour beadwork, c. 1850-60

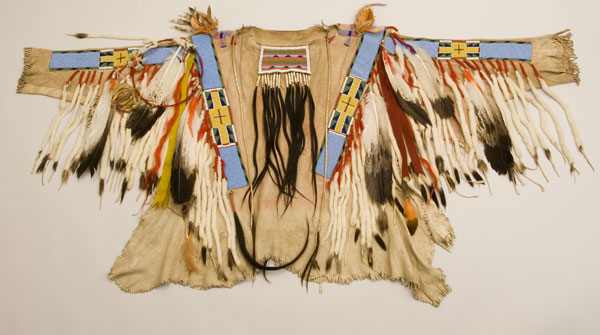
Nez Perce man's beaded and quilled buckskin shirt with eagle feathers and ermine pelts, c. 1880-85

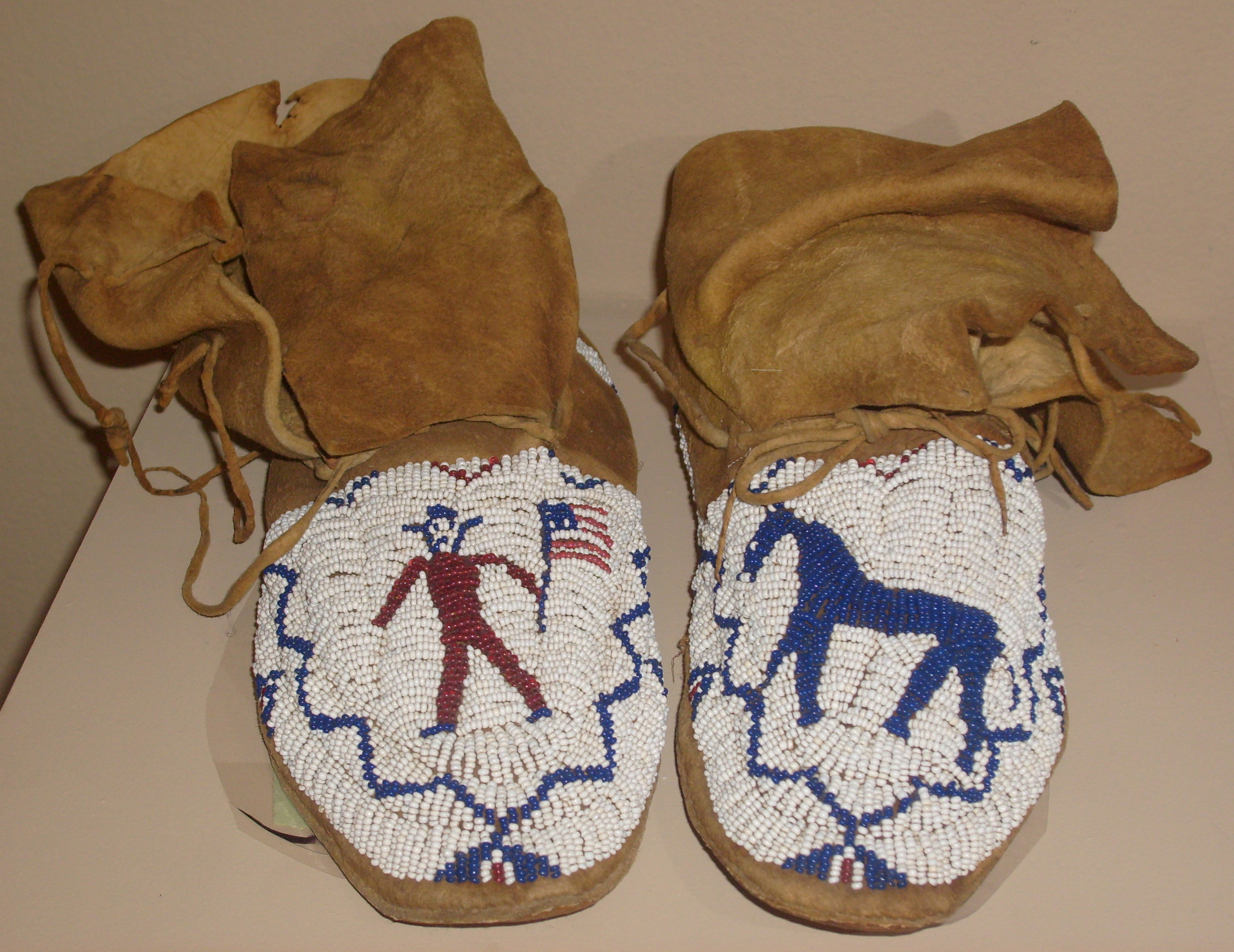
Shoshone beaded men's moccasins, circa 1900, Wyoming

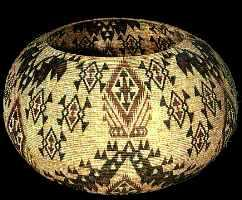
Basket by Carrie Bethel (Mono Lake Paiute), California, 30" diam., c. 1931-35

==== California ====
The Native Americans of California have used different mediums and forms for their traditional designs found in artifacts that express their history and culture. Some traditional art forms and archaeological evidence include basketry, painted pictographs and petroglyphs found on the walls in caves, effigy figurines, and shell beads.

The Native Americans in California have a tradition of exquisitely detailed basket weaving arts. In the late 19th-century Californian baskets by artists in the Cahuilla, Chumash, Pomo, Miwok, Hupa, Serrano, Cupeño, and many other tribes became popular with collectors, museums, and tourists. This resulted in great innovation in the form of the baskets. Many pieces by Native American basket weavers from all parts of California are in museum collections, such as the Peabody Museum of Archaeology and Ethnology at Harvard University, the Southwest Museum, and the Smithsonian Institution National Museum of the American Indian. Baskets are typically woven from a combination of dried grasses and other plants, such as those of the Juncaceae and Sumac families, and often feature patterns created with dyed strands of grass, usually in black, red, or orange. Baskets of a single color are relatively uncommon amongst most tribes. Certain design motifs, such as stars, crosses, and flowers, can be found in the basketry of multiple tribes whose territories neighbor each other, and although this was once attributed to cultural exchange occurring within the Spanish Missions in California, baskets dating to before the beginning of the mission project suggest that this was actually the result of the exchange of goods and ideas that occur between neighboring cultures.

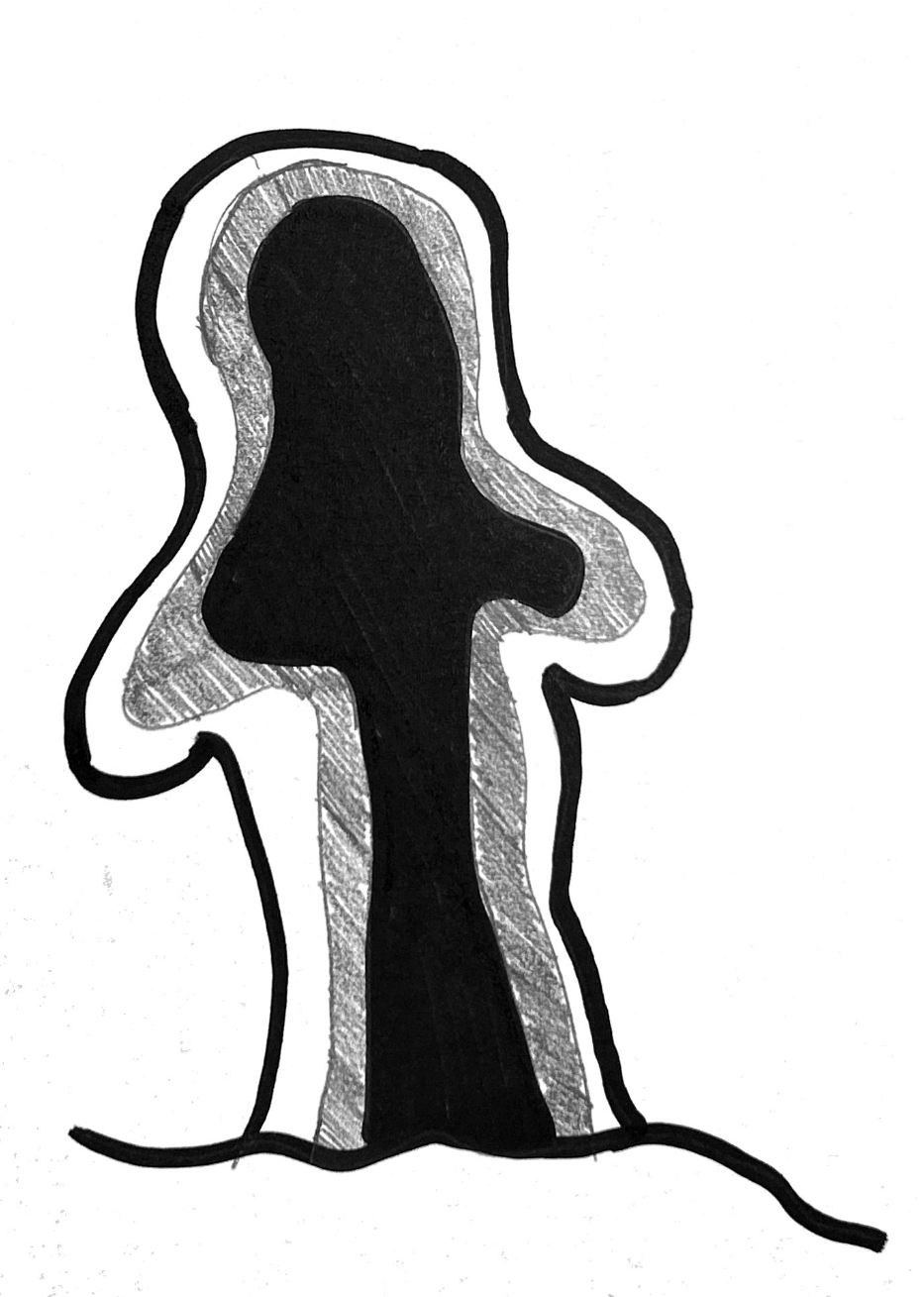
Self-drawing/ Interpretation of teddy bear elements (Sketch by Mark Sutton)

California has a large number of pictographs and petroglyphs rock art. One of the largest densities of petroglyphs in North America, by the Coso people, is in Big and Little Petroglyph Canyons in the Coso Rock Art District of the northern Mojave Desert in California. In the Sand Canyon Area, located in the Southern Sierra Nevada, California, rock art of the Kawaiisu is found in the site of Teddy Bear Cave. Among the findings, the zoomorphic and anthropomorphic drawing elements within the cave have been tied to the site’s purpose as a ceremonial space where other material artifacts were given as sacred offerings. Kawaiisu mythology is directly represented in the rock art, displaying significance closely related to myths of creation. Pictograph notes as well as other ethnographic data such as oral interviews with members of the tribe, Teddy Bear Caves' significance in Kawaiisu mythology can be further explained, along with its drawing elements which are not relatively known in California Archaeology.

The most elaborate pictographs in the U.S are considered to be the rock art of the Chumash people, found in cave paintings in present-day Santa Barbara, Ventura, and San Luis Obispo Counties. The Chumash cave painting includes examples at Chumash Painted Cave State Historic Park and Burro Flats Painted Cave.

Another form of stone carving, practiced by the Hokan Chumash and Comcaac peoples, is the art of carving stones to resemble slices of columnar cactus, referred to by as cactus stones, or cogged stones by indigenous Californian mythology expert, Paul Apodaca. These cactus stones were carved into the shape of a variety of cuts and species of cacti, commonly slices of the San Pedro cactus and saguaro cactus. Cactus stones resembling thin slices of the middle of the cactus could be used as tokens for a game called camoiilcoj, or as wheels for a children's toy, those resembling the rounded tops of the San Pedro and saguaro cactus were used as spinning tops, and those resembling thicker slices, often with a depression carved into the center of the stone were used as containers for materials used in rituals, as well as being sacrificed for religious rituals in place of actual cactus slices when the plants needed were unavailable. The art of carving cactus stones originated with the Comcaac people, who had access to an abundance of cactus, and for whom cacti hold spiritual significance, are thought to have shared the art form with the neighboring Chumash tribes. This is thought to be the case because of cactus stones being found at Chumash sites with rock art bearing strong resemblance to Comcaac depictions of cactus. Since the Chumash sites are in regions where the species of cacti depicted by the rock art and cactus stones are not plentiful, the presence of such motifs is likely a result of the exchange of knowledge that accompanies the exchange of trade goods.

An art practice used by the Native American tribes of California, such as the Chumash, are carving and shaping effigy figurines. From multiple archaeological studies that occurred in various historical sites (the Channel Islands, Malibu, Santa Barbara, and more) many effigy figures were discovered and portrayed several zoomorphic forms, such as fish, whales, frogs, and birds. As a result from analyzing these effigy figurines in these studies, several strong conclusions were drawn that provided context to the Native Americans of California, such as social attributes between the Chumash and other tribes, economical significance, and possibly used in rituals. Some effigy figurines were found in burials, and others were found in relation to having similar stylistic features with dates that suggest social interactional spheres in the Middle and Late Holocene between tribes. There is limited evidence of sea otter and Pinniped imagery in the coastal region of California spiritual practices, however there have been finds such as the ones in a Palmer-Redondo site in 1932 that indicate a connection between such imagery and ritual and belief. Effigies shaped to resemble sea otters were found in the Redondo Beach site in Los Angeles County and are believed to have played any number of roles in the cultural practices. The items found at the site were two full body sea otter steatite carvings. These items could have been decorative or aesthetic pieces however they are believed to have been talismans or amulets, possessing spiritual essence or magic properties associated with good hunting or abundance in a species.

An association of affluence from owning otter skin/pelts compared to the meat of the animal is also noted. In particular how the stone otter effigies contributed to the social organization of communities. This is suggested based on the interpretation that the pelt of the animal is the most desired part of the otter, thus the importance of having a full body effigy to indicate the importance of the otter’s fur. The presence of full body effigies in graves supports this idea of affluence in connection to the otter pelts. Social distinctions would likely be reflected in the differences in allocation of stone effigies in each grave, associating more stone effigies with higher social status.

Similar stone effigies have been found in the California coastal area, in the Palos Verdes Peninsula a stone object was found believed to be part of the Gabrielino/Tongva people. The object resembles the shape of a bird or potentially a porpoise-like creature. This is due to the distinctive hump and head that could be interpreted as a bird in flight or a porpoise showing its tail. The siltstone artifact may have started its cultural life as a manuport of some kind because of the similarities in shape to a bird or whale, but ultimately shows evidence of being shaped into its current form. Human manipulation of the rock is also evident from the perfectly placed midline on the effigy that is meant to indicate the object's center of gravity. When strung from this midline the effigy maintains a level horizontal position, potentially meant to mimic a bird in flight.

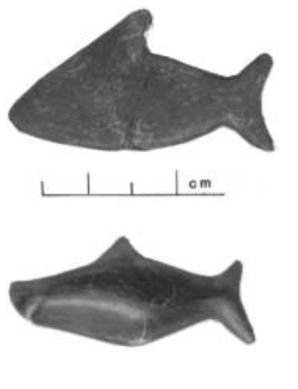
Sandstone shark effigies found in San Nicholas Island.

Shell and other glass beads have been widely used and traded along the California Coast from tribes such as the Kumeyaay, the Cahuilla, and the Luiseño for over 10,000 years. Throughout the Southwest, California, and the Great Basin, disc beads such as Olivella biplicata, Haliotis rufescens epidermis, and Mytilus californianus have been found through excavation, with collections deriving from California State Parks and the Collections Management Program at San Diego State University. Over the years, archaeologists and historians have studied how these shell beads are crafted for various uses, including religious and traditional ceremonies. Shells, such as freshwater snails and other marine life, were utilized for ornamental purposes as much as they were crafted for jewelry. Jewelry for Kumeyaay women was found to include “blue beads”, otherwise known as clam shell beads, while men wore nasal septums and small beaded strings of white clam shells. Shell bead jewelry that is traded is often later used and distributed in ceremonies amongst tribes such as the Cahuilla, the Serrano, and the Gabrieleño (Tongva).Shell beads not only pertained to decor purposes within the state of California but were also significant in trade and networking through other territories. Ornamental shell beads were traded across the Mexican border integrating themselves into other tribes in Baja California.

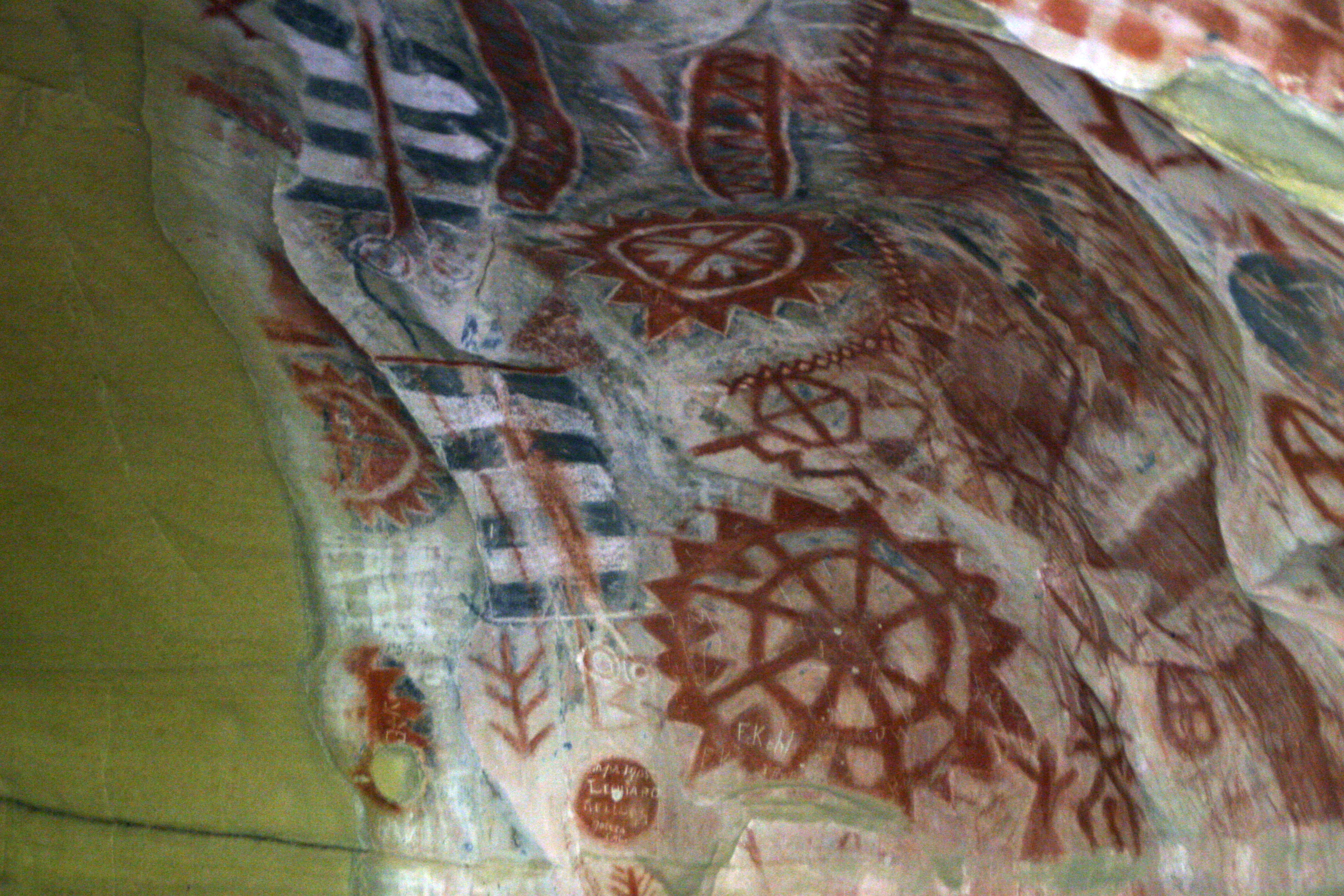
Chumash rock art at Painted Cave

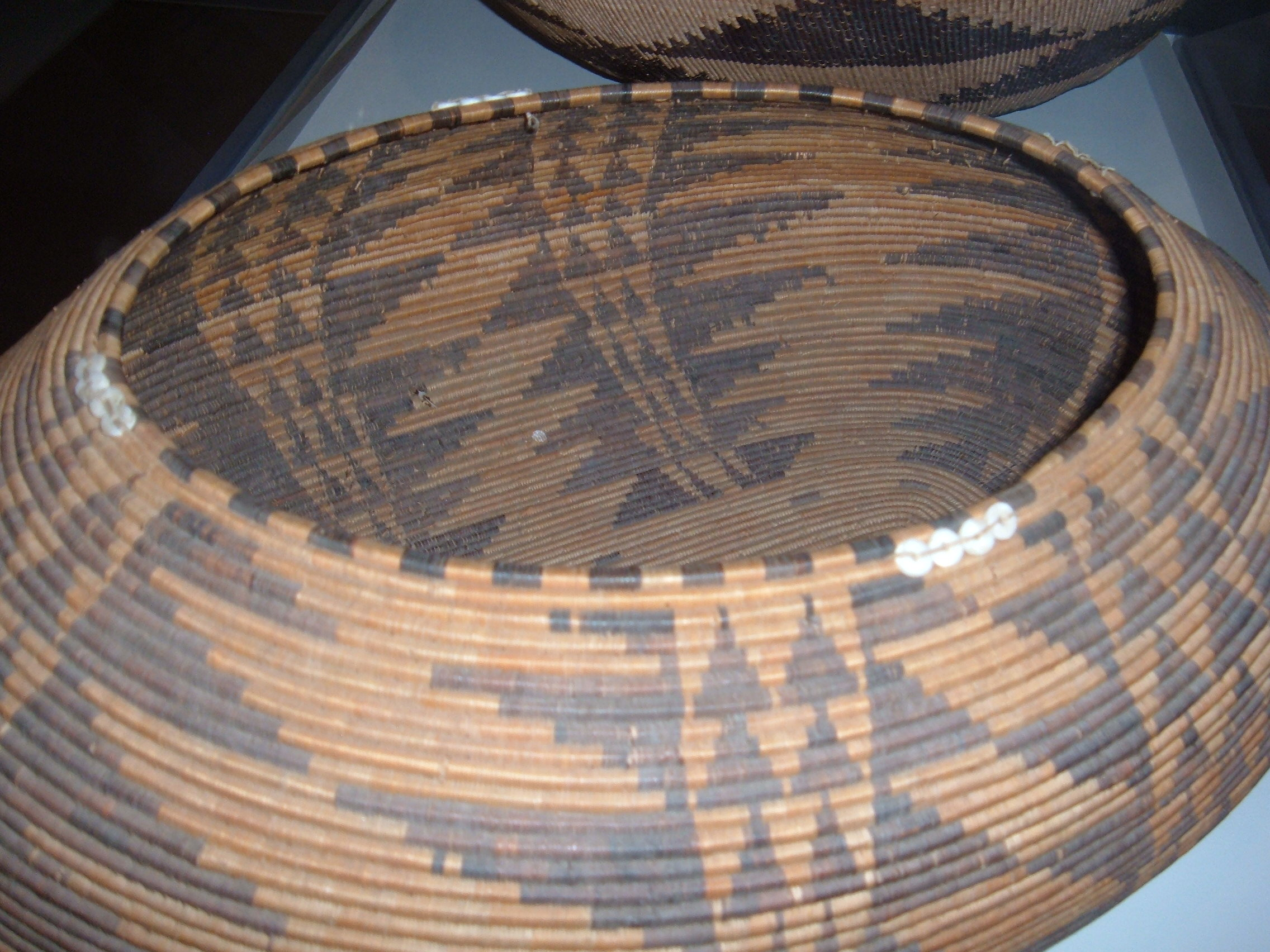
A basket made by the Pomo people of northern California.

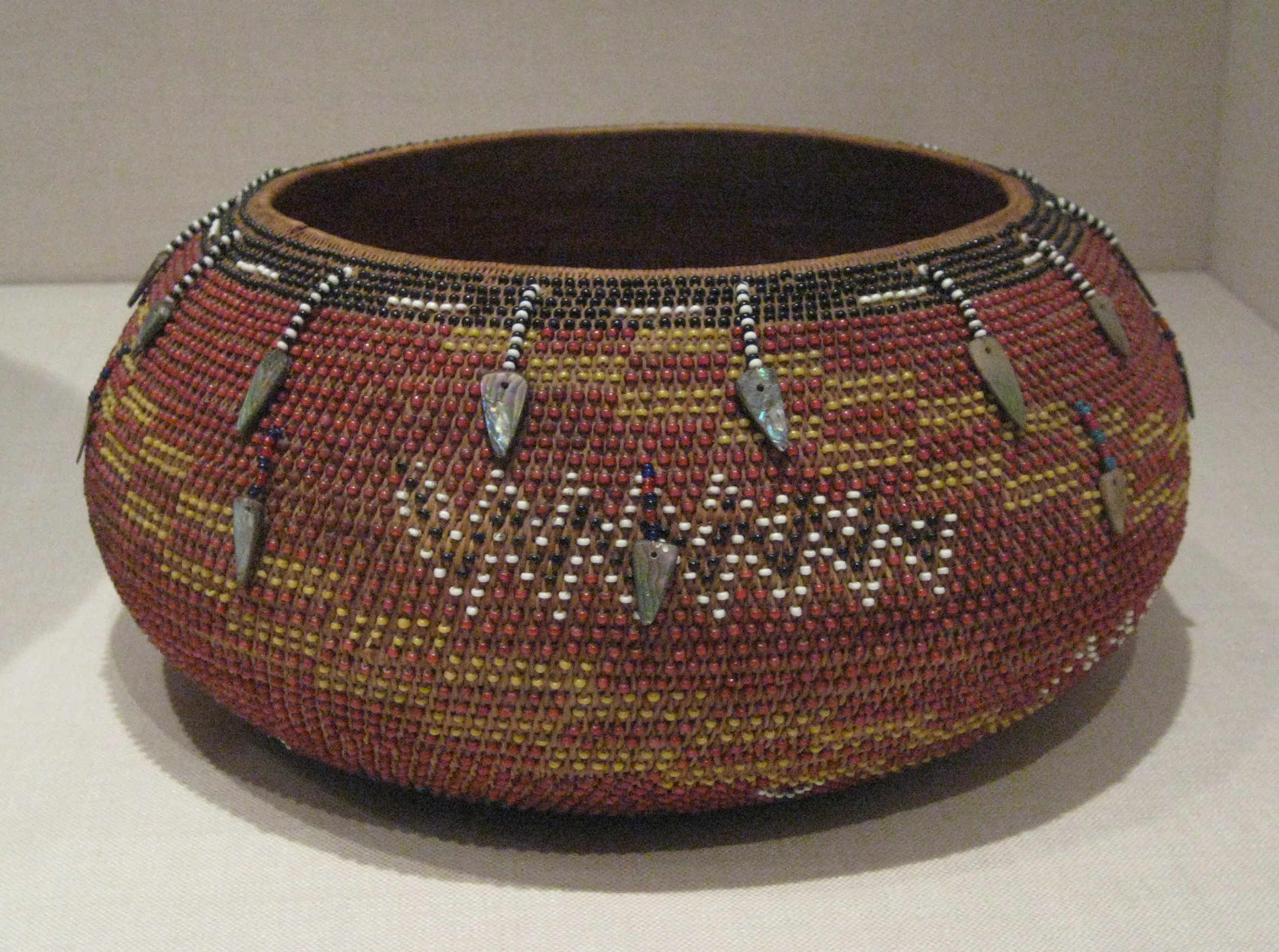
Pomo beaded, coiled basket, sedgeroot, willow, glass beads, abalone, circa 1880

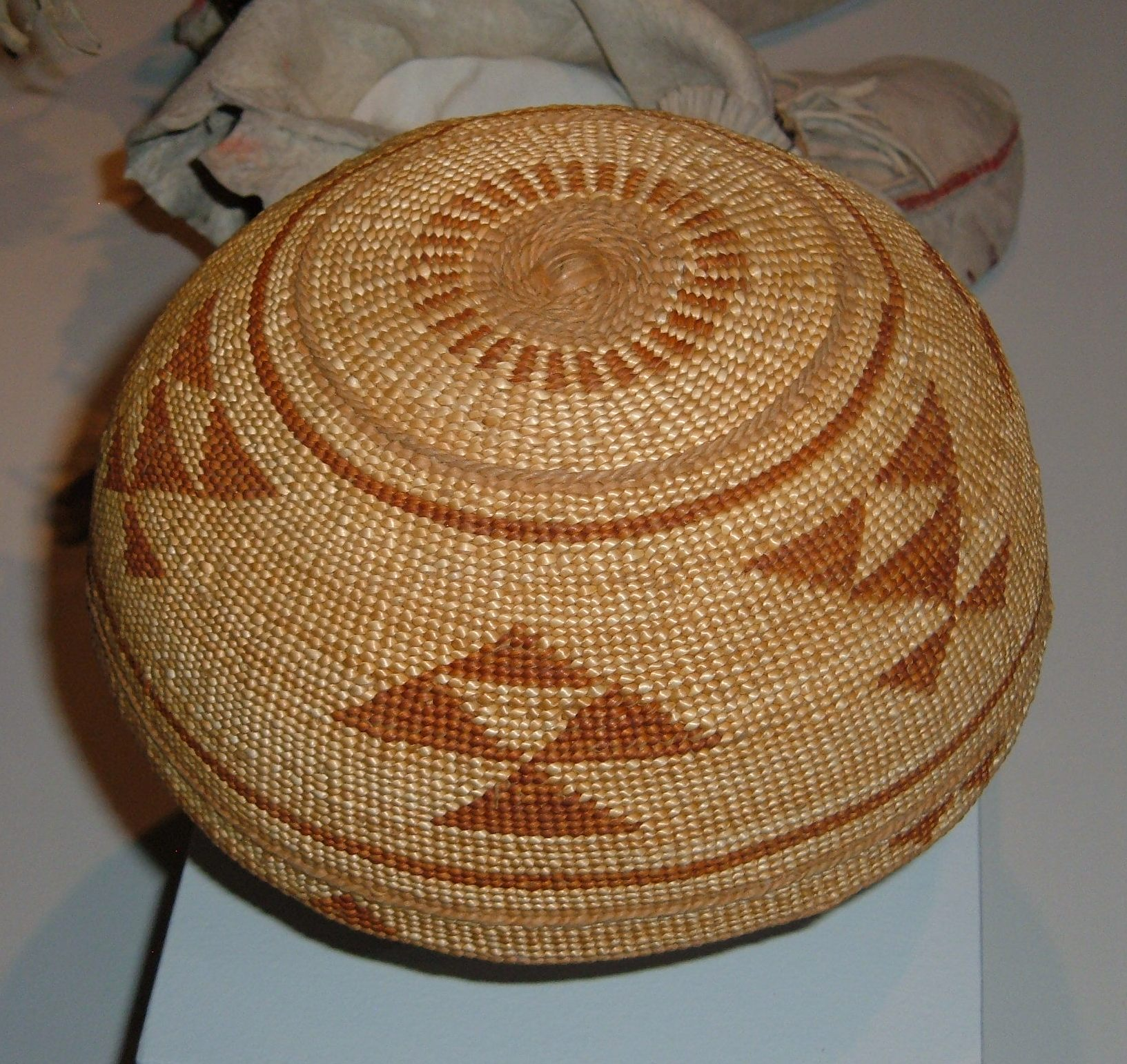
Late 19th-century Hupa woman's cap, bear grass and conifer root, Stanford University

=== Southwest ===
In the Southwestern United States numerous pictographs and petroglyphs were created. The Fremont culture and Ancestral Puebloans and later tribes' creations, in the Barrier Canyon Style and others, are seen at present day Buckhorn Draw Pictograph Panel and Horseshoe Canyon, among other sites. Petroglyphs by these and the Mogollon culture's artists are represented in Dinosaur National Monument and at Newspaper Rock.

The Ancestral Puebloans, or Anasazi, (1000 BCE–700 CE) are the ancestors of today's Pueblo tribes. Their culture formed in the American southwest, after the cultivation of corn was introduced from Mexico around 1200 BCE. People of this region developed an agrarian lifestyle, cultivating food, storage gourds, and cotton with irrigation or xeriscaping techniques. They lived in sedentary towns, so pottery, used to store water and grain, was ubiquitous.

For hundreds of years, Ancestral Pueblo created utilitarian grayware and black-on-white pottery and occasionally orange or red ceramics. In historical times, Hopi created ollas, dough bowls, and food bowls of different sizes for daily use, but they also made more elaborate ceremonial mugs, jugs, ladles, seed jars and those vessels for ritual use, and these were usually finished with polished surfaces and decorated with black painted designs. At the turn of the 20th century, Hopi potter Nampeyo famous revived Sikyátki-style pottery, originated on First Mesa in the 14th to 17th centuries.

Southwest architecture includes Cliff dwellings, multi-story settlements carved from living rock; pit houses; and adobe and sandstone pueblos. One of the most elaborate and largest ancient settlements is Chaco Canyon in New Mexico, which includes 15 major complexes of sandstone and timber. These are connected by a network of roads. Construction for the largest of these settlements, Pueblo Bonito, began 1080 years before present. Pueblo Bonito contains over 800 rooms.

Turquoise, jet, and spiny oyster shell have been traditionally used by Ancestral Pueblo for jewelry, and they developed sophisticated inlay techniques centuries ago.

Around 200 CE the Hohokam culture developed in Arizona. They are the ancestors of the Tohono O'odham and Akimel O'odham or Pima tribes. The Mimbres, a subgroup of the Mogollon culture, are especially notable for the narrative paintings on their pottery.

Within the last millennium, Athabaskan peoples emigrated from northern Canada in the southwest. These include the Navajo and Apache. Sandpainting is an aspect of Navajo healing ceremonies that inspired an art form. Navajos learned to weave on upright looms from Pueblos and wove blankets that were eagerly collected by Great Basin and Plains tribes in the 18th and 19th centuries. After the introduction of the railroad in the 1880s, imported blankets became plentiful and inexpensive, so Navajo weavers switched to producing rugs for trade.

In the 1850s, Navajos adopted silversmithing from the Mexicans. Atsidi Sani (Old Smith) was the first Navajo silversmith, but he had many students, and the technology quickly spread to surrounding tribes. Today thousands of artists produce silver jewelry with turquoise. Hopi are renowned for their overlay silver work and cottonwood carvings. Zuni artists are admired for their cluster work jewelry, showcasing turquoise designs, as well as their elaborate, pictorial stone inlay in silver.

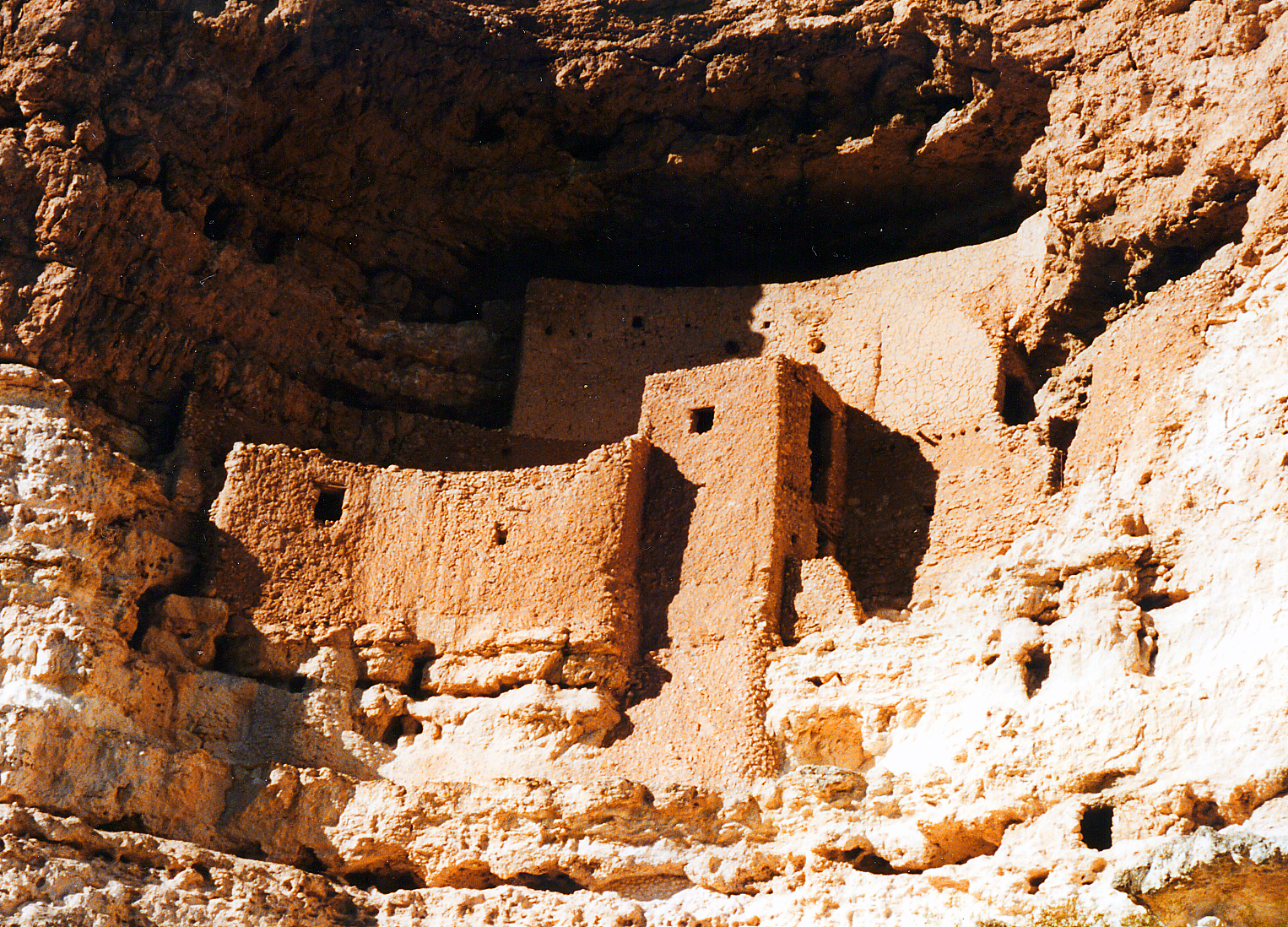
Montezuma Castle, a Sinagua cliff dwelling in Arizona, c. 700 CE–1425 CE

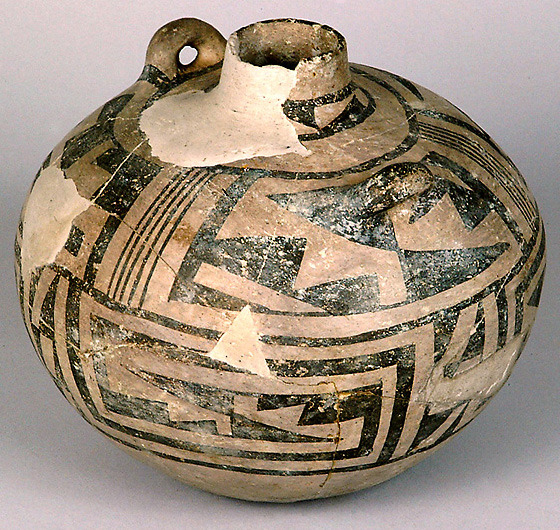
Ancestral Pueblo canteen, Chaco Canyon, New Mexico, c. 700 CE–1100 CE

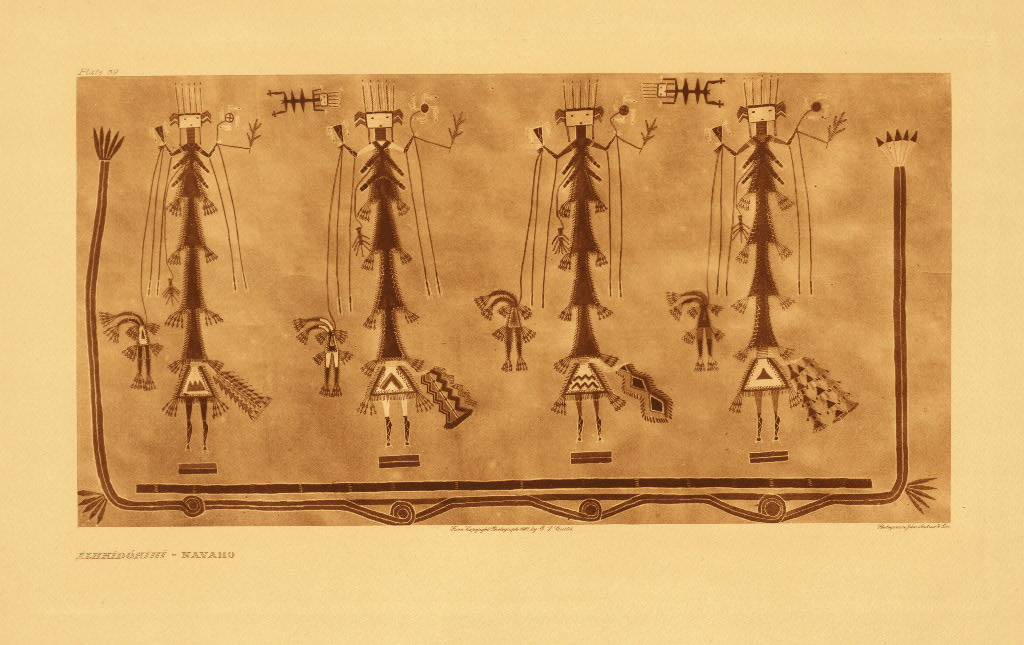
Navajo Sandpainting.

== Mesoamerica and Central America ==
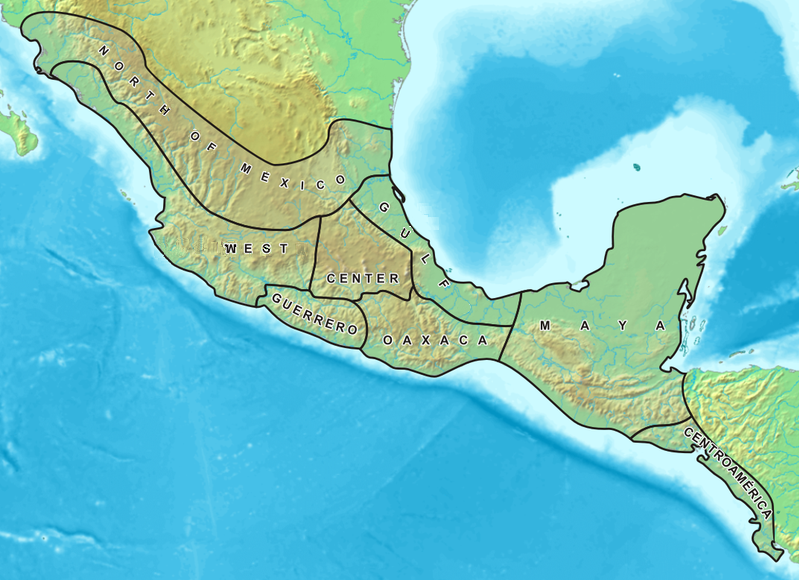
Map of the Mesoamerican cultural region

The cultural development of ancient Mesoamerica was generally divided along east and west. "Archaeologists have dated human presence in Mesoamerica to possibly as early as 21,000 BCE" (Jeff Wallenfeldt). The stable Maya culture was most dominant in the east, especially the Yucatán Peninsula, while in the west more varied developments took place in subregions. These included West Mexican (1000–1), Teotihuacan (1–500), Mixtec (1000–1200), and Aztec (1200–1521).

Central American civilizations generally lived to the regions south of modern-day Mexico, although there was some overlap between the places.

=== Mesoamerica ===
Mesoamerica was home to the following cultures, among others:

==== Olmec ====
The Olmec (1500–400 BCE), who lived on the gulf coast, were the first civilization to fully develop in Mesoamerica. Their culture was the first to develop many traits that remained constant in Mesoamerica until the last days of the Aztecs: a complex astronomical calendar, the ritual practice of a ball game, and the erection of stelae to commemorate victories or other important events.

The most famous artistic creations of the Olmec are colossal basalt heads, believed to be portraits of rulers that were erected to advertise their great power. The Olmec also sculpted votive figurines that they buried beneath the floors of their houses for unknown reasons. These were most often modeled in terracotta, but also occasionally carved from jade or serpentine.

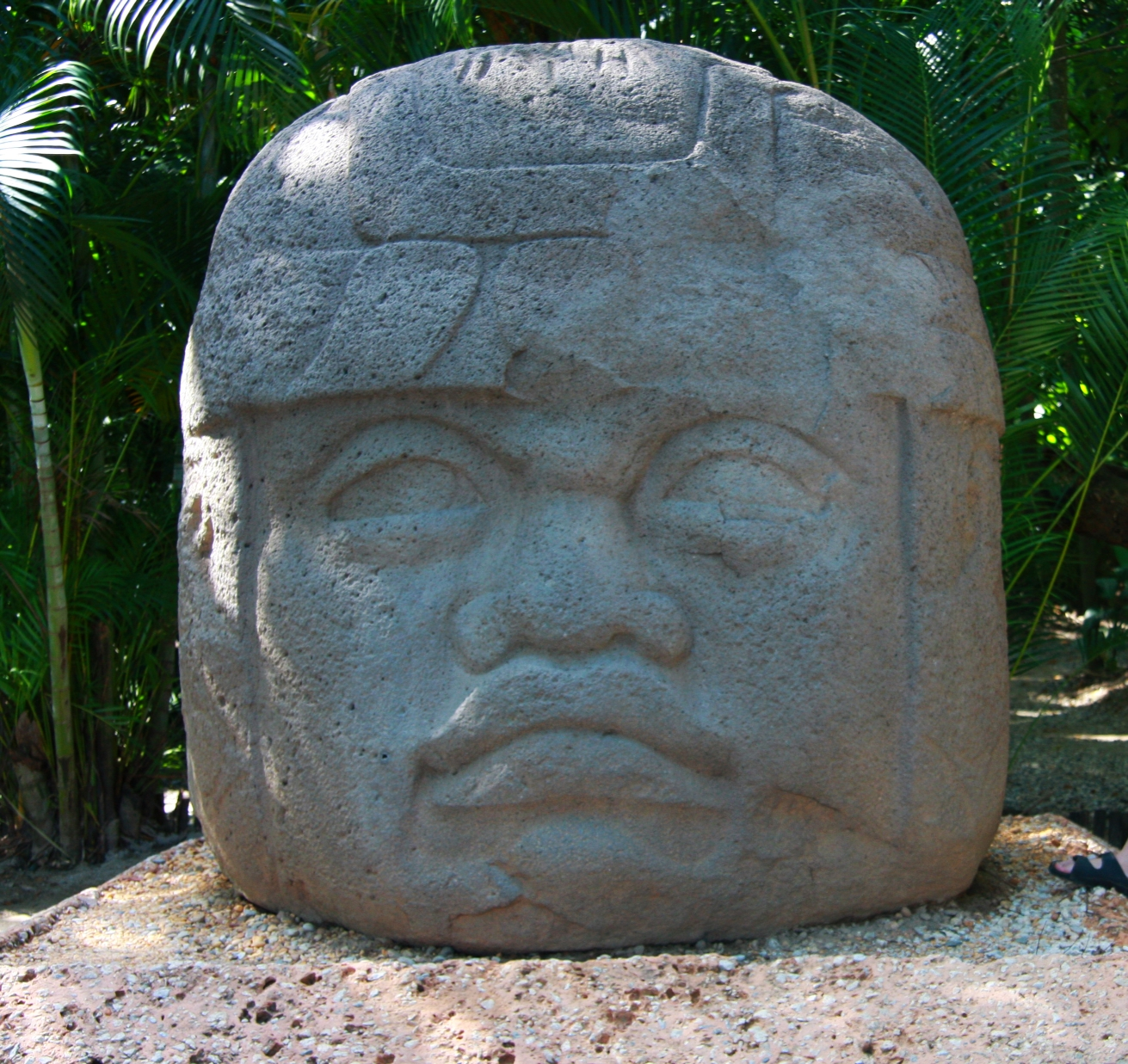
Monument 1, one of the four Olmec colossal heads at La Venta. This one is nearly 3 metres (9 ft) tall.

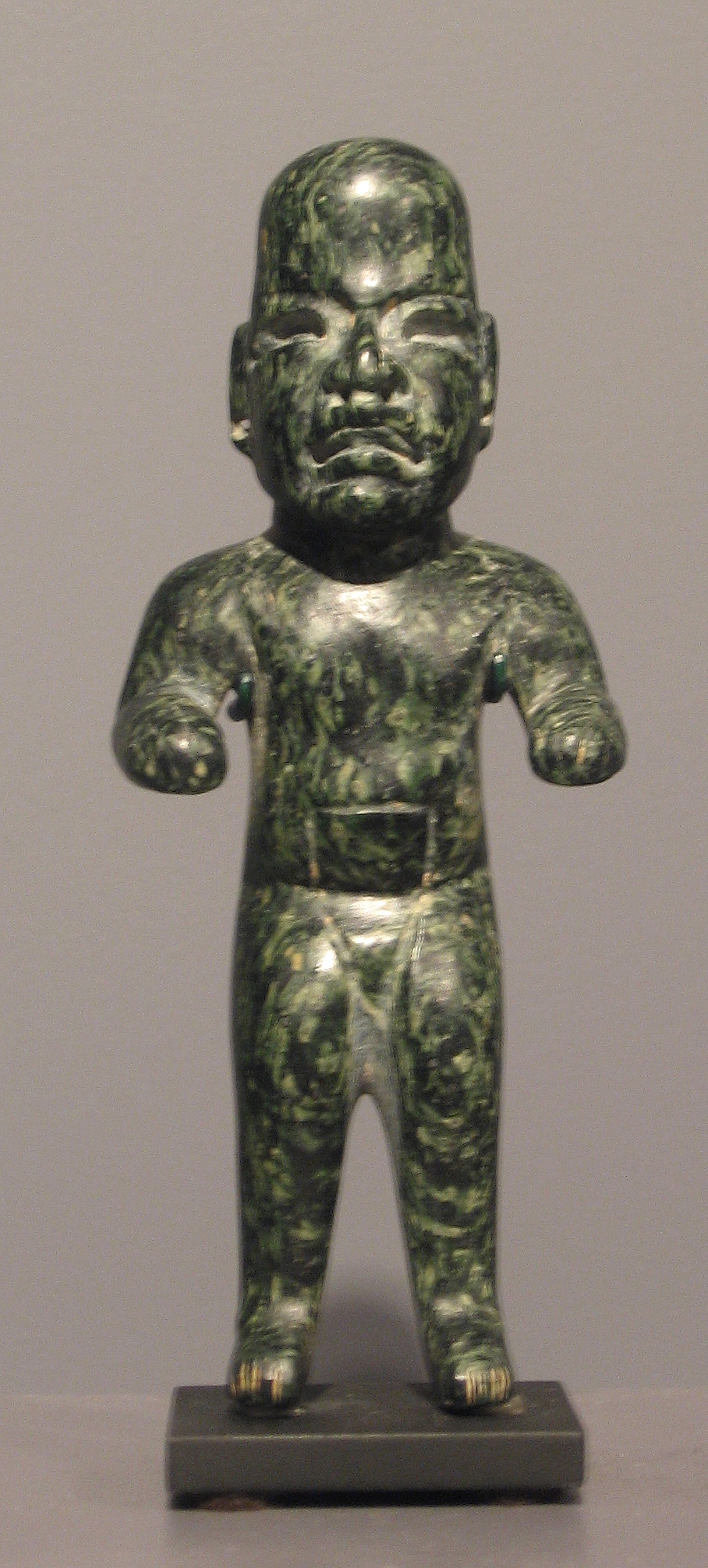
An "elongated man" figurine, dark green serpentine.

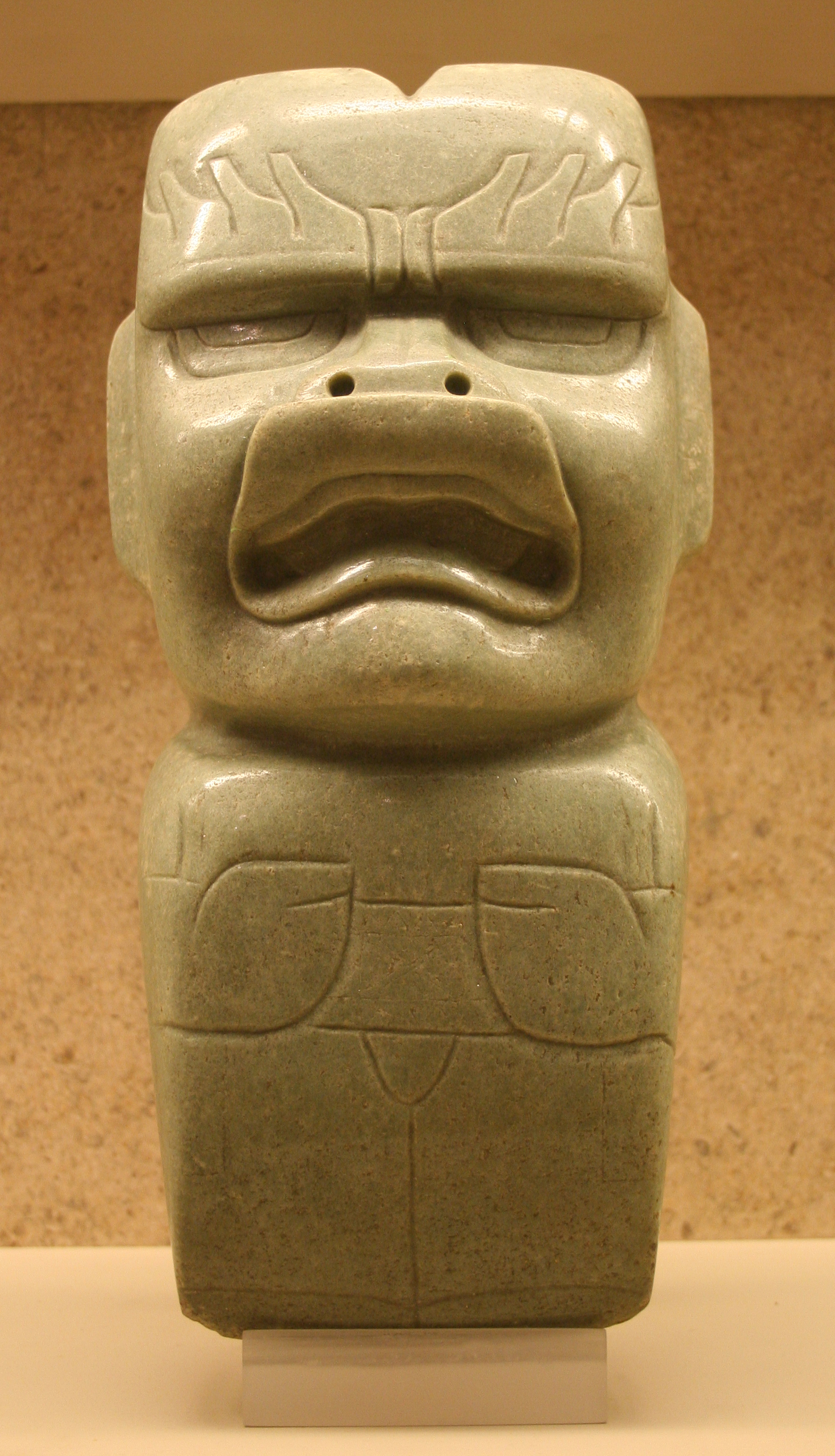
Kunz Axe; 1200-400 BCE; polished green quartz (aventurine); height: 29 cm, width: 13.5 cm; British Museum (London)

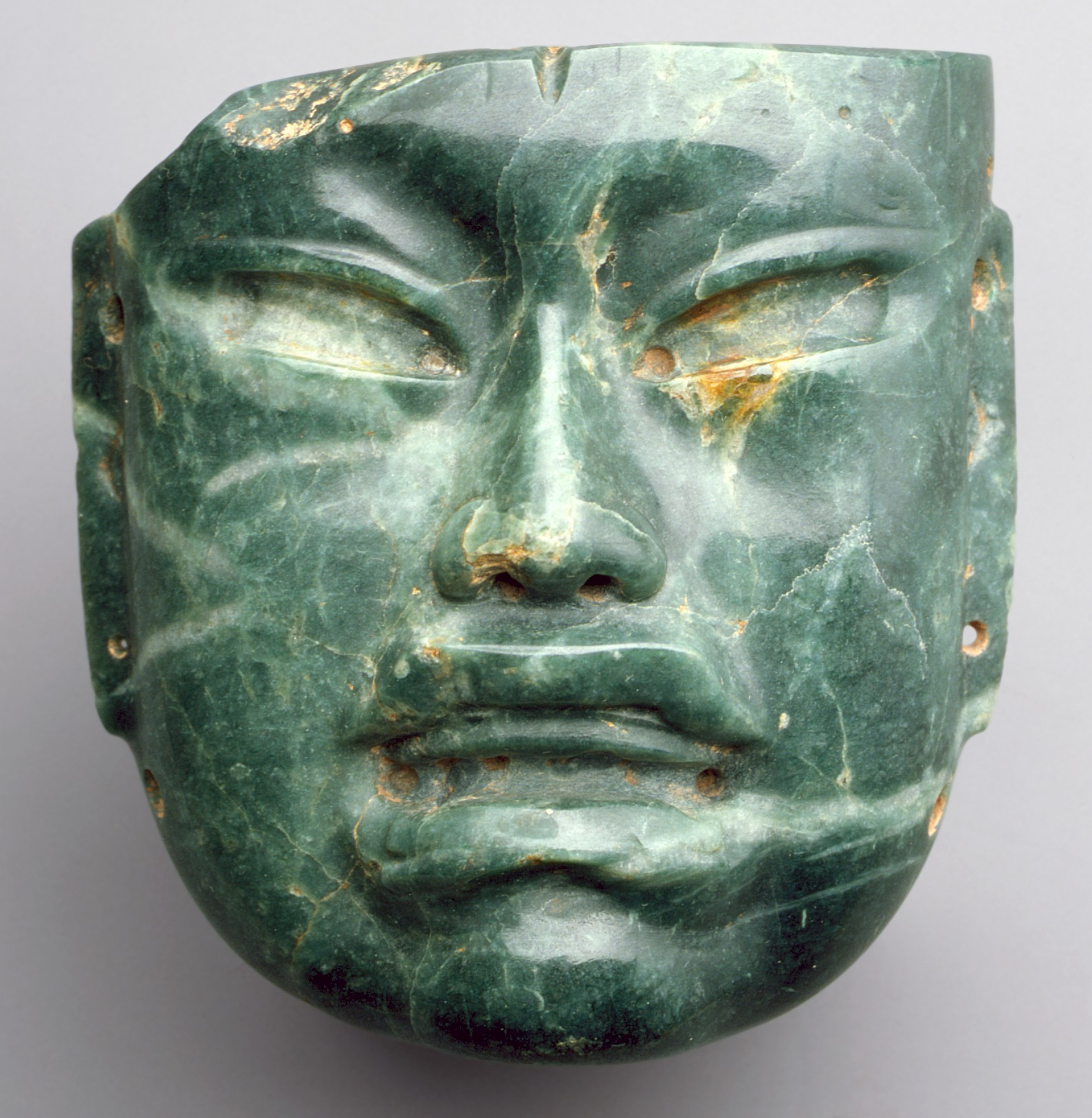
Jade mask; 10th–6th century BCE; jadeite; height: 17.1 cm (6 3/4 in.), width: 16.5 (6 5/16 in.); Metropolitan Museum of Art (New York City)

==== Teotihuacan ====
Teotihuacan was a city built in the Valley of Mexico, containing some of the largest pyramidal structures built in the pre-Columbian Americas. Established around 200 BCE, the city fell between the 7th and 8th century CE. Teotihuacan has numerous well-preserved murals.

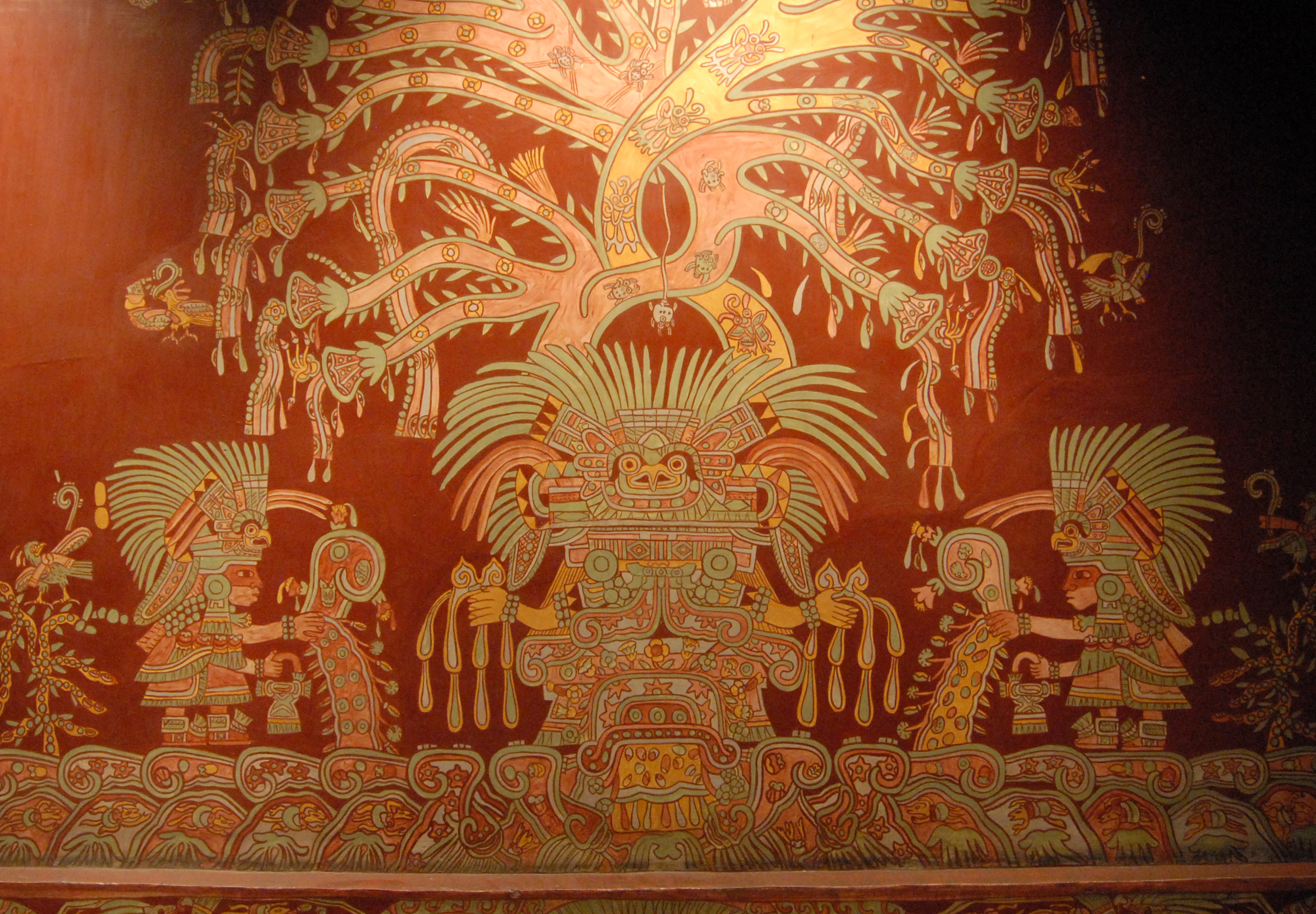
A mural showing what has been identified as the Great Goddess of Teotihuacan

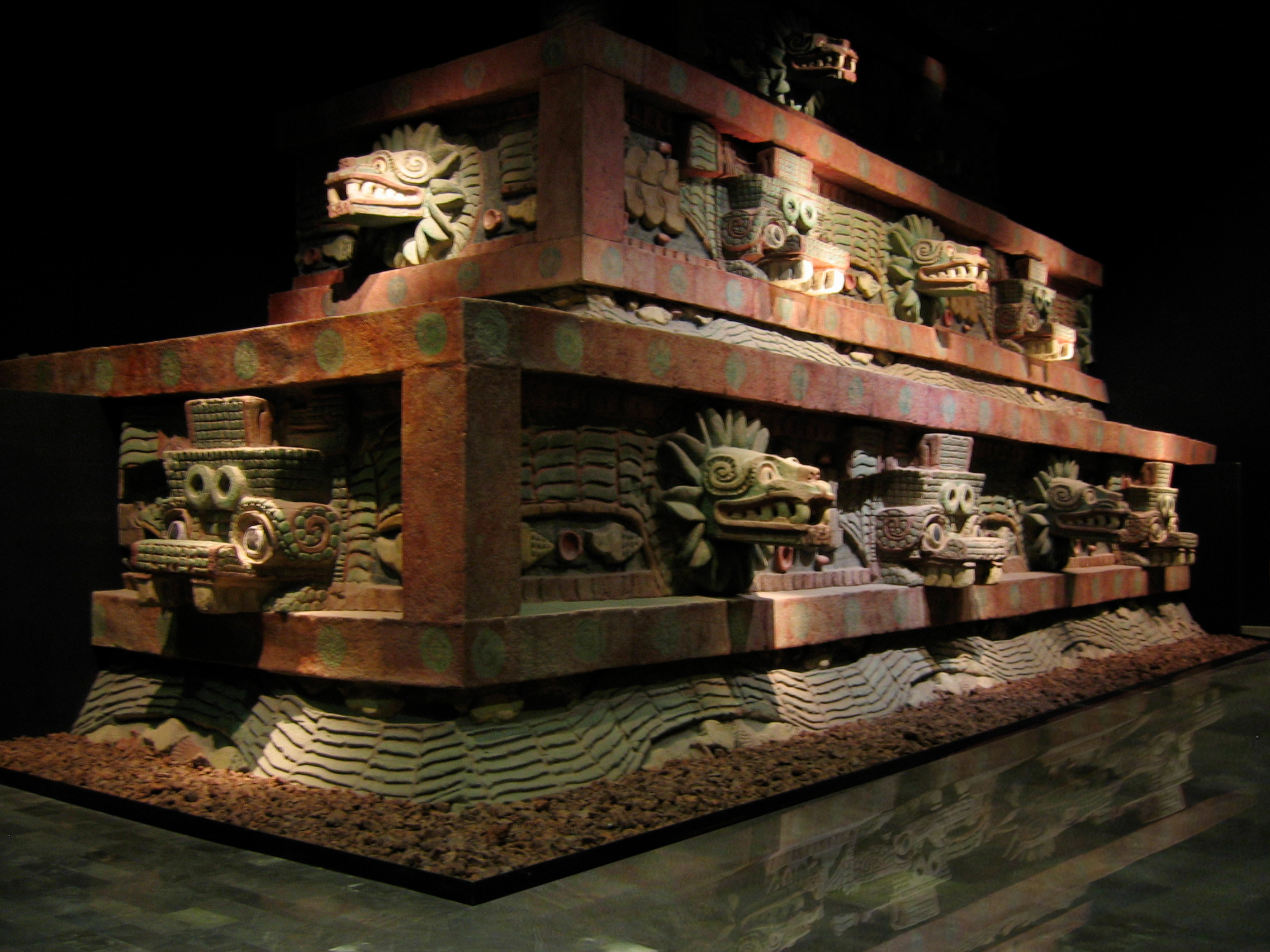
Restored Teotihuacan architecture showing typical Mesoamerican use of red paint complemented on gold and jade decoration upon marble and granite

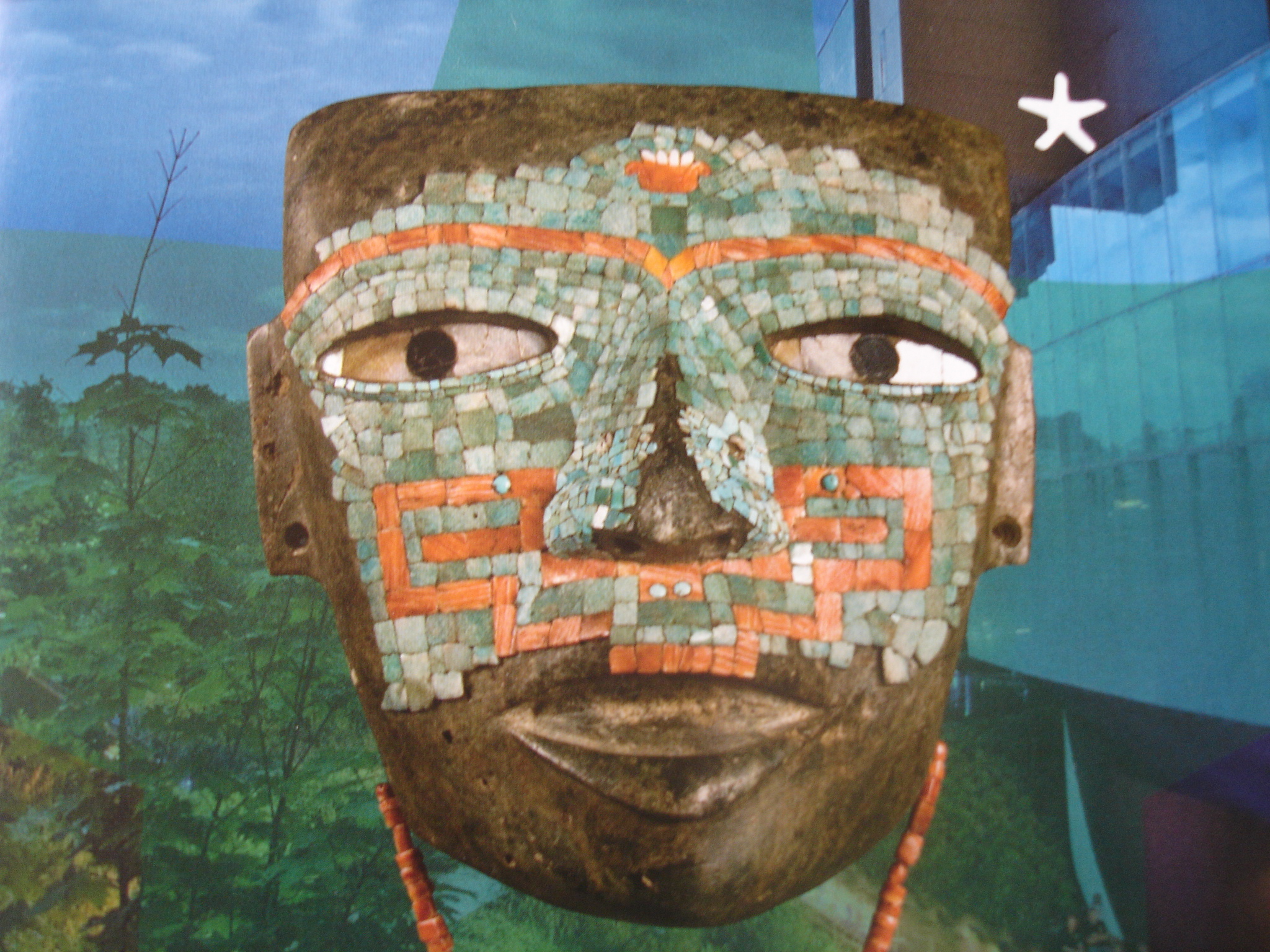
Mask with a necklace with 55 beads and pendant; serpentine inlaid with amazonite, turquoise, shell, coral and obsidian, 8 in. H, National Museum of Anthropology

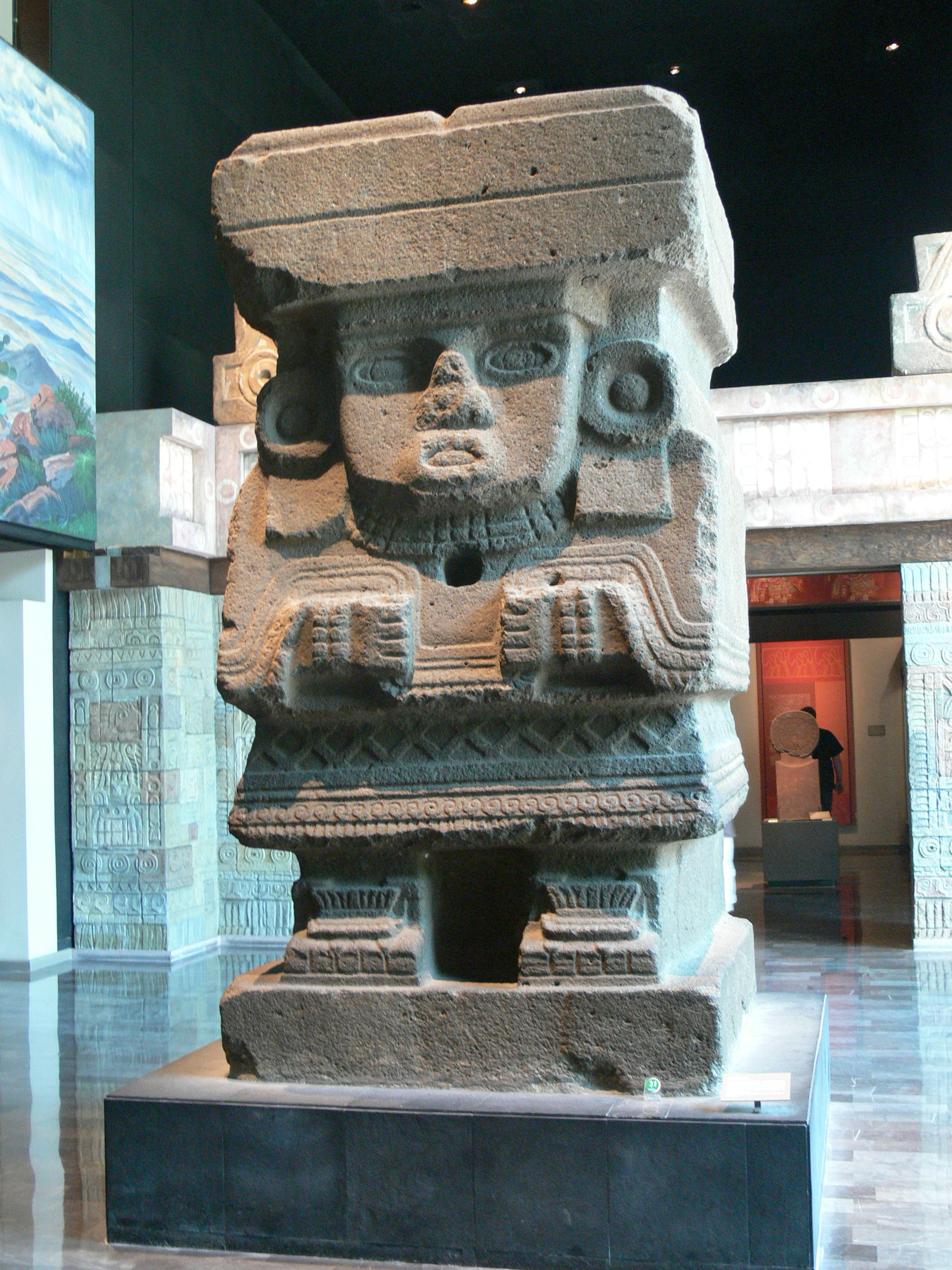
Statue of Chalchiuhtlicue; National Museum of Anthropology

==== Classic Veracruz Culture ====
In his 1957 book on Mesoamerican art, Miguel Covarrubias speaks of Remojadas' "magnificent hollow figures with expressive faces, in majestic postures and wearing elaborate paraphernalia indicated by added clay elements."

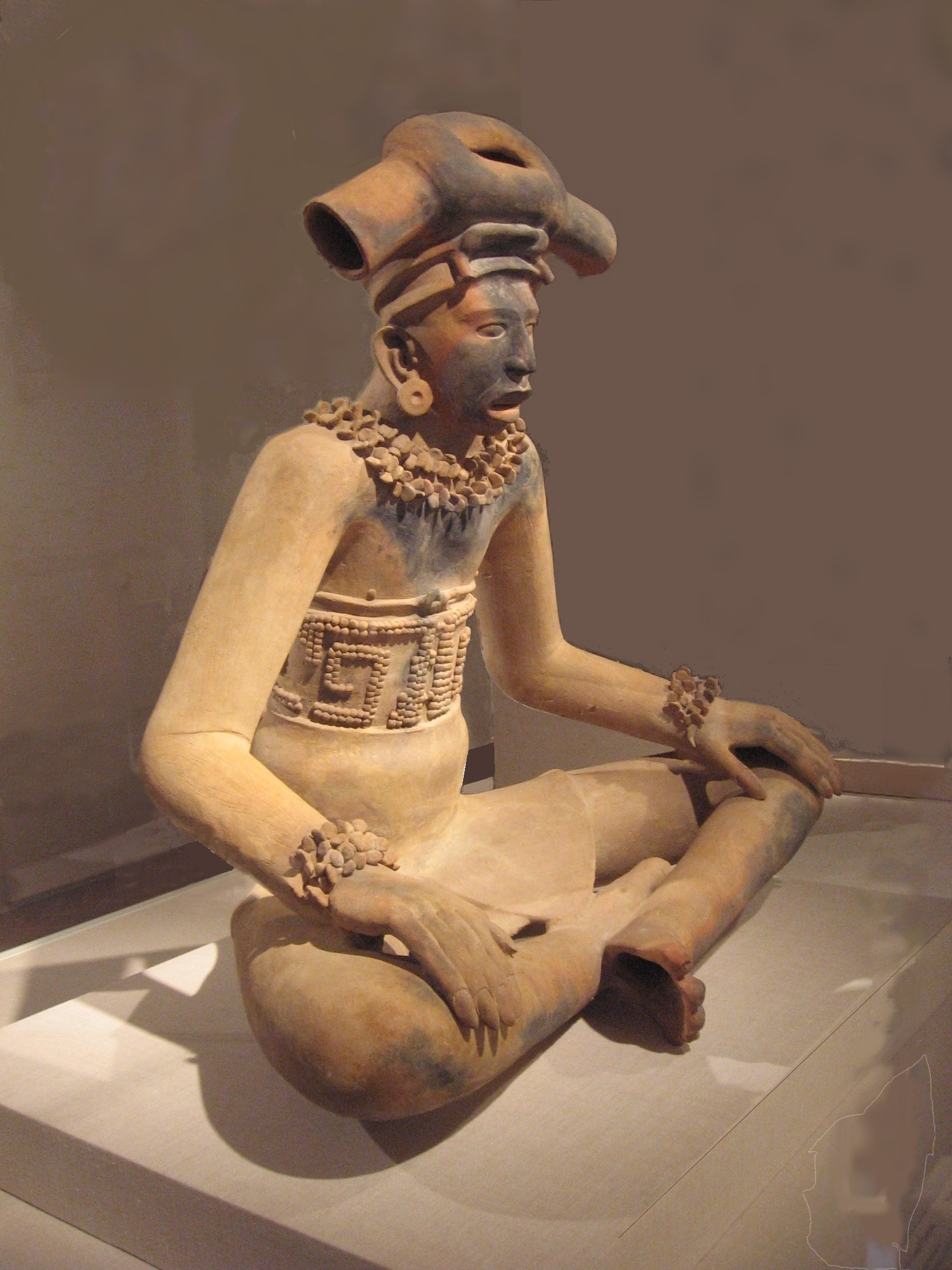
A large terracotta figurine of a young chieftain in the Remojadas style. 300–600 CE; Height: 31 in (79 cm).

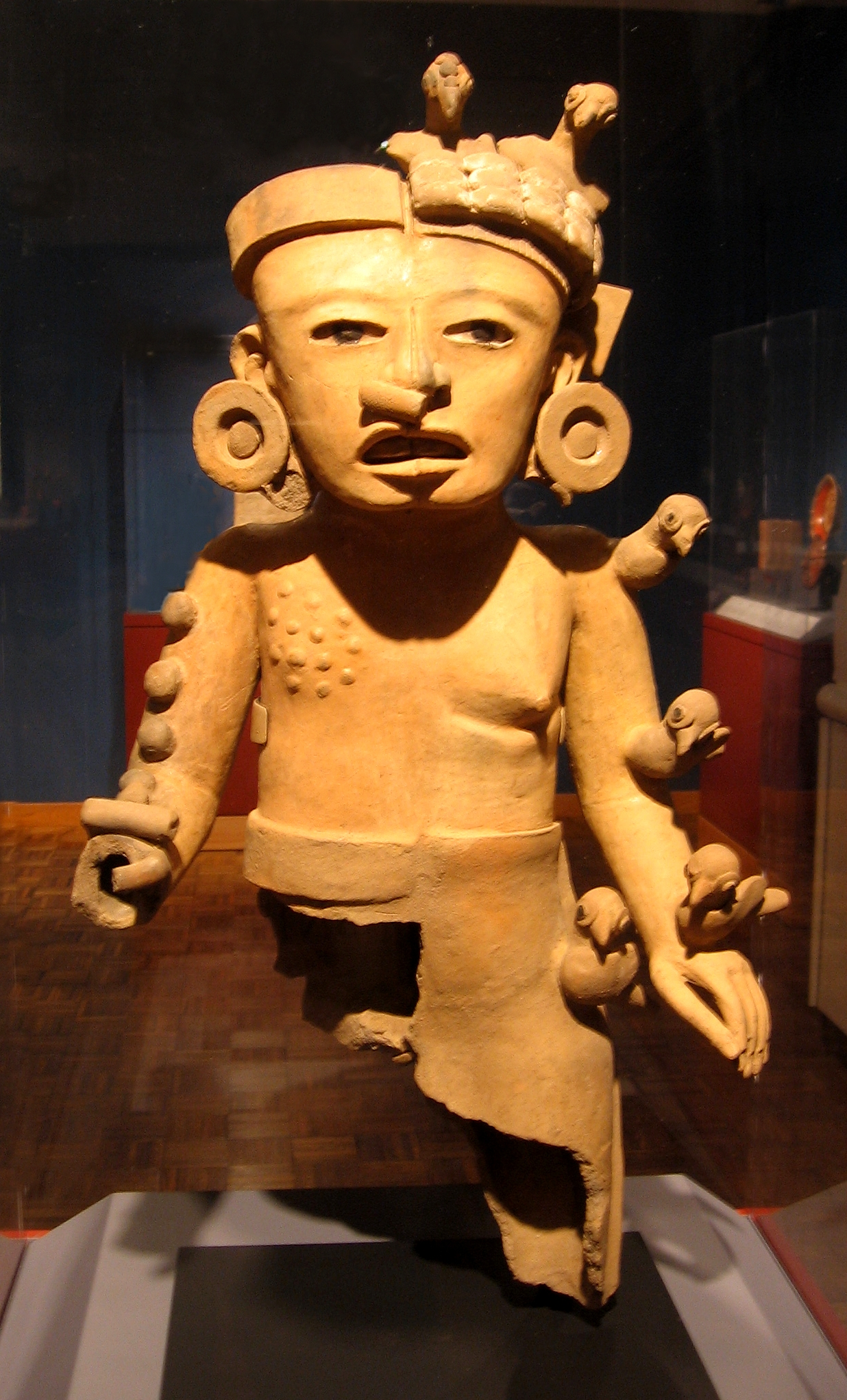
Male-female duality figure from Remojadas, 200–500 CE. Note the feminine breast and birds on the right side of the figure.

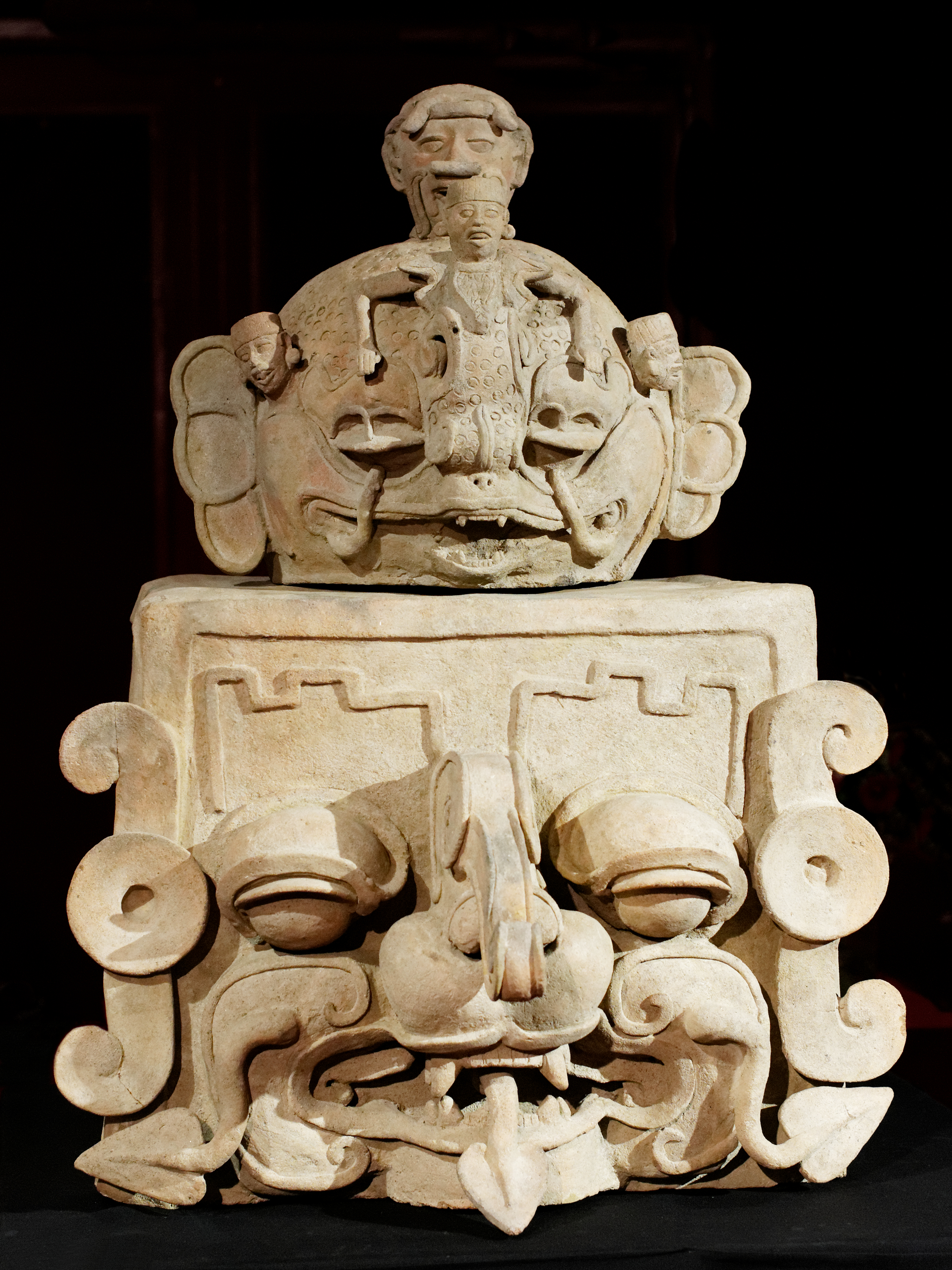
Veracruz altar urn

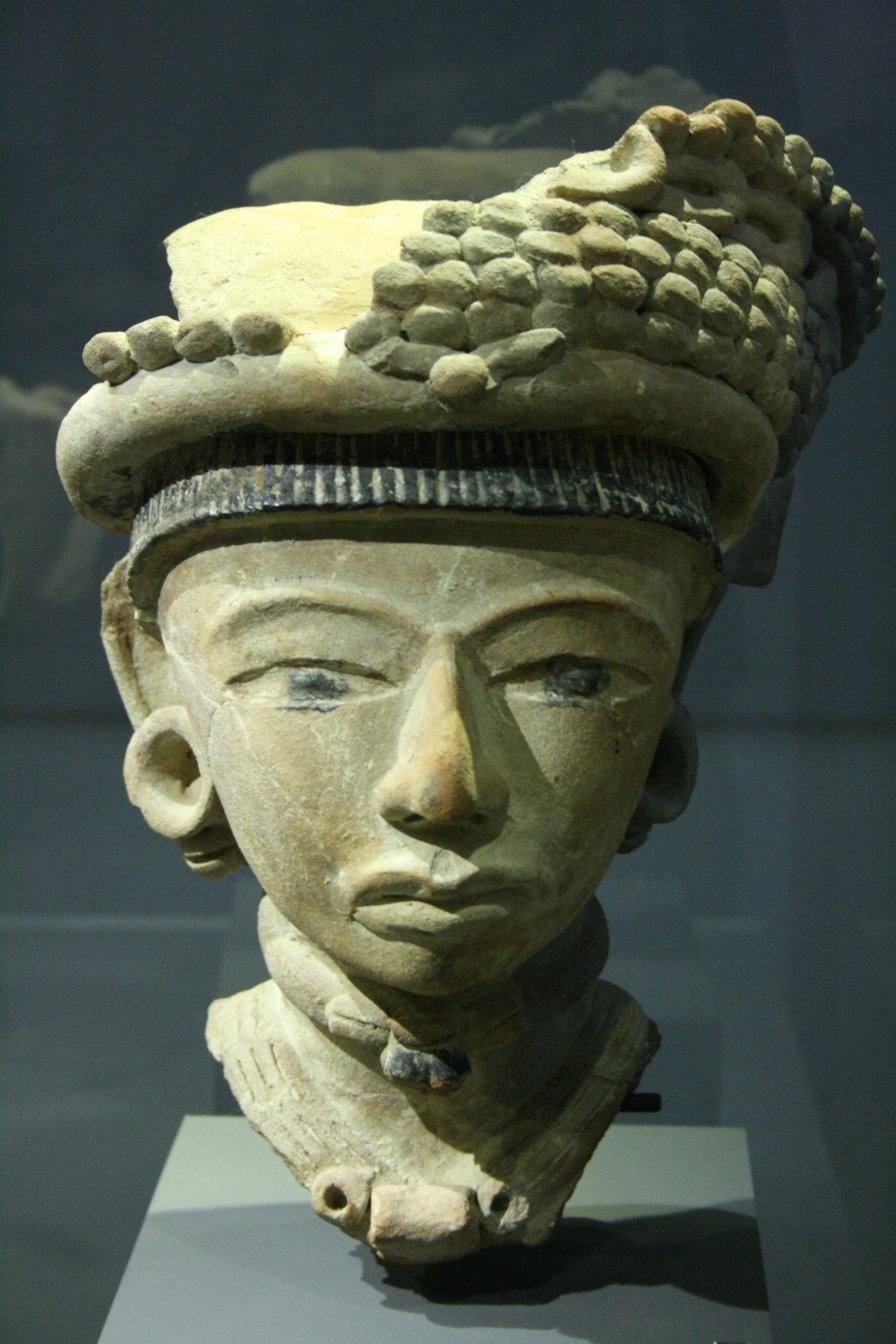
Stone head of a woman from El Tajin

==== Zapotec ====
"The Bat God was one of the important deities of the Maya, many elements of whose religion were shared also by the Zapotec. The Bat God in particular is known to have been revered also by the Zapotec ... He was especially associated ... with the underworld." An important Zapotec center was Monte Albán, in present-day Oaxaca, Mexico. The Monte Albán periods are divided into I, II, and III, which range from 200 BCE to 600 CE.

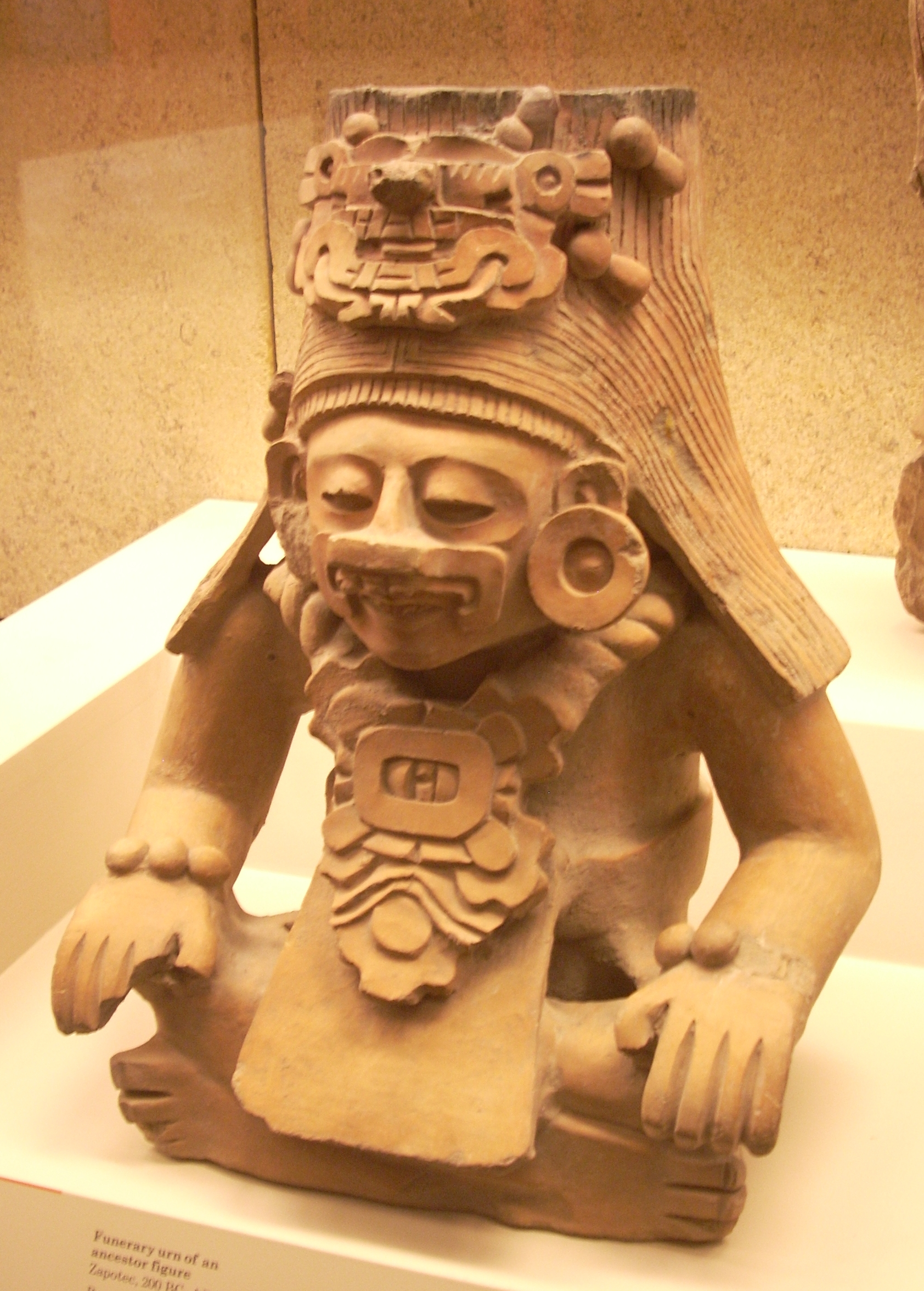
Ceramic urn, 200 BCE – 800 CE, British Museum.

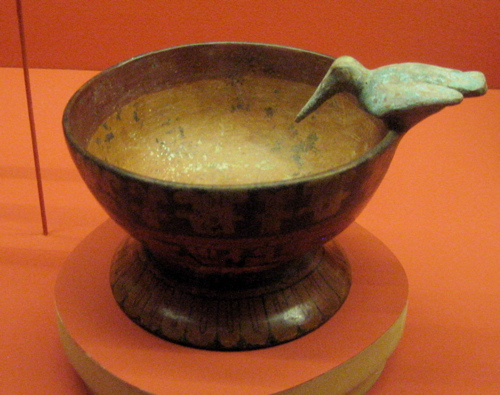
Ceramic Zapotec vessel

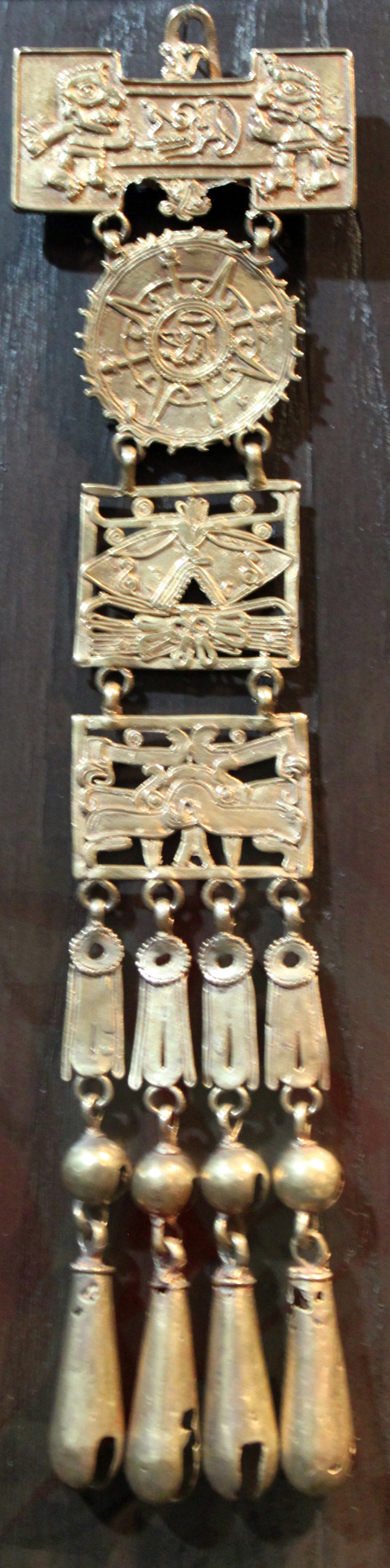
Golden ornamentation worn by Zapotec government officials

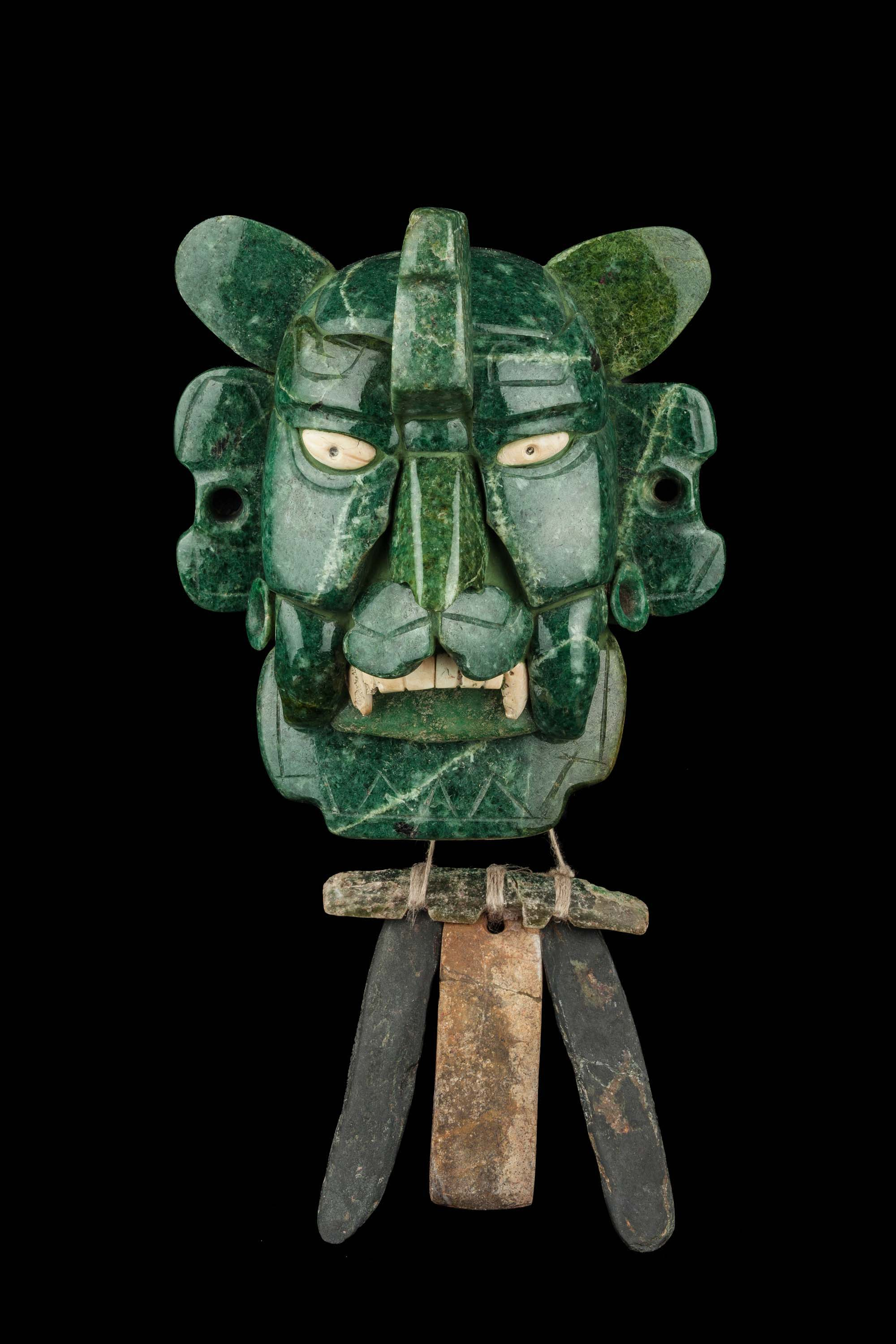
Mosaic mask that represents a Bat god, 25 pieces of jade, with yellow eyes made of shell. It was found in a tomb at Monte Albán

==== Maya ====
The Maya civilization occupied the south of Mexico, all of Guatemala and Belize, and the western portions of Honduras and El Salvador.

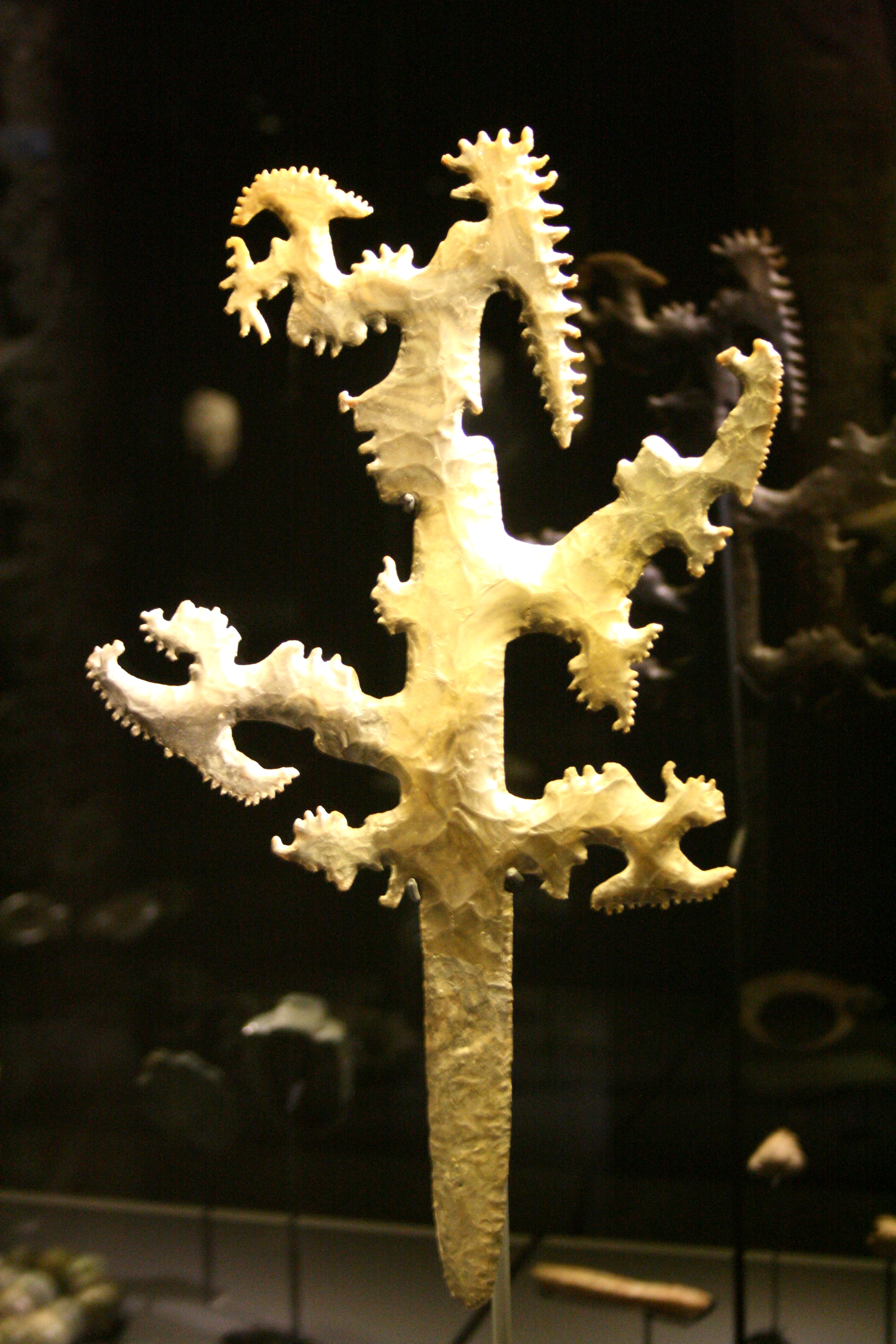
Classic Period Maya eccentric flint, possibly from Copán or Quiriguá, Musées Roayaux d'art et d'Histoire, Brussels

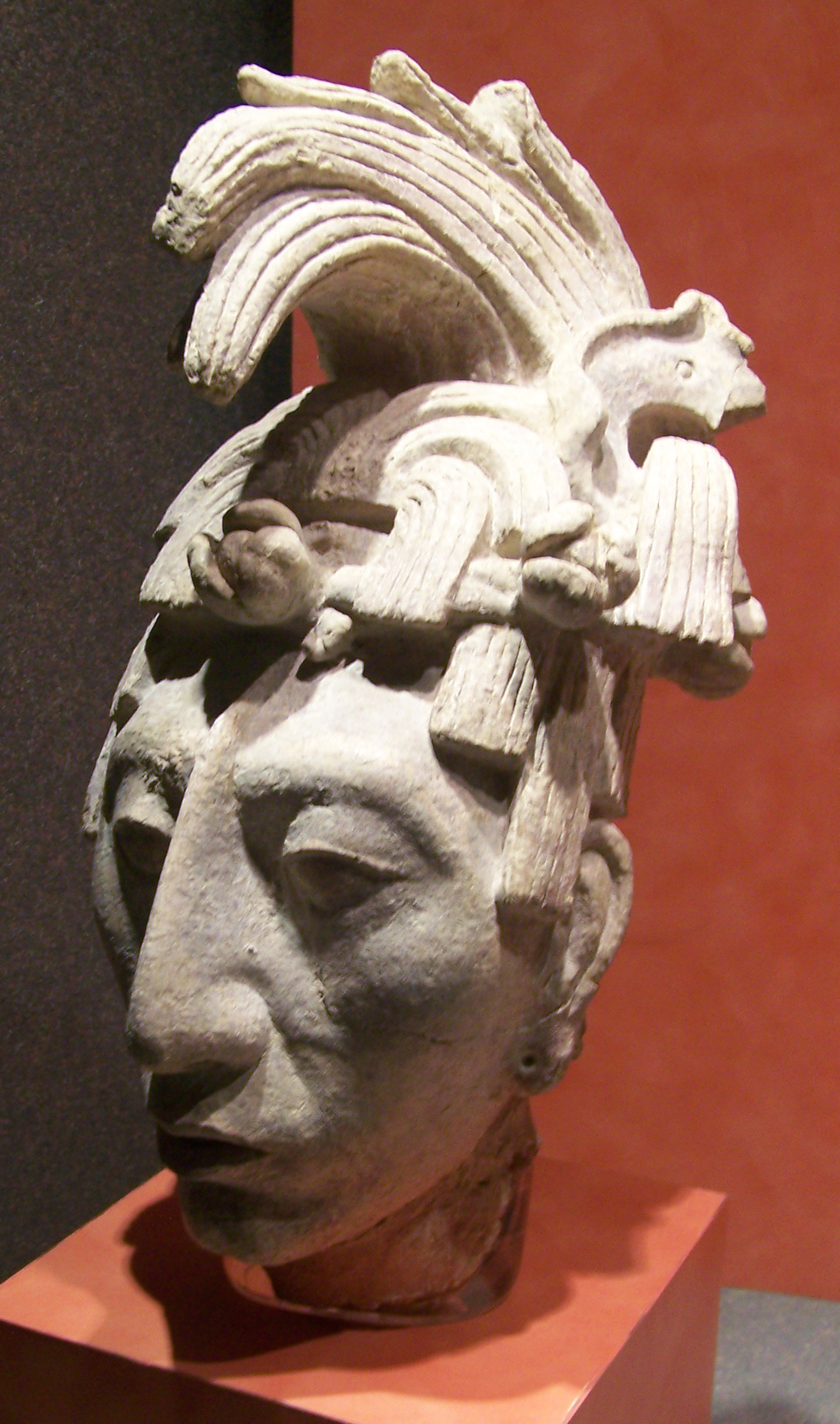
Portrait of K'inich Janaab Pakal I; 615–683; stucco; height: 43 cm (1 ft 5 in.); National Museum of Anthropology (Mexico City)

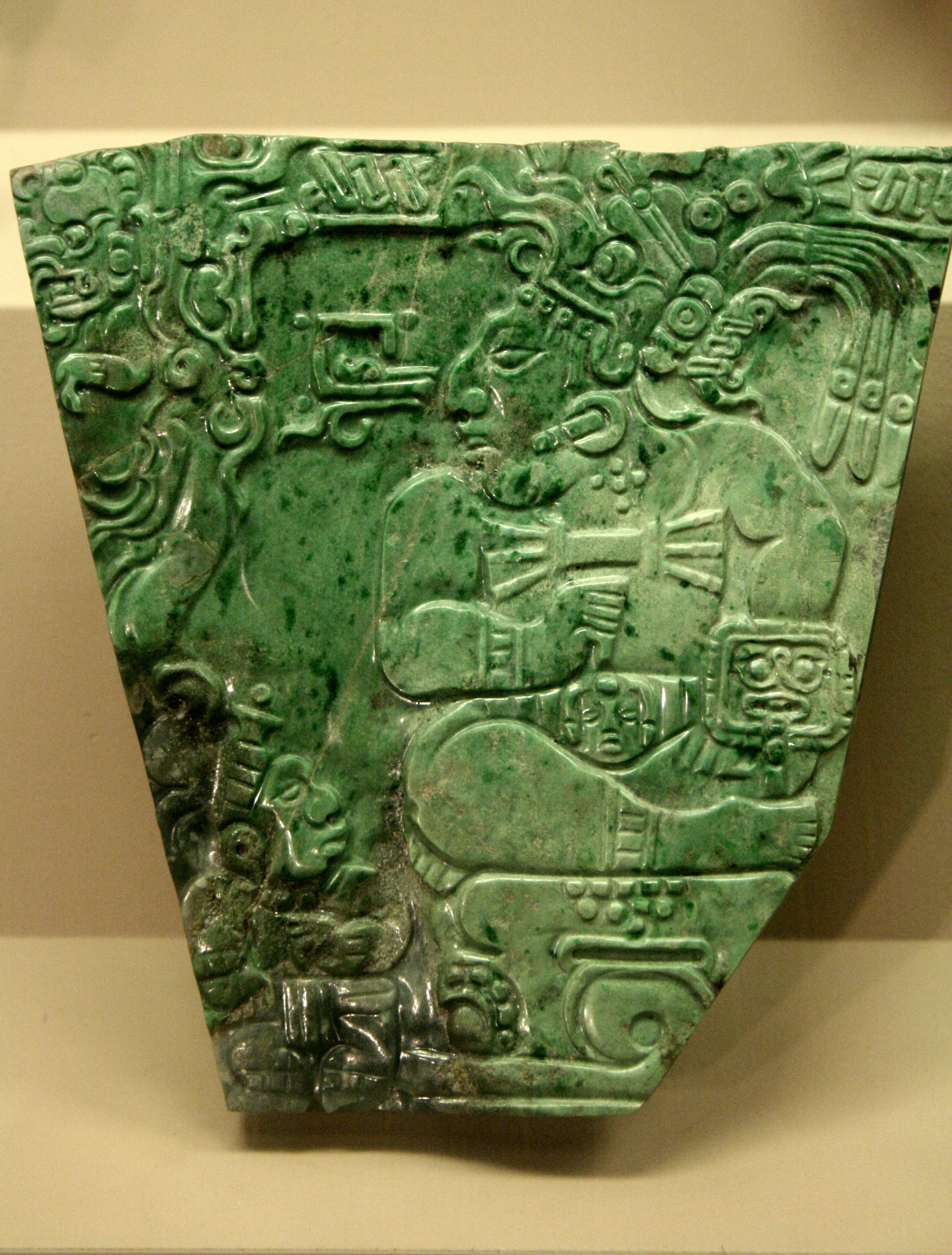
Jade plaque of a Maya king; 400-800 (Classic period); height: 14 cm, width: 14 cm; found at Teotihuacan; British Museum (London).

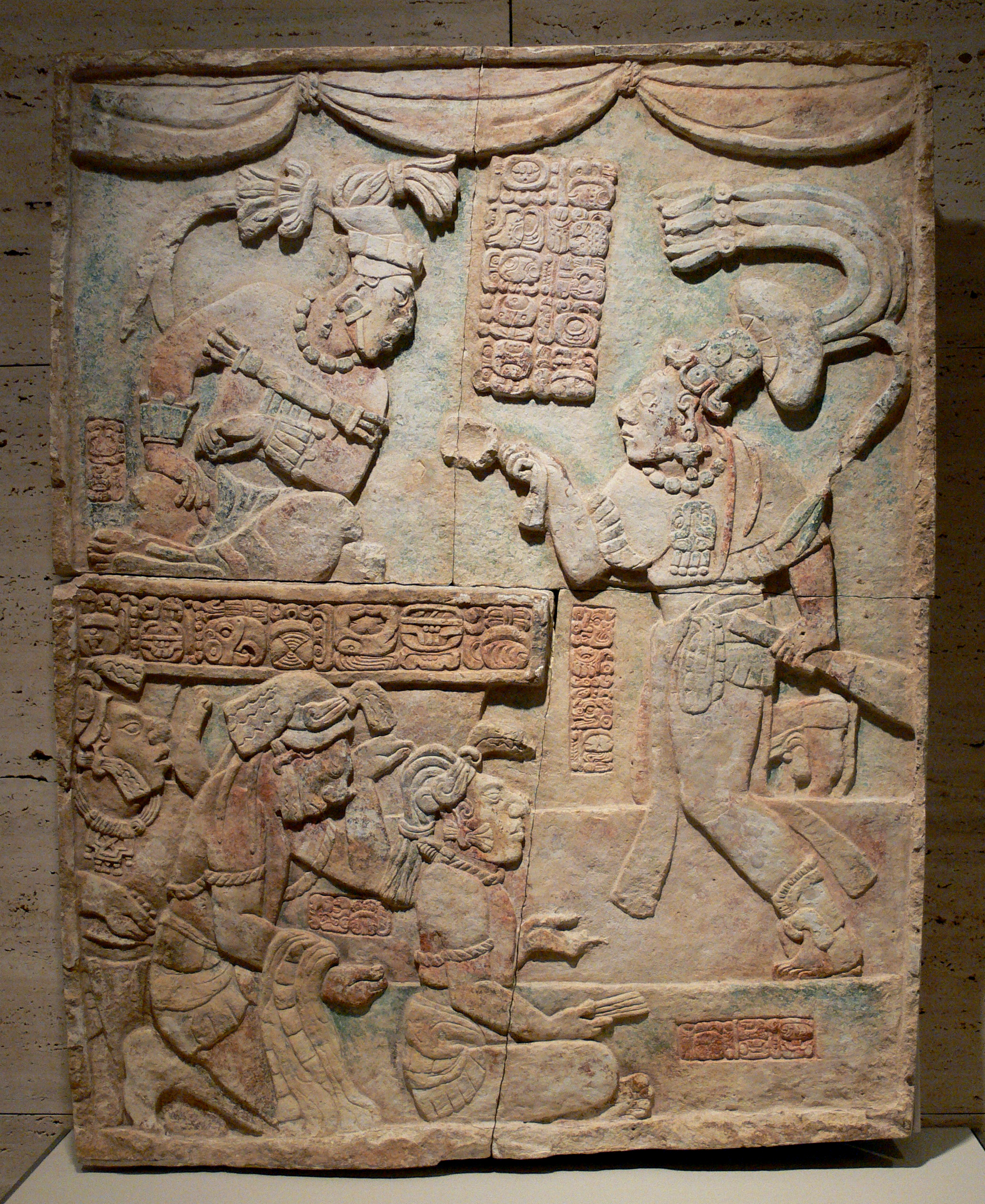
Relief showing Aj Chak Maax presenting captives before ruler Itzamnaaj B'alam III of Yaxchilan; 22 August 783

==== Toltec ====
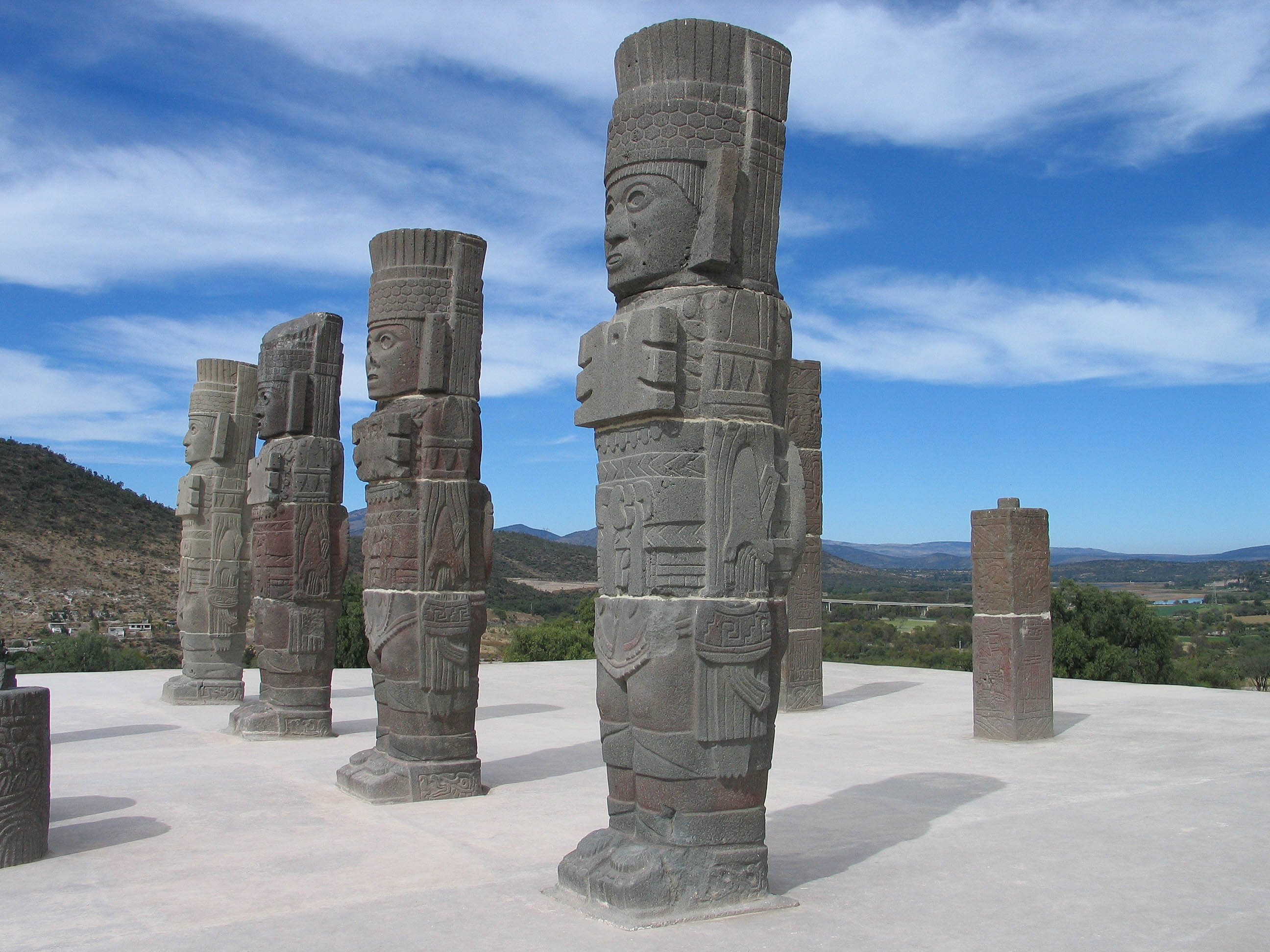
The Atlantes — columns in the form of Toltec warriors in Tula.

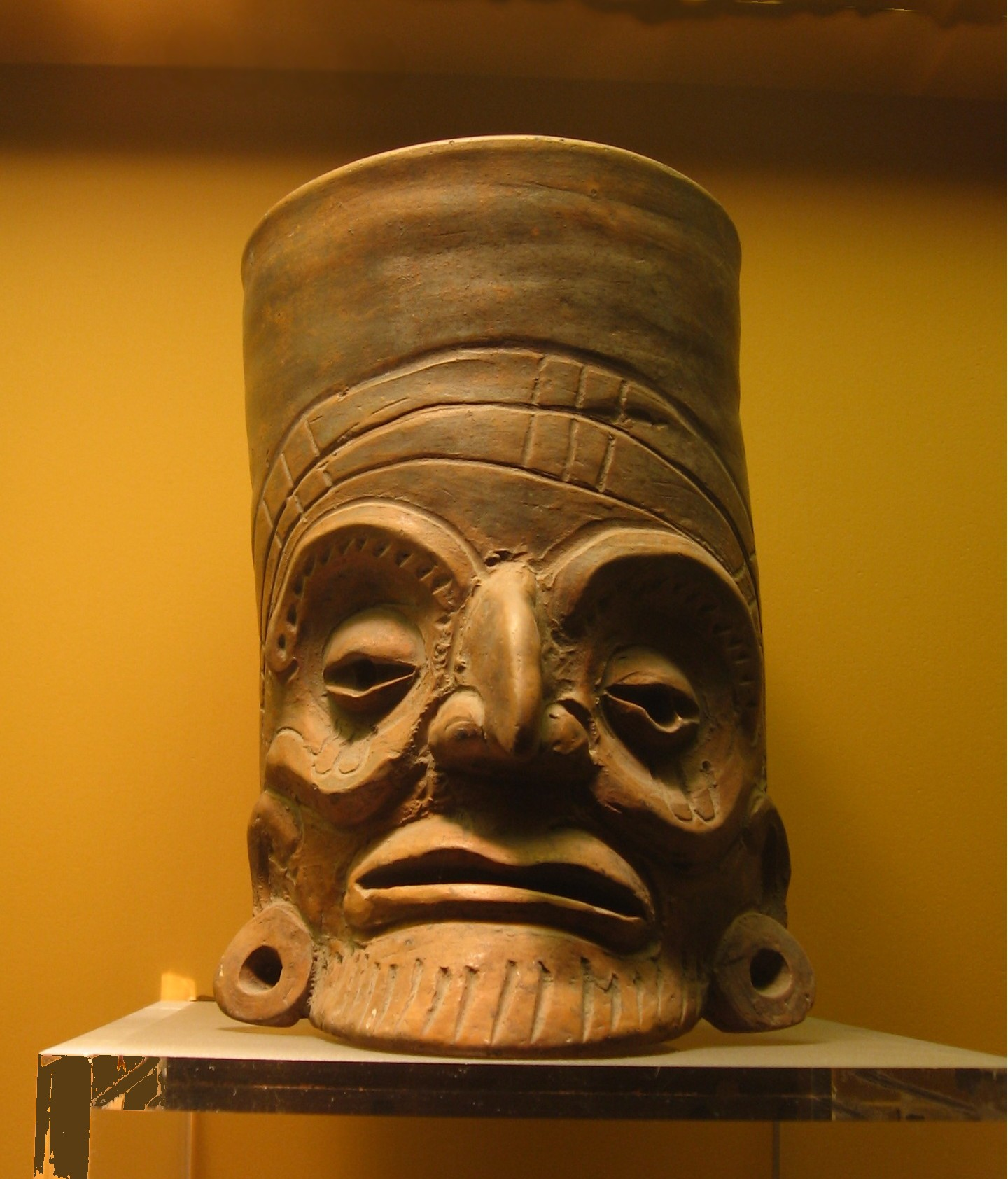
An expressive orange-ware clay vessel in the Toltec style.

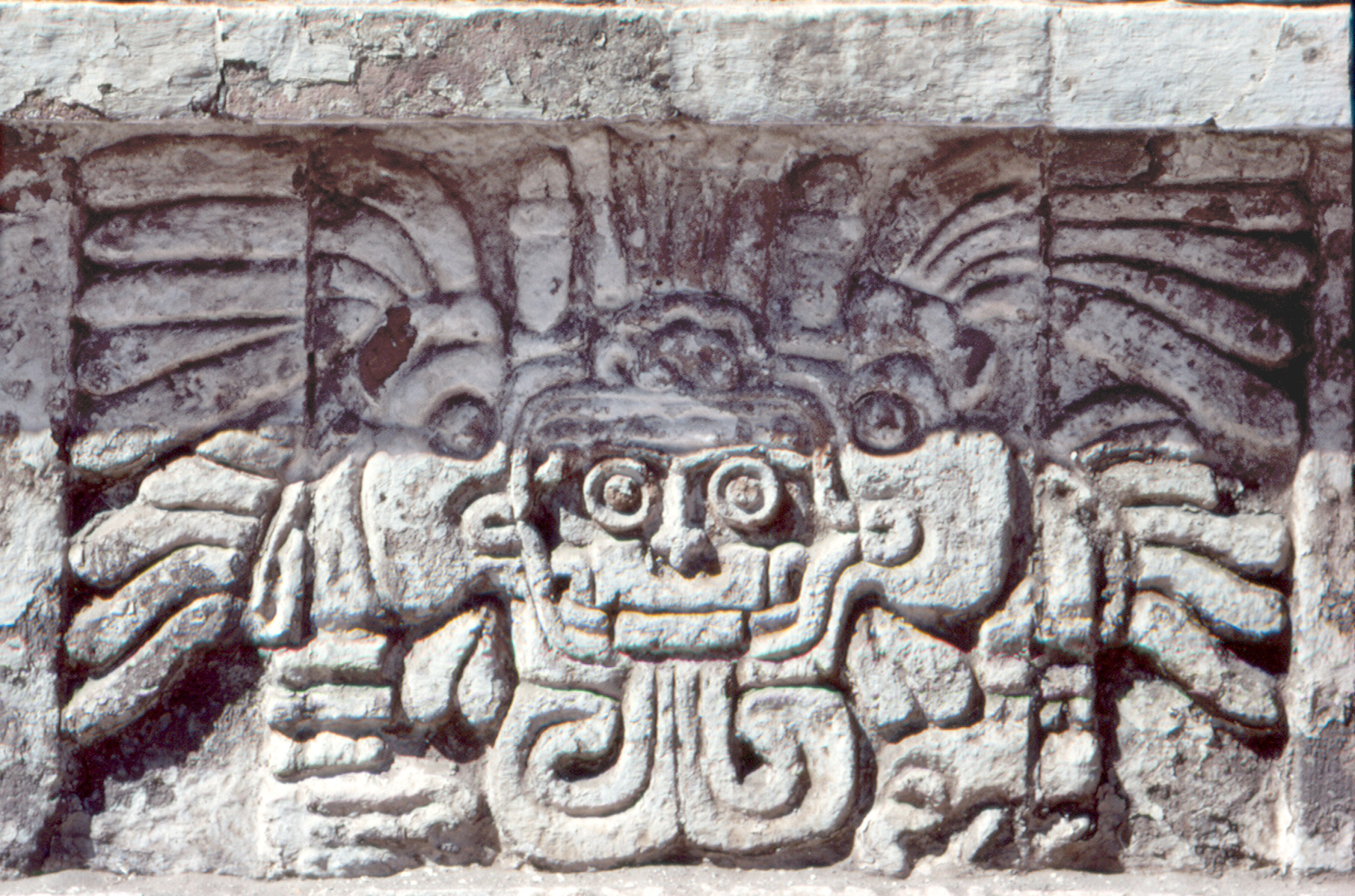
Toltec bird carving in granite at Tula

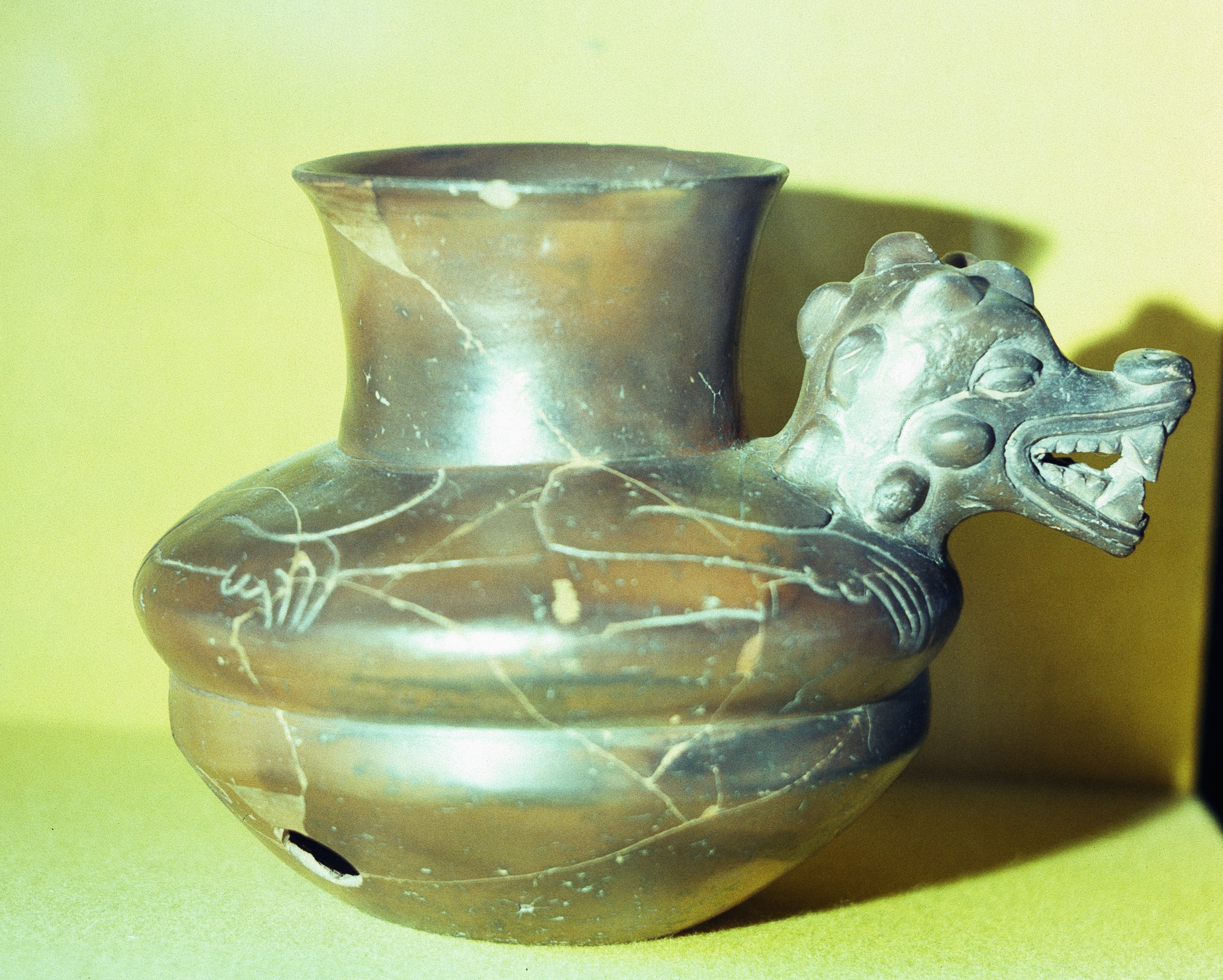
Toltec turtle vessel

==== Mixtec ====
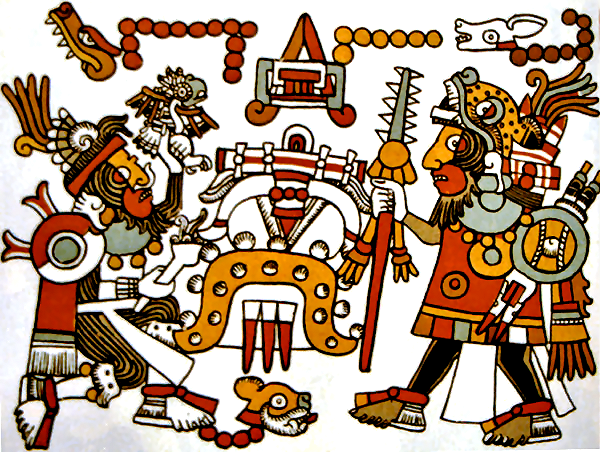
Mixtec king and warlord Eight Deer Jaguar Claw (right) meeting with Toltec ruler Lord Four Jaguar, in a depiction from the pre-Columbian Codex Zouche-Nuttall.

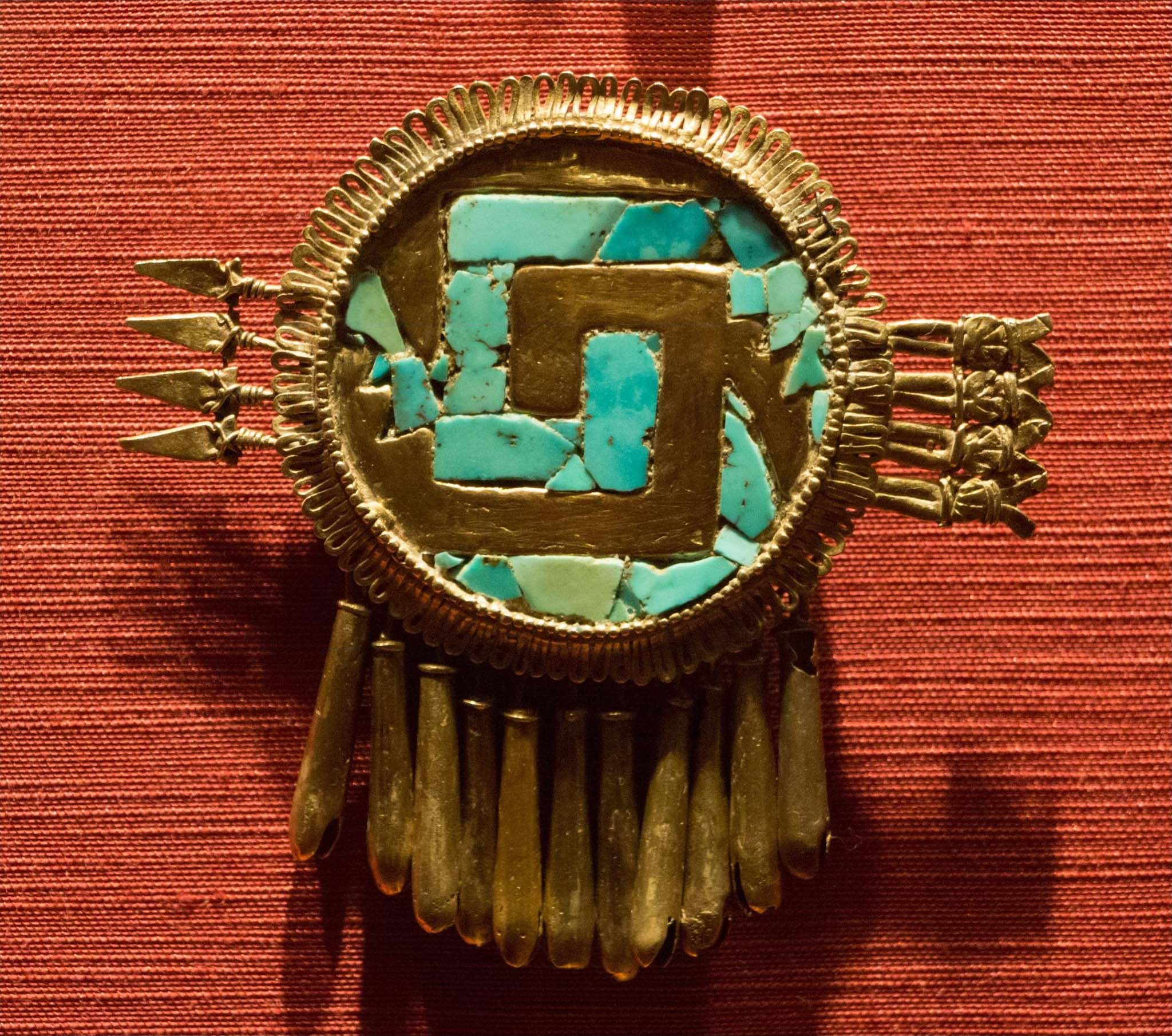
Mixtec pectoral of gold and turquoise, Shield of Yanhuitlán. National Museum of Anthropology

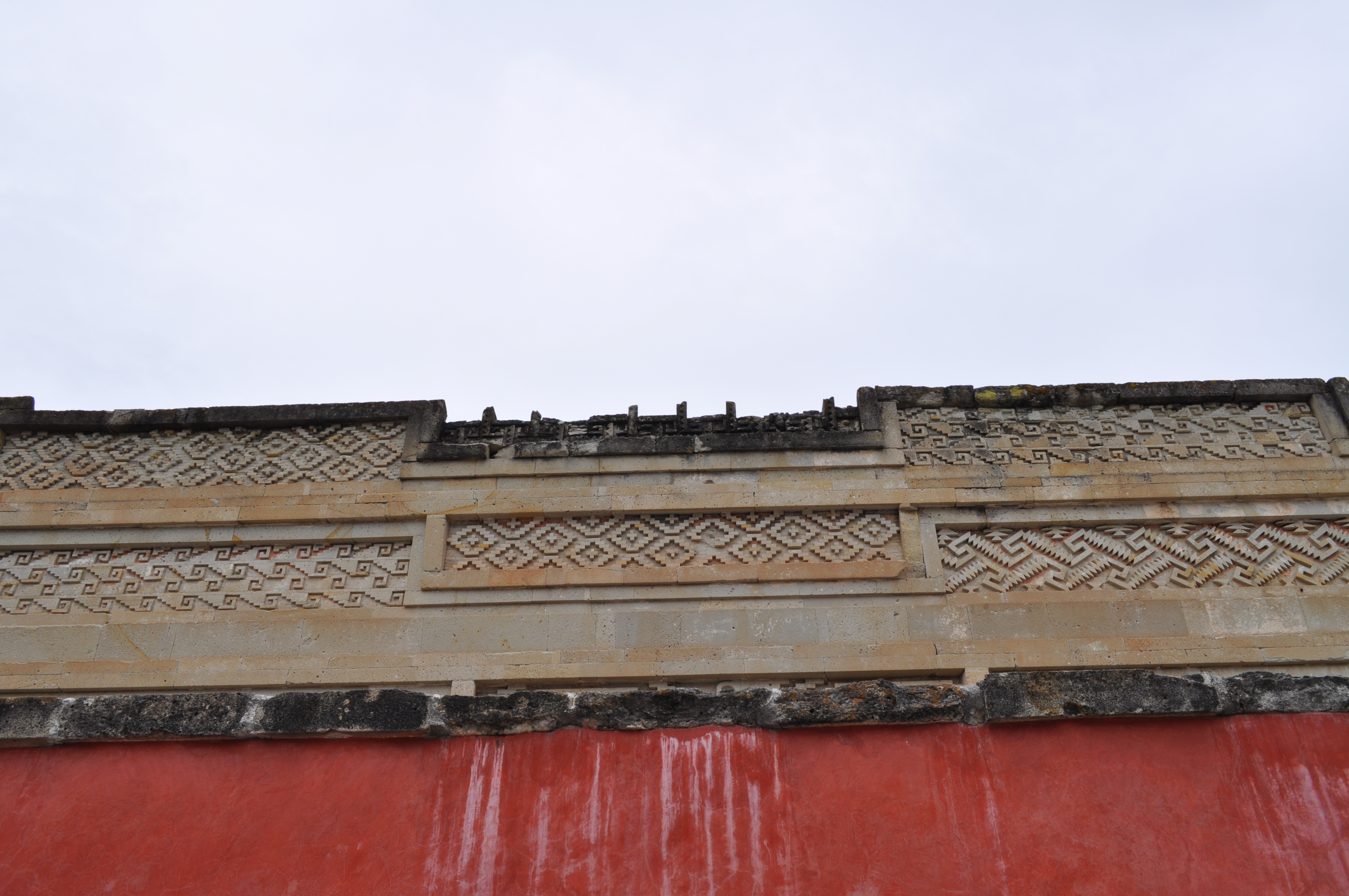
Closeup view of Mixtec stone mosaic-work at Mitla. This was an inspiration for similar mosaics by Frank Lloyd Wright.

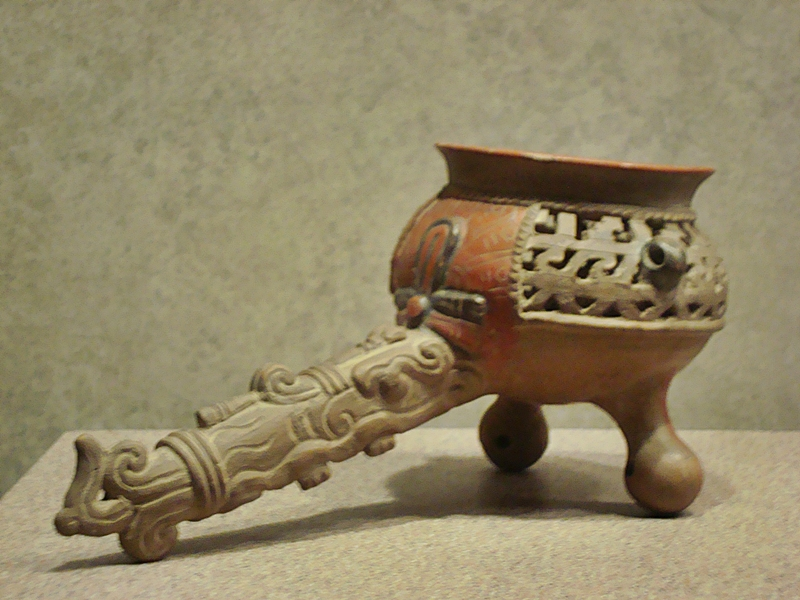
Mixtec incense burner

==== Totonac ====
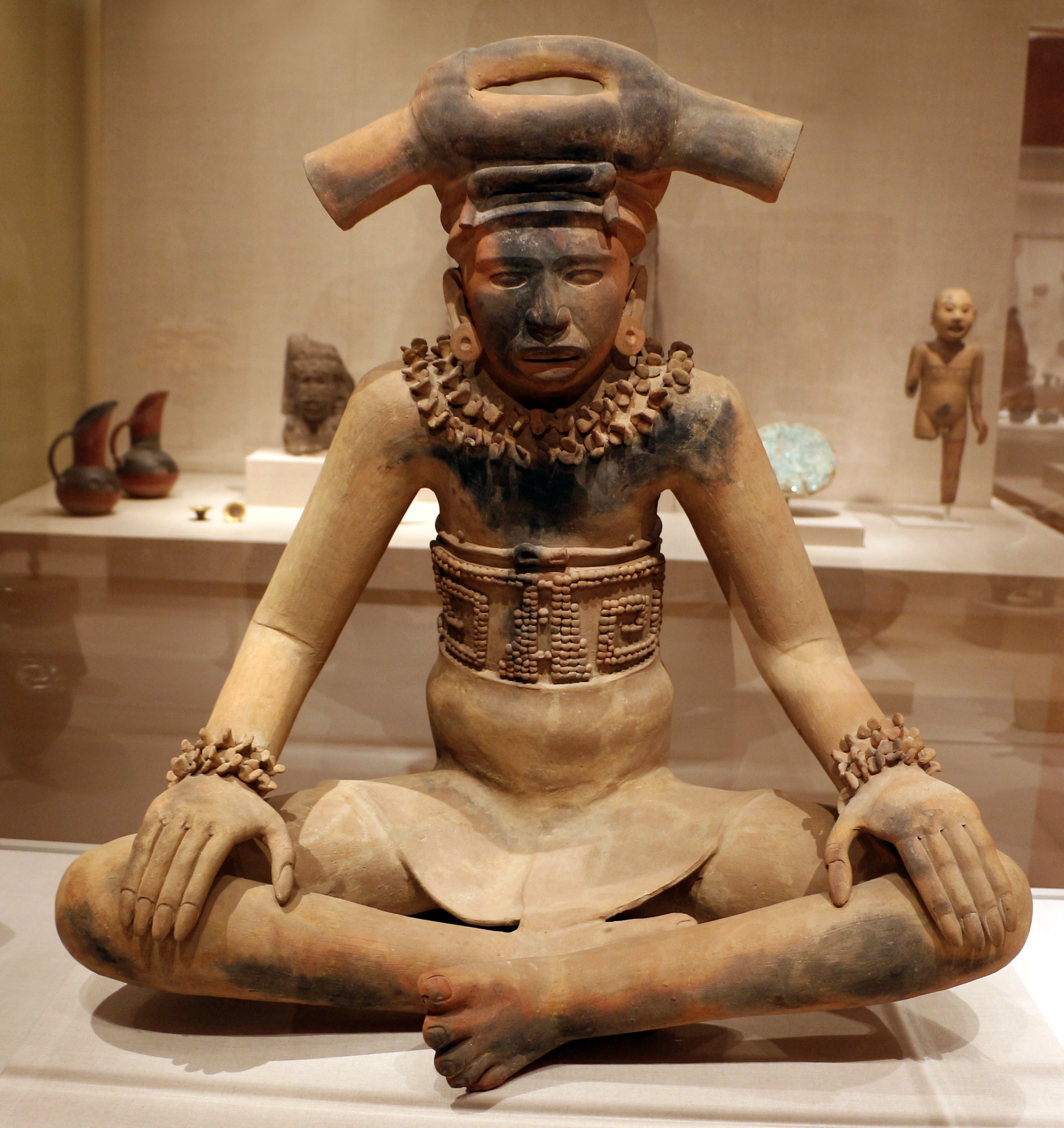
Figure of a seated commander; 300–600; Art Institute of Chicago (USA)

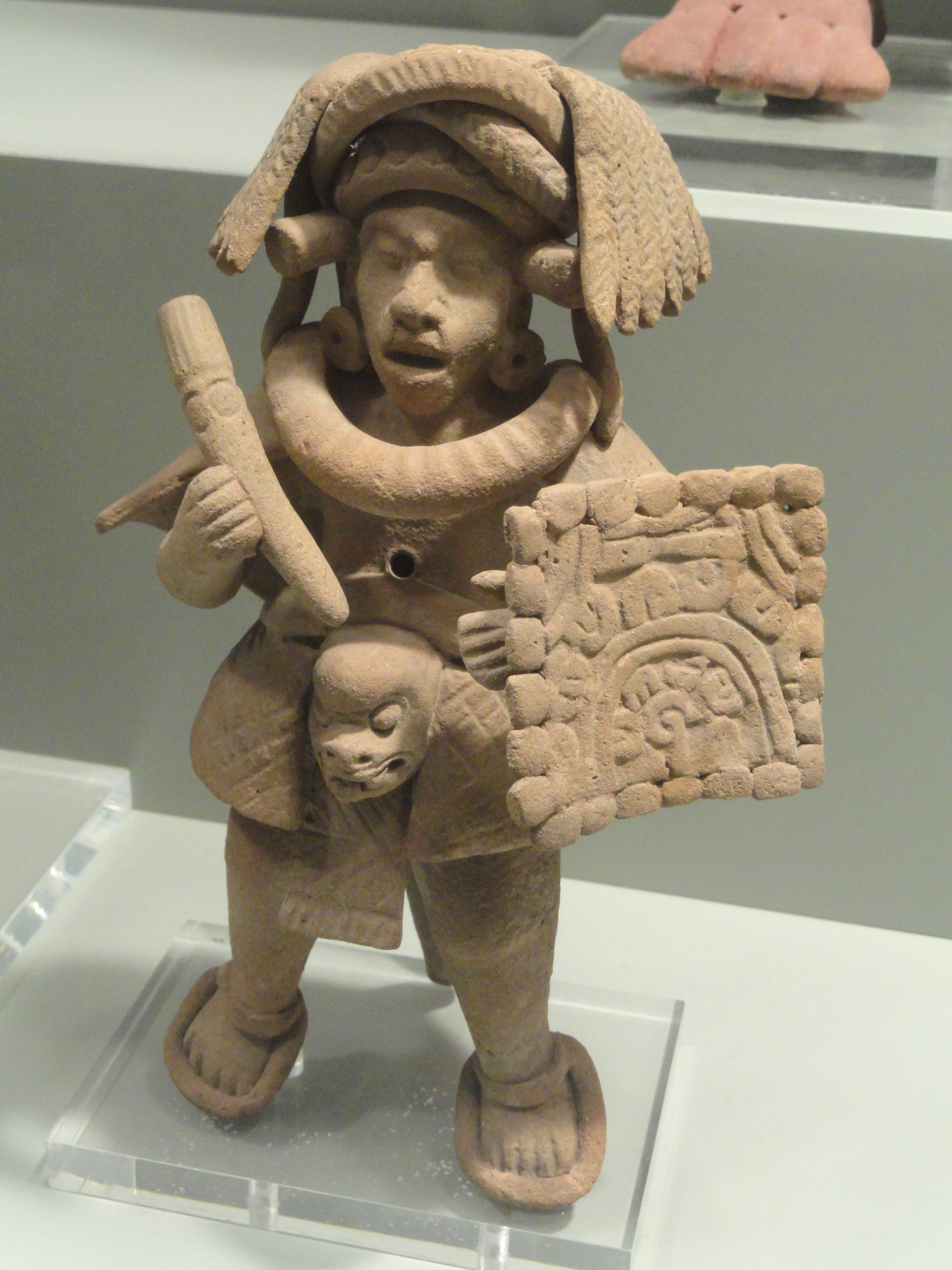
Standing male figure; 600–900; earthenware; from central Veracruz (Mexico); Gardiner Museum (Toronto, Canada)

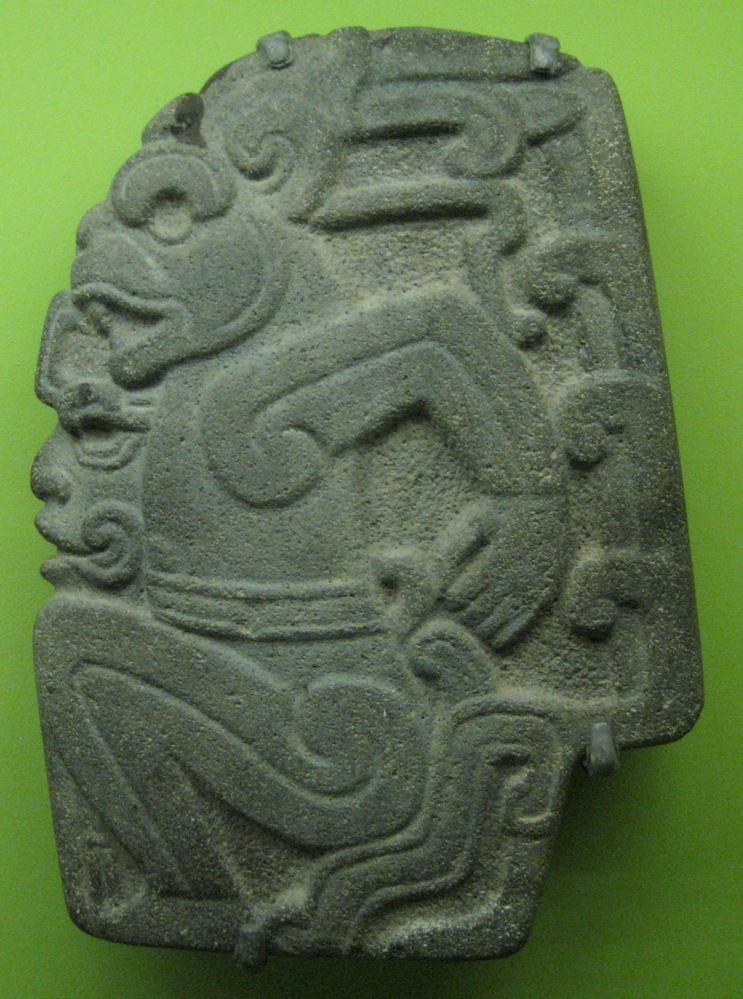
Sculpture; 700–900; andesite; height: 35.56 cm (14 in.)

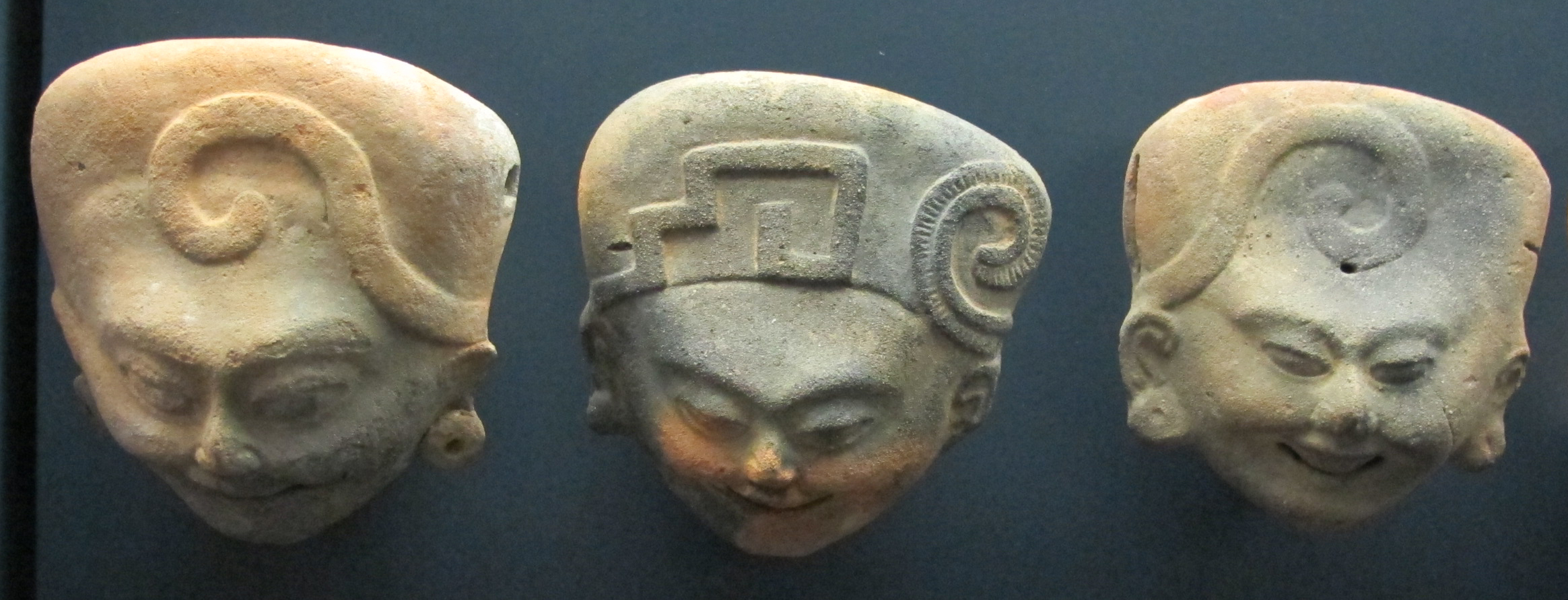
Heads; circa 900; Leipzig Museum of Ethnography (Leipzig, Germany)

==== Huastec ====
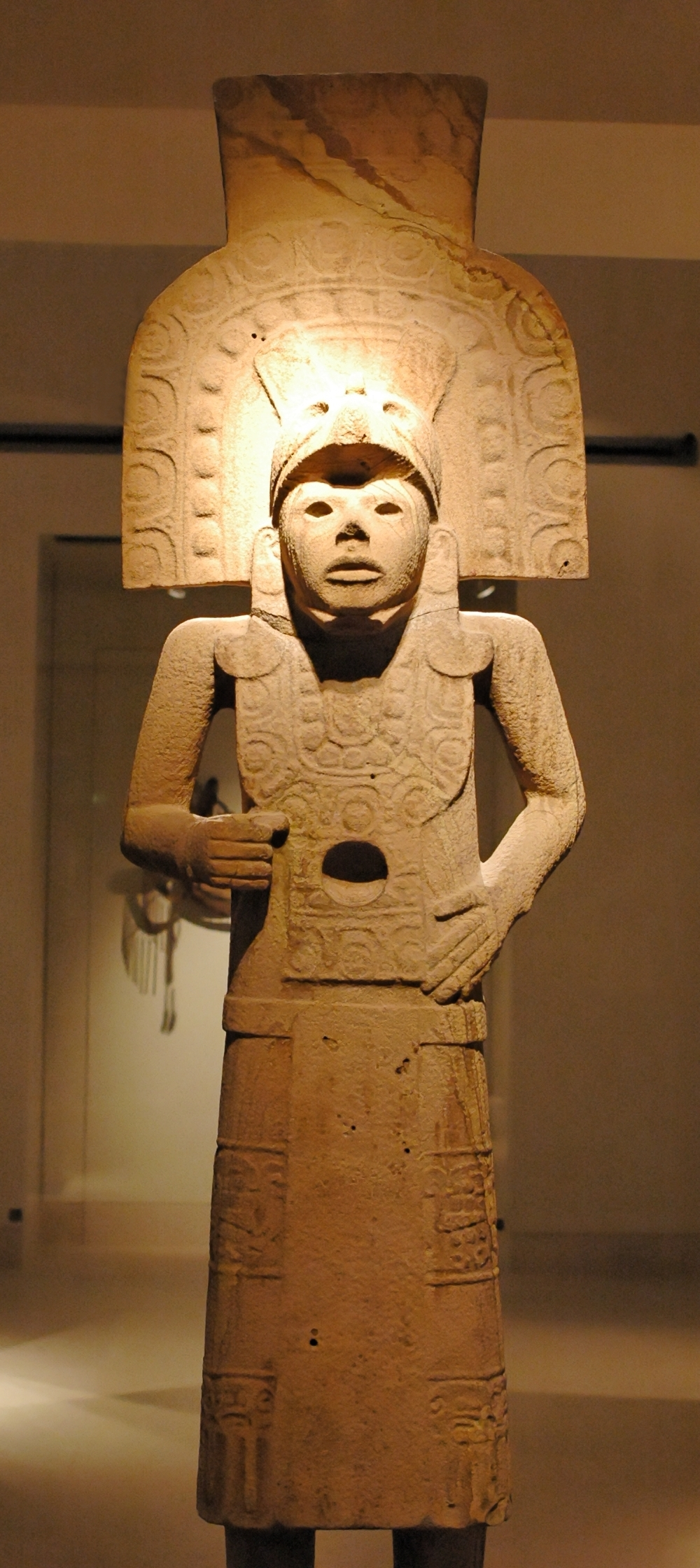

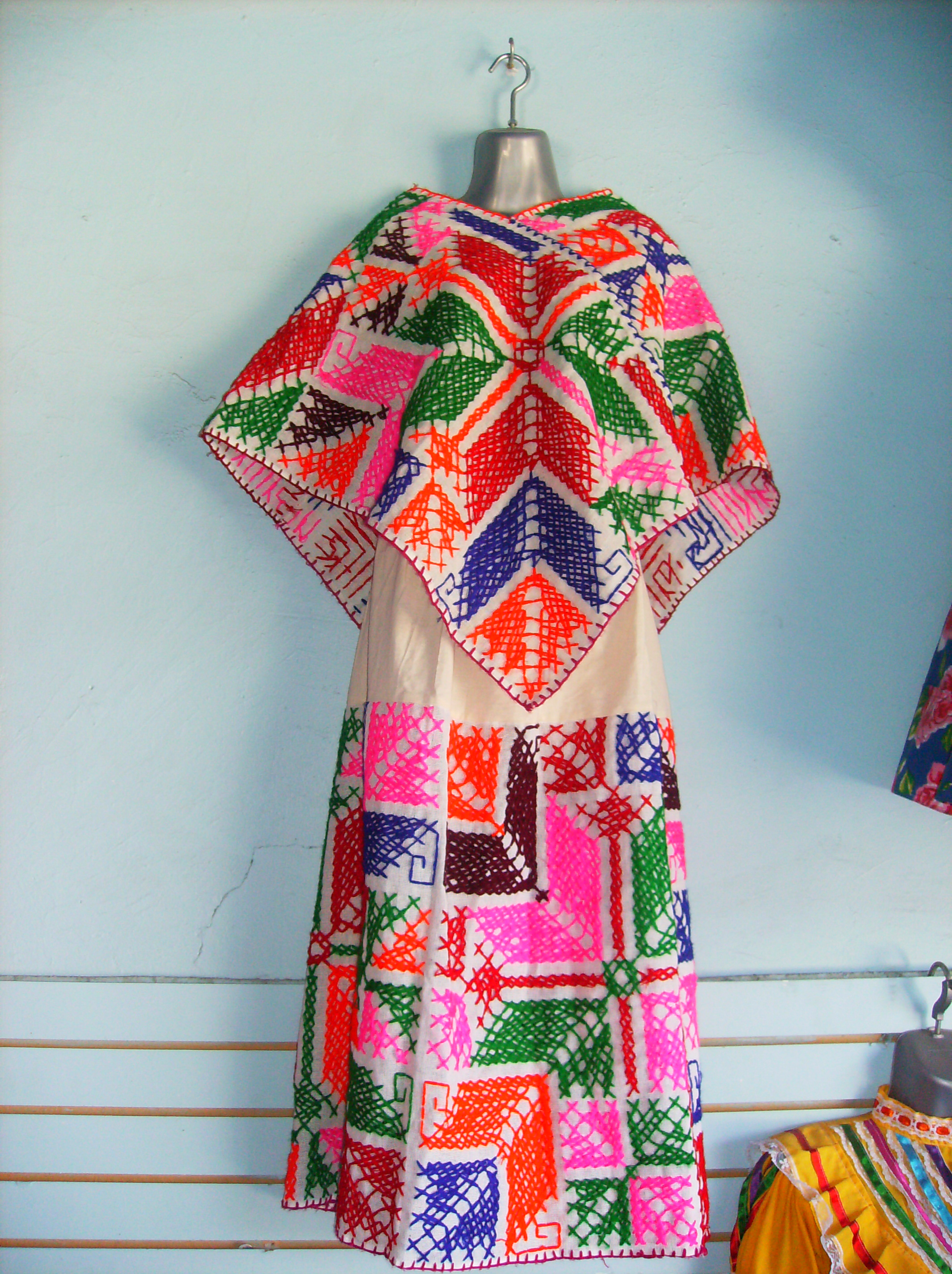

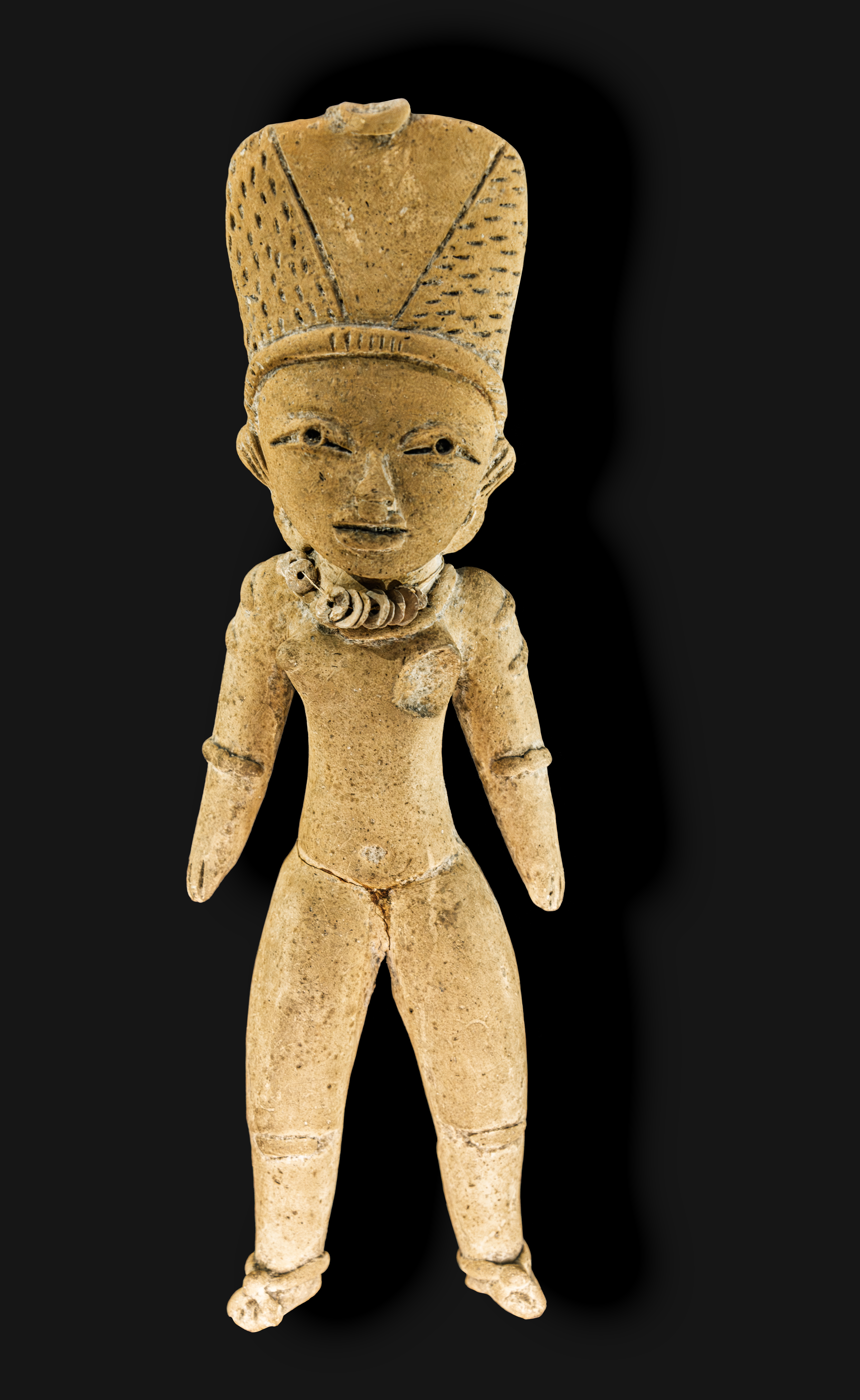

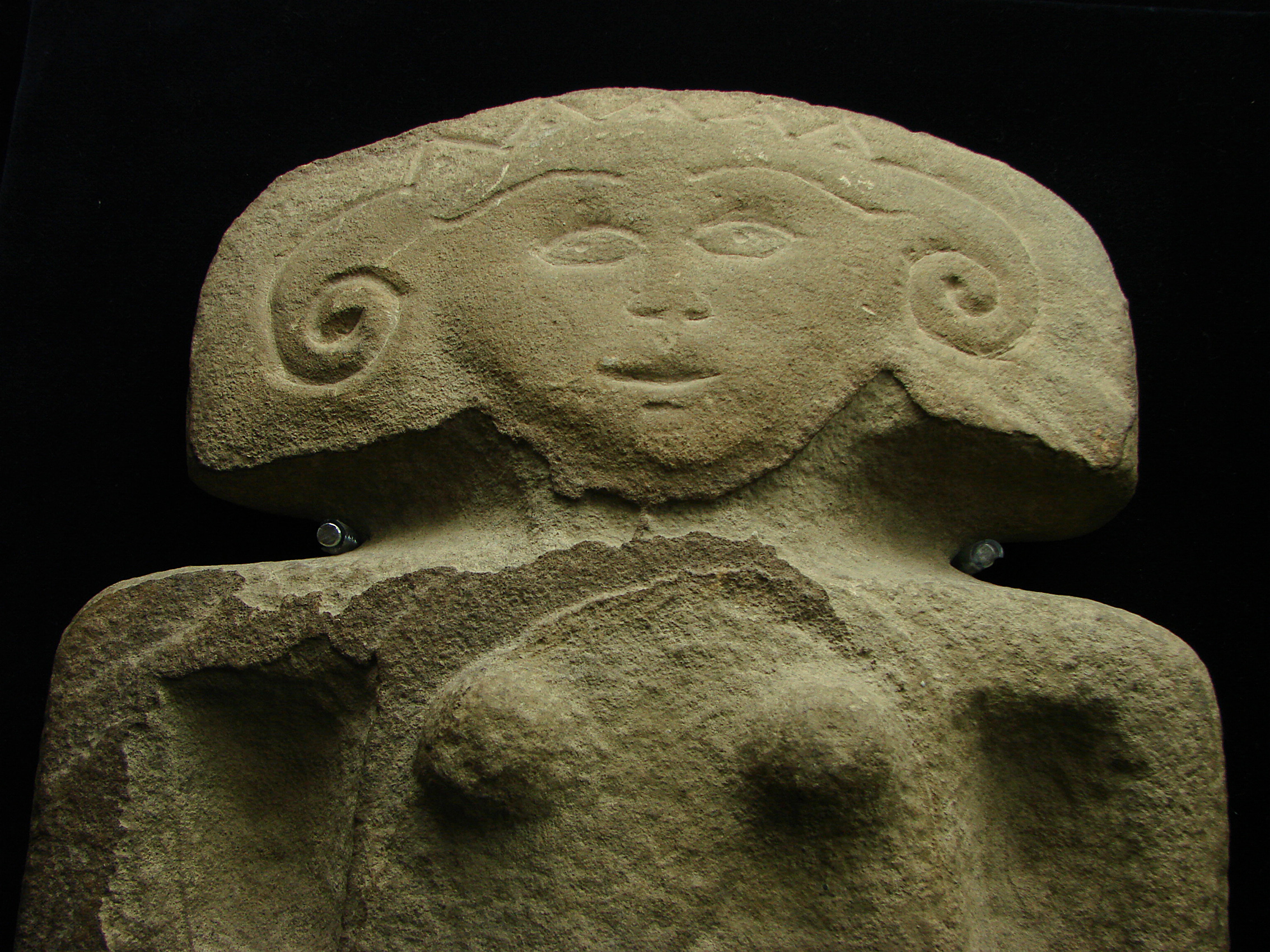

==== Aztec ====
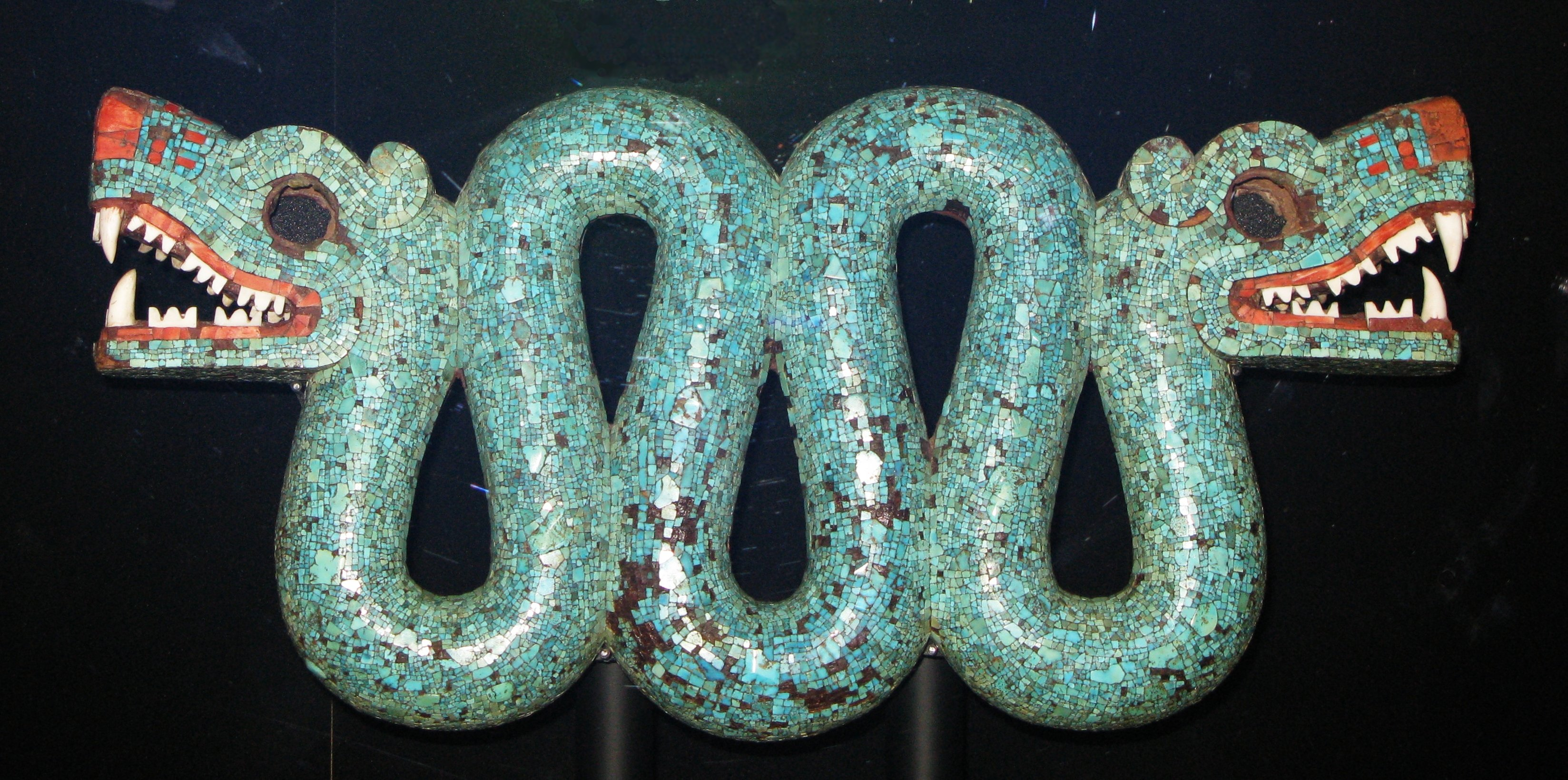
Double-headed serpent; 1450–1521; Spanish cedar wood (Cedrela odorata), turquoise, shell, traces of gilding and pine resin and Bursera resin for adhesive; 20.3 in. H; British Museum (London).

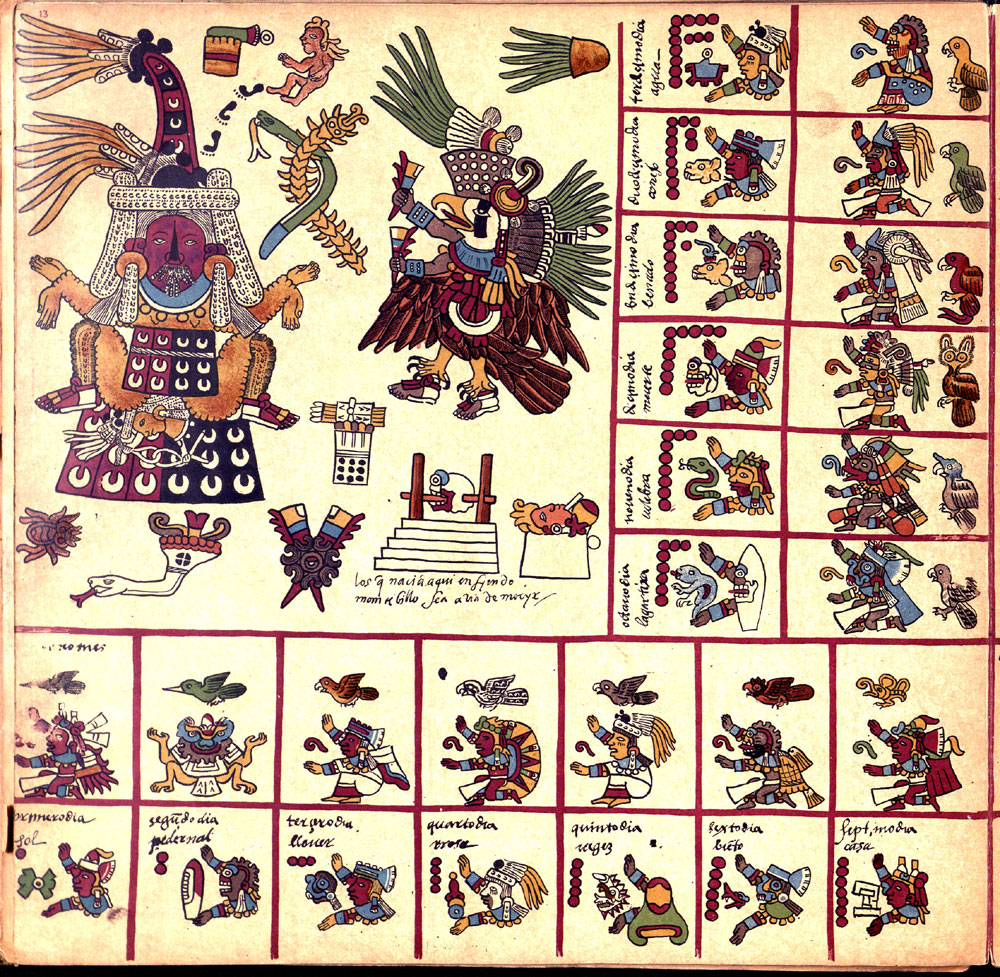
The original page 13 of the Codex Borbonicus; Bibliothèque de l'Assemblée Nationale (Paris). This 13th trecena (of the Aztec sacred calendar) was under the auspices of the goddess Tlazōlteōtl, who is shown on the upper left wearing a flayed skin, giving birth to Centeōtl. The 13-day-signs of this trecena, starting with 1 Earthquake, 2 Flint/Knife, 3 Rain, etc., are shown on the bottom row and the right column

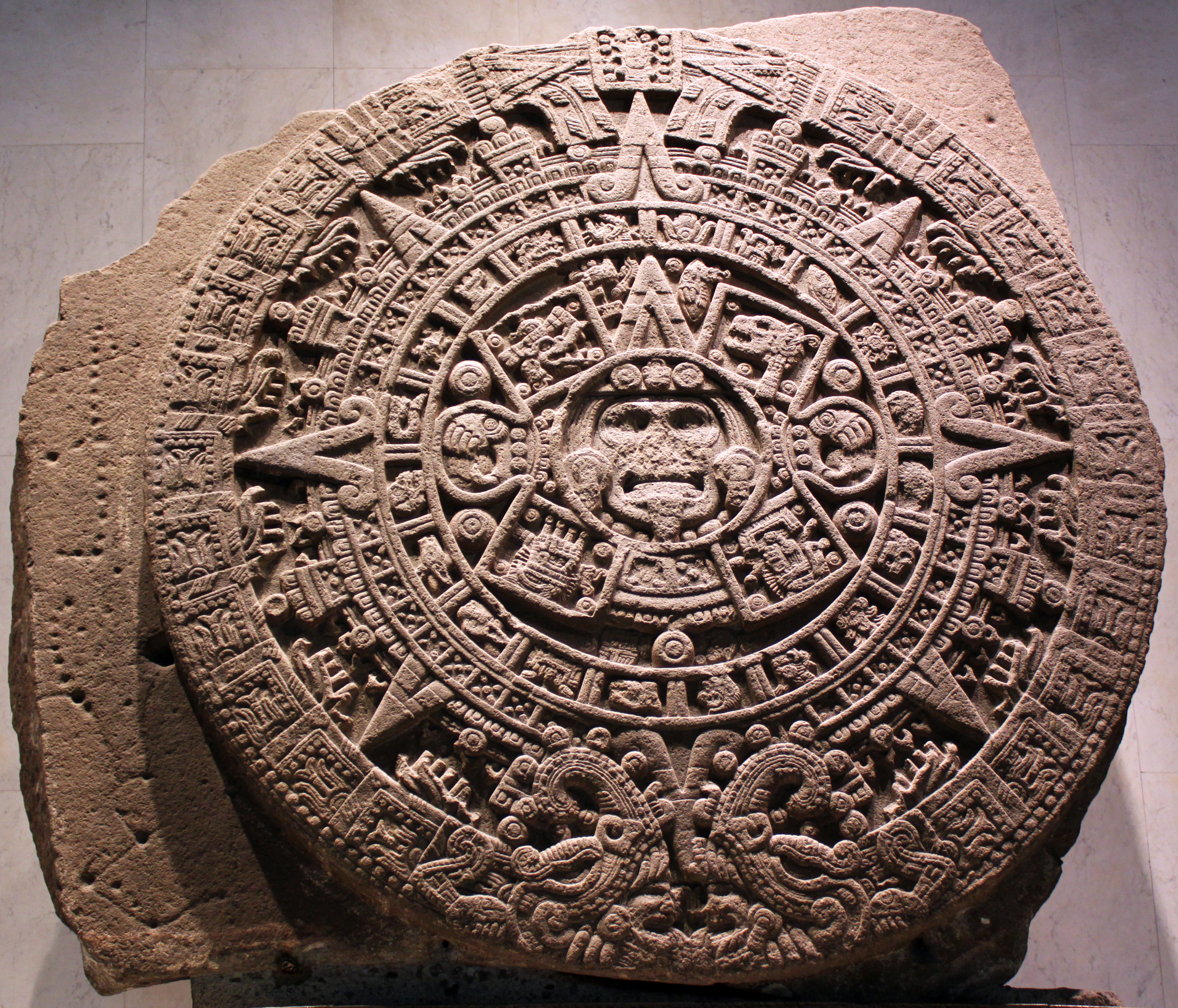
Aztec calendar stone; 1502–1521; basalt; diameter: 358 cm (141 in.); thick: 98 cm (39 in.); discovered on 17 December 1790 during repairs on the Mexico City Cathedral; National Museum of Anthropology (Mexico City). The exact purpose and meaning of the Calendar Stone are unclear. Archaeologists and historians have proposed numerous theories, and it is likely that there are several aspects to its interpretation

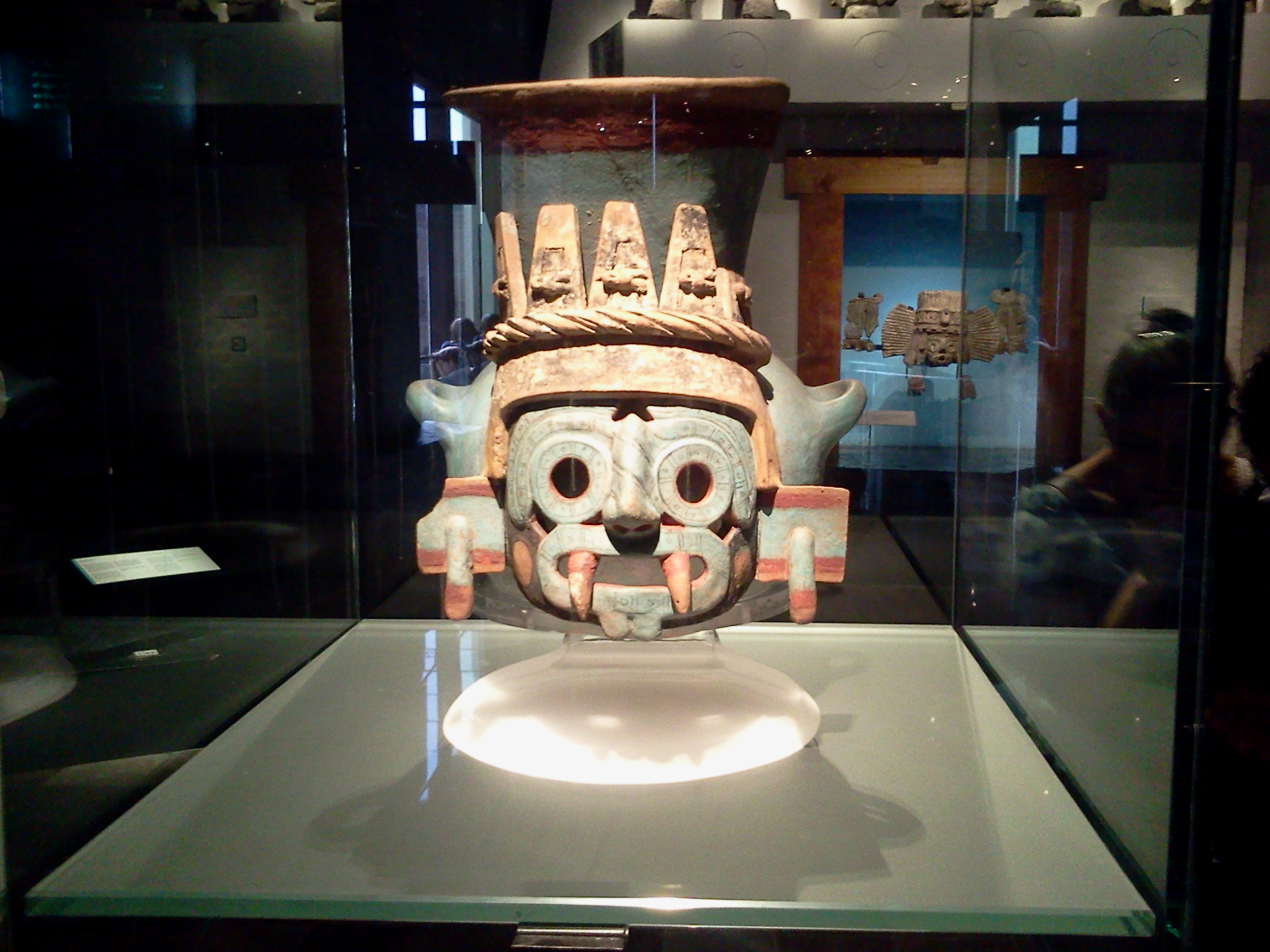
Tlāloc effigy vessel; 1440–1469; painted earthenware; height: 35 cm (1 3/4 in.); Museo del Templo Mayor (Mexico City). Templo Mayor, dedicated to Tlāloc. This jar, covered with stucco and painted blue, is adorned with the visage of Tlāloc, identified by his coloration, ringed teeth and jaguar teeth

=== Central America and "Intermediate area" ===
Greater Chiriqui

Greater Nicoya The ancient peoples of the Nicoya Peninsula in present-day Costa Rica traditionally sculpted birds in jade, which were used for funeral ornaments. Around 500 CE gold ornaments replaced jade, possibly because of the depletion of jade resources.

=== Caribbean ===
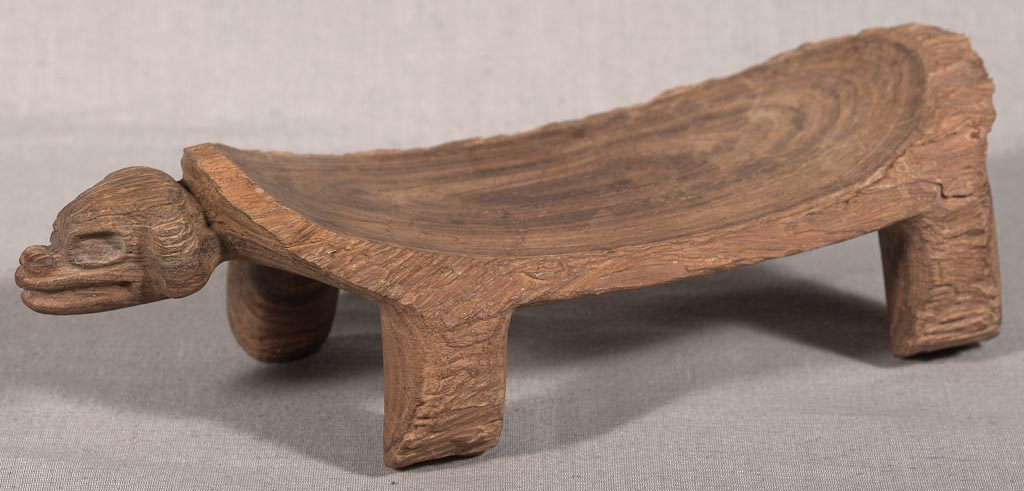
Duho (Ceremonial wooden stool), Hispaniola. Taíno, 1000-1500 CE, carved lignum vitae

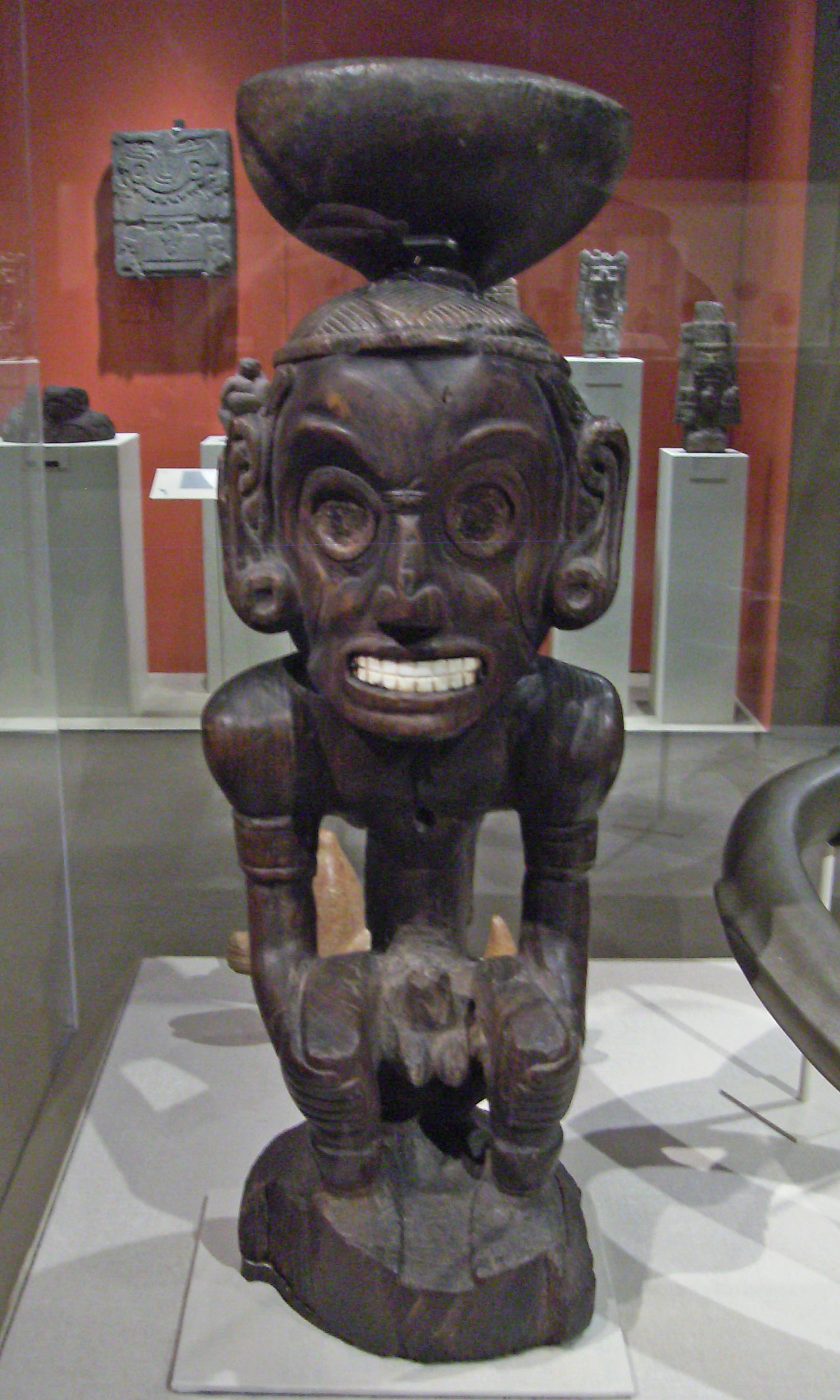
Taíno zemi, ironwood with shell inlay, Dominican Republic, 15th-16th-century bowl used for cohoba rituals

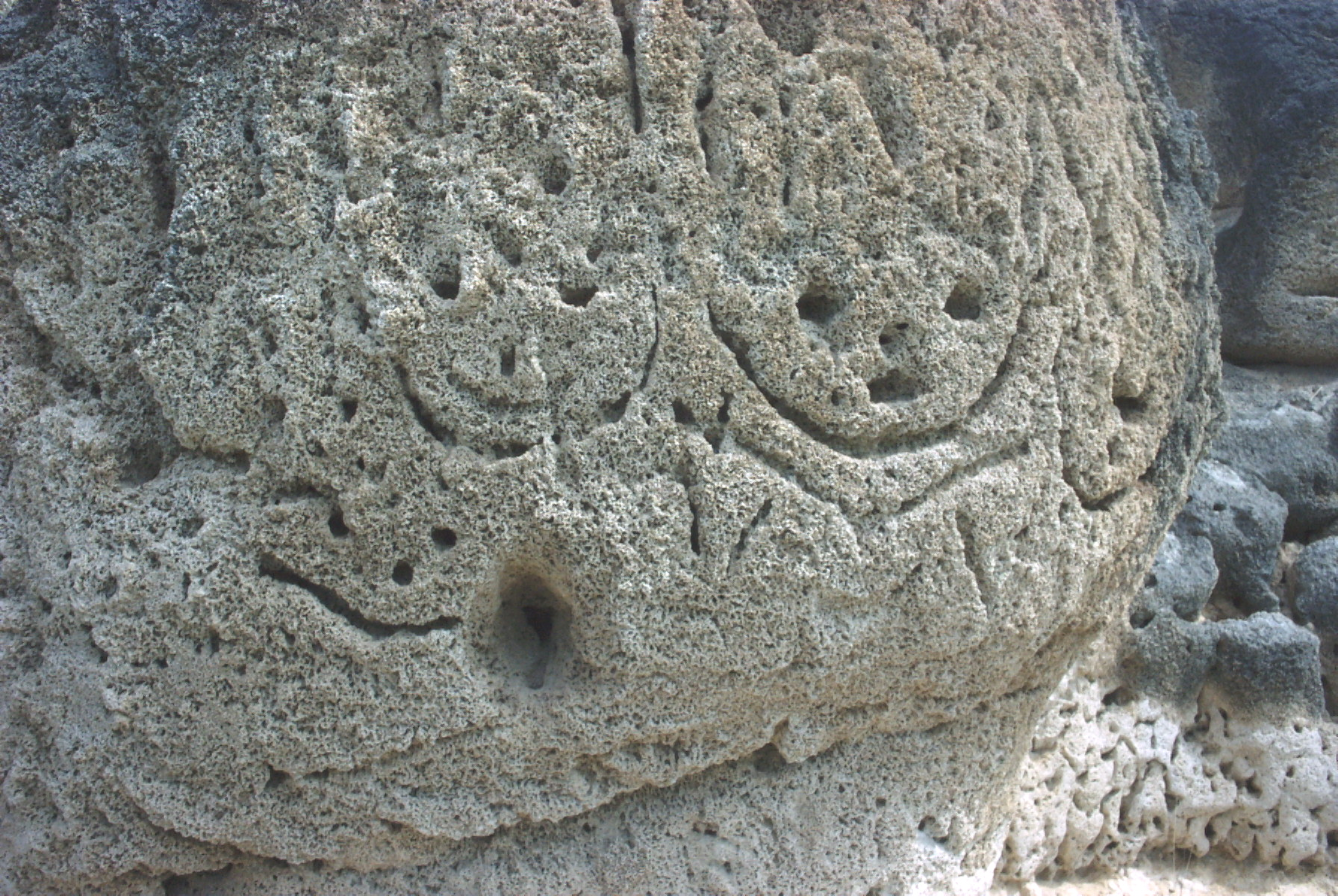
Las Caritas, Taíno petroglyphs, Lake Enriquillo, Dominican Republic

Taíno batey ball court petroglyph, Caguana, Utuado, Puerto Rico

== South American ==
The native civilizations were most developed in the Andean region, where they are roughly divided into Northern Andes civilizations of present- day Colombia and Ecuador and the Southern Andes civilizations of present- day Peru and Chile.

Hunter-gatherer tribes throughout the Amazon rainforest of Brazil also have developed artistic traditions involving tattooing and body painting. Because of their remoteness, these tribes and their art have not been studied as thoroughly as Andean cultures, and many even remain uncontacted.

=== Isthmo-Colombian Area ===
The Isthmo-Colombian Area includes some Central American countries (like Costa Rica and Panama) and some South American countries near them (like Colombia).

==== San Agustín ====
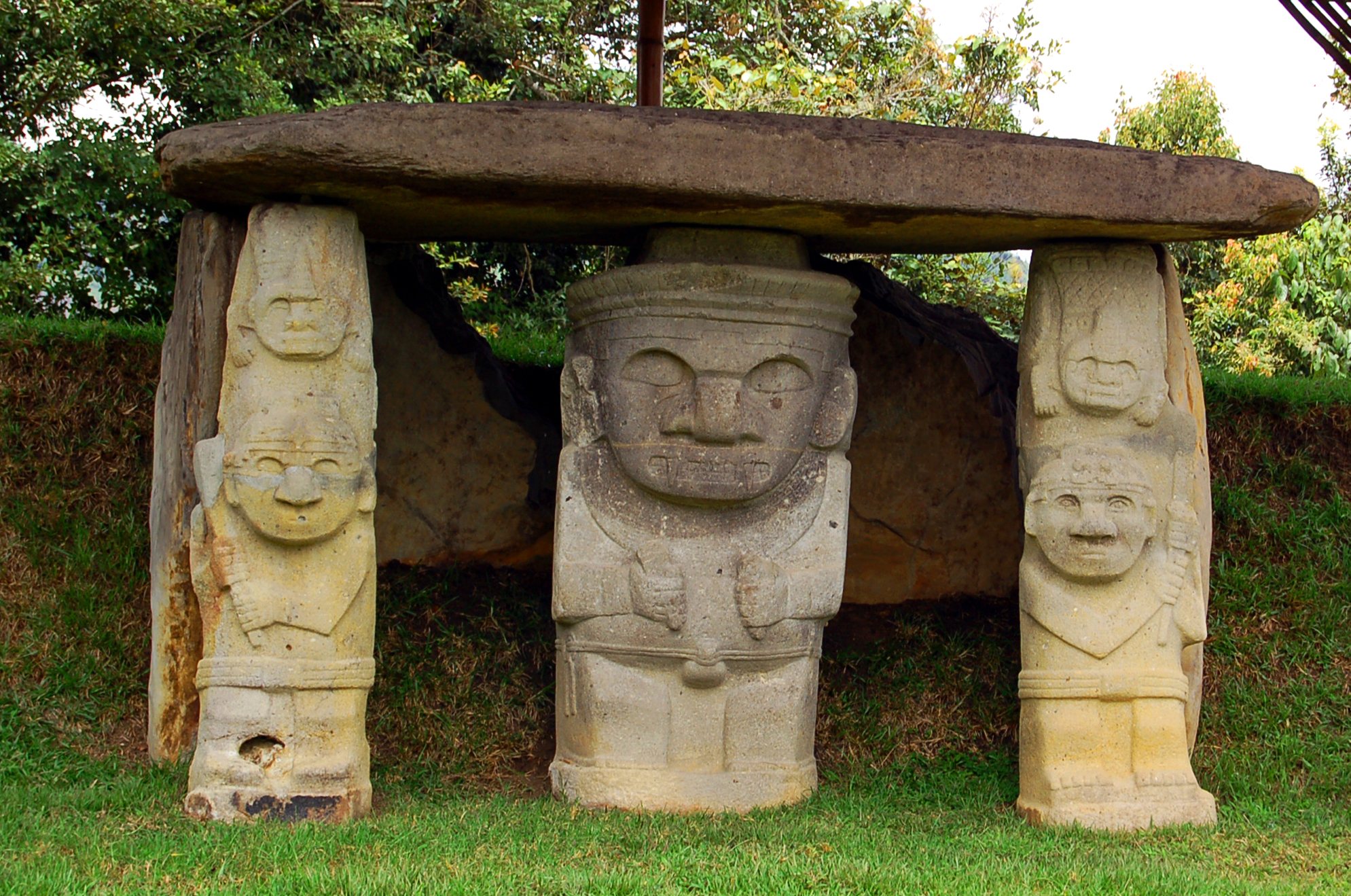
Zoomorphico-anthropomorphic figures from San Agustín Archaeological Park

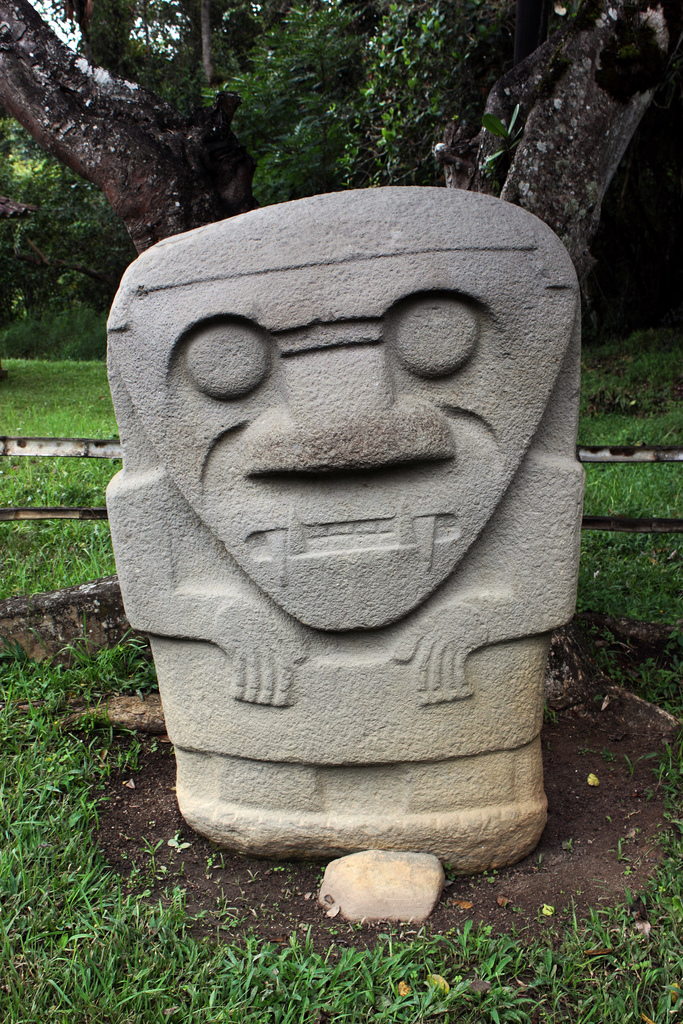
Figure from San Agustín Archaeological Park

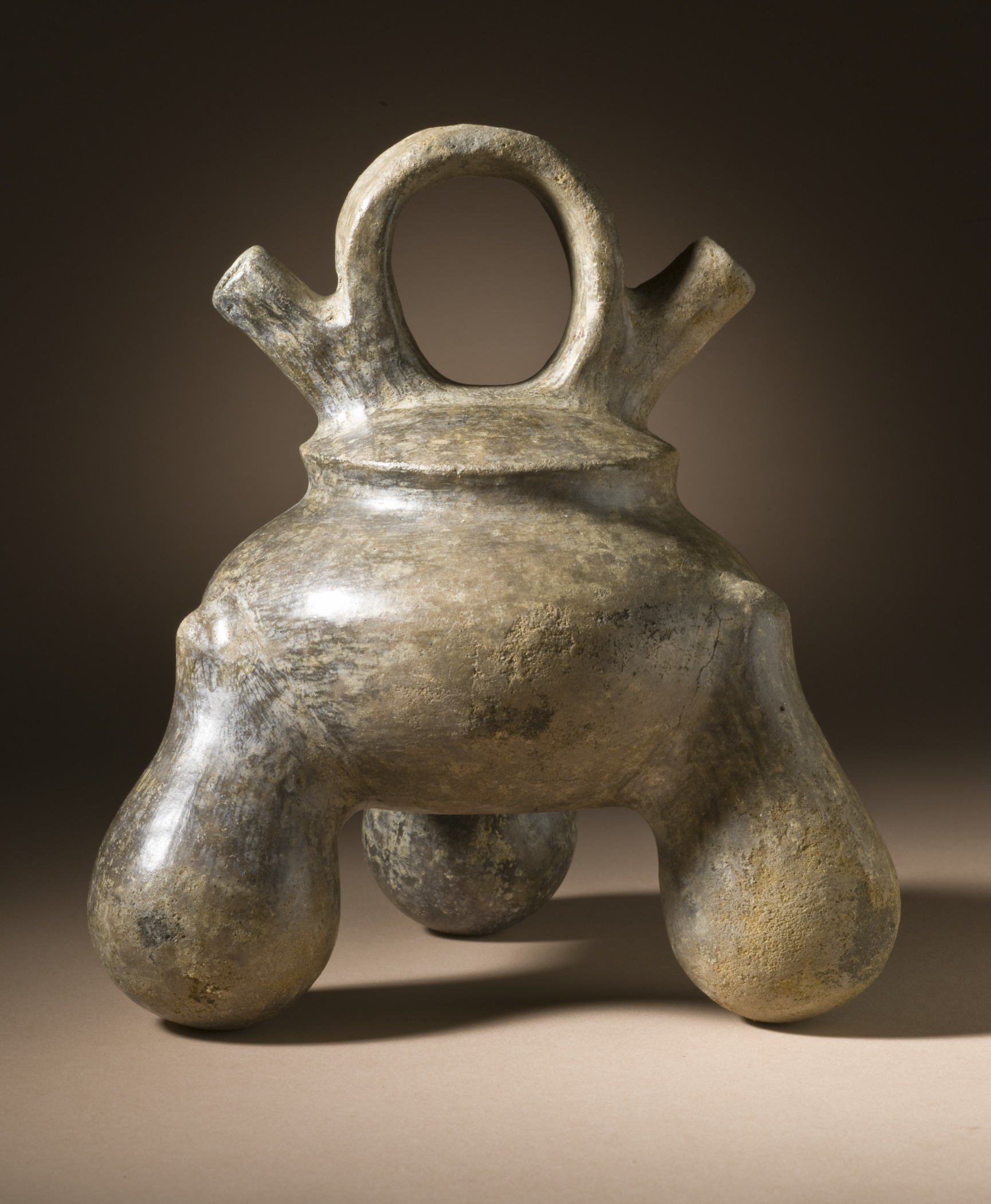
Double-spouted jar with strap handle; 500 BCE-500 CE; slip-painted ceramic; height: 21.27 cm (8 3/8 in.), width: 19.05 cm (7 1/2 in.), depth: 17.46 cm (6 7/8 in.); Los Angeles County Museum of Art (USA)

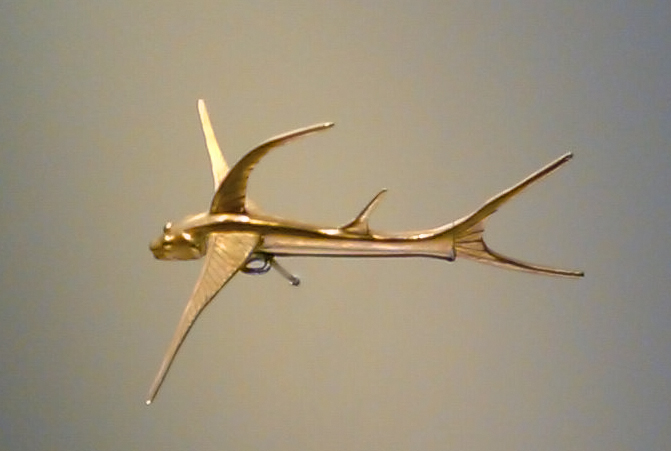
Pendant; 1 CE-900; gold; 3.1 x 9.7 x 8.8 cm; Gold Museum (Bogotá, Colombia)

==== Calima ====
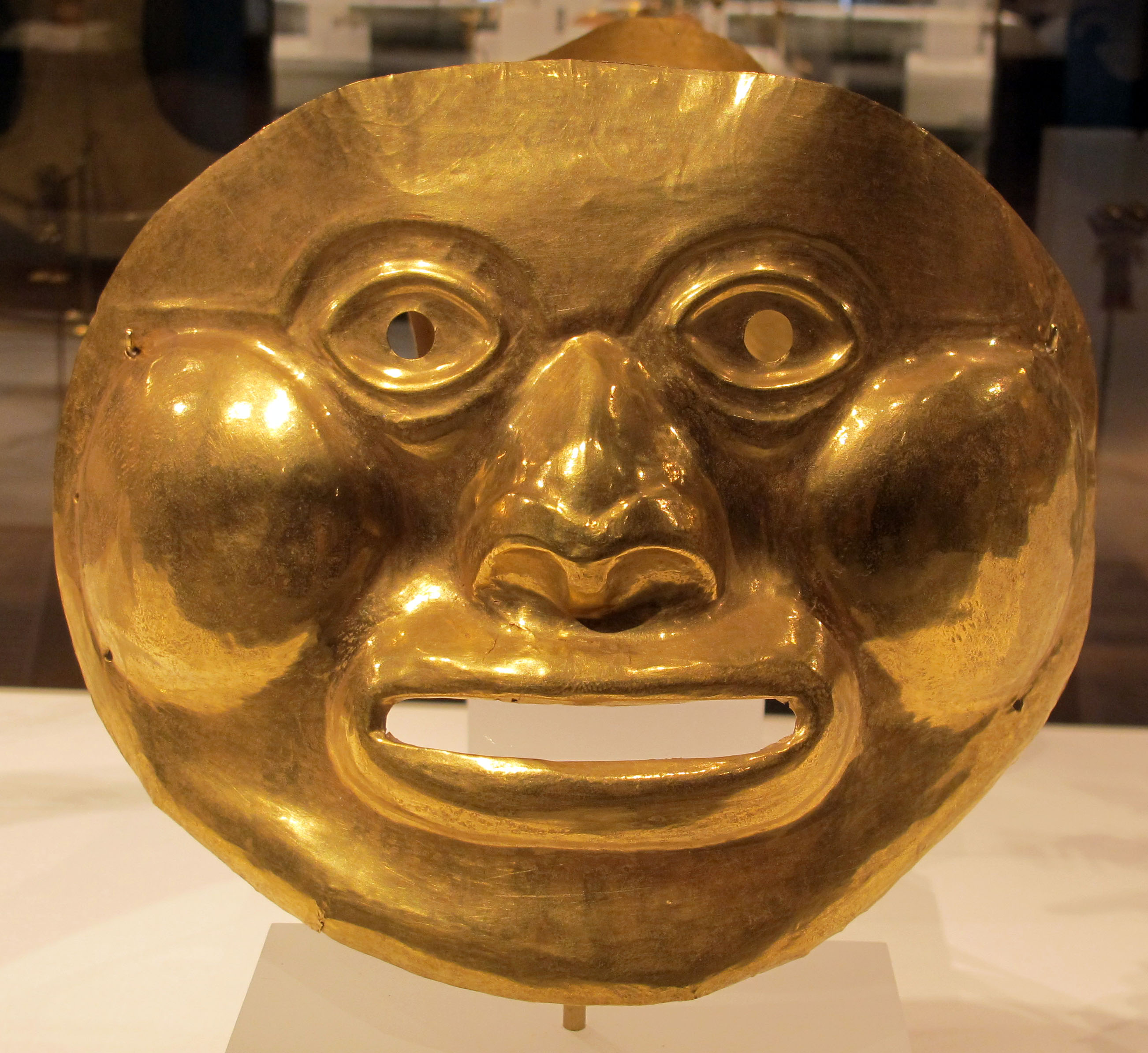
Funerary mask; 5th-1st century BCE; embossed gold; Ilama stage; Metropolitan Museum of Art

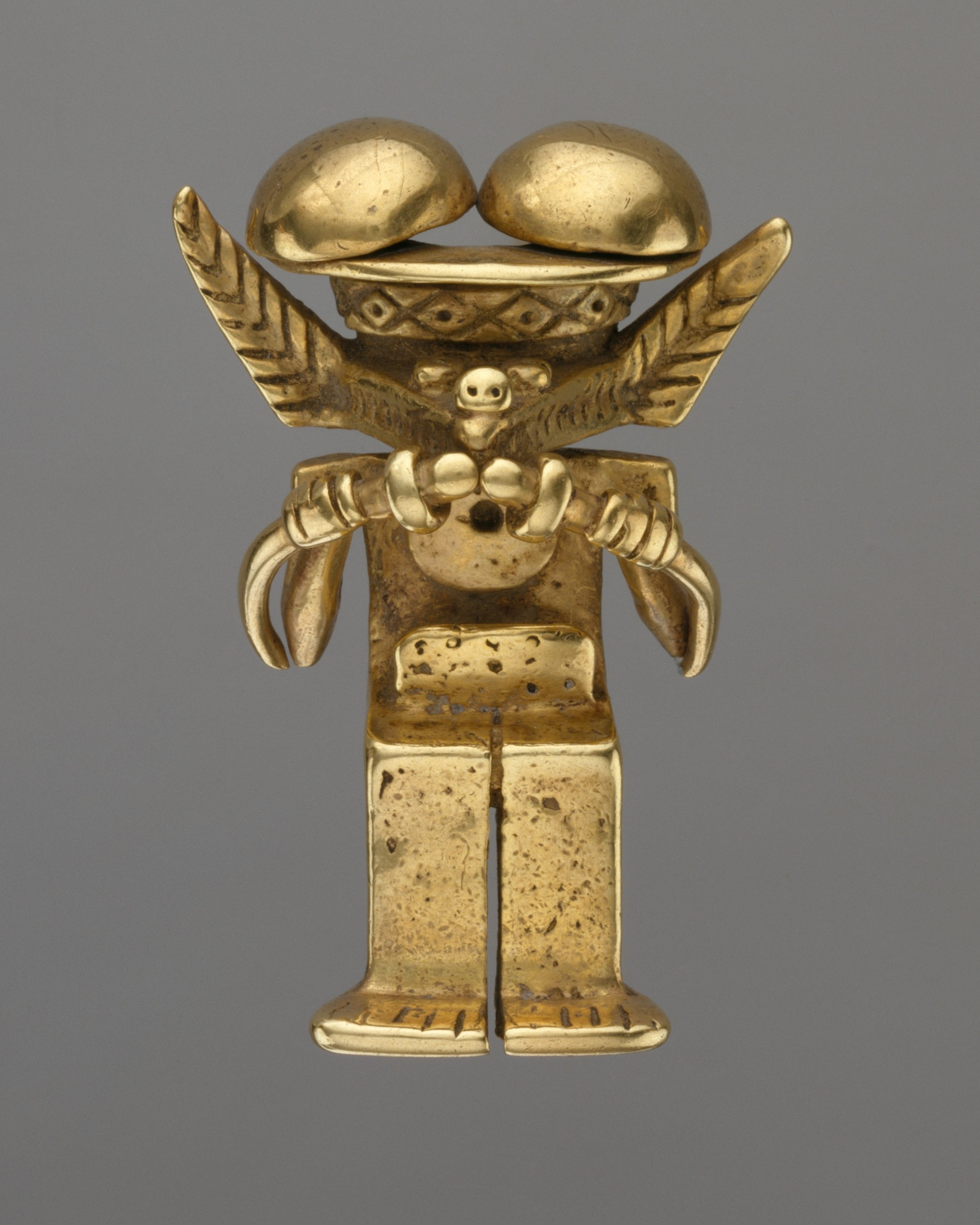
Animal-headed figure pendant; 1st–7th century; gold; height: 6.35 cm (2 1/2 in.); Yotoco stage; Metropolitan Museum of Art (New York City)

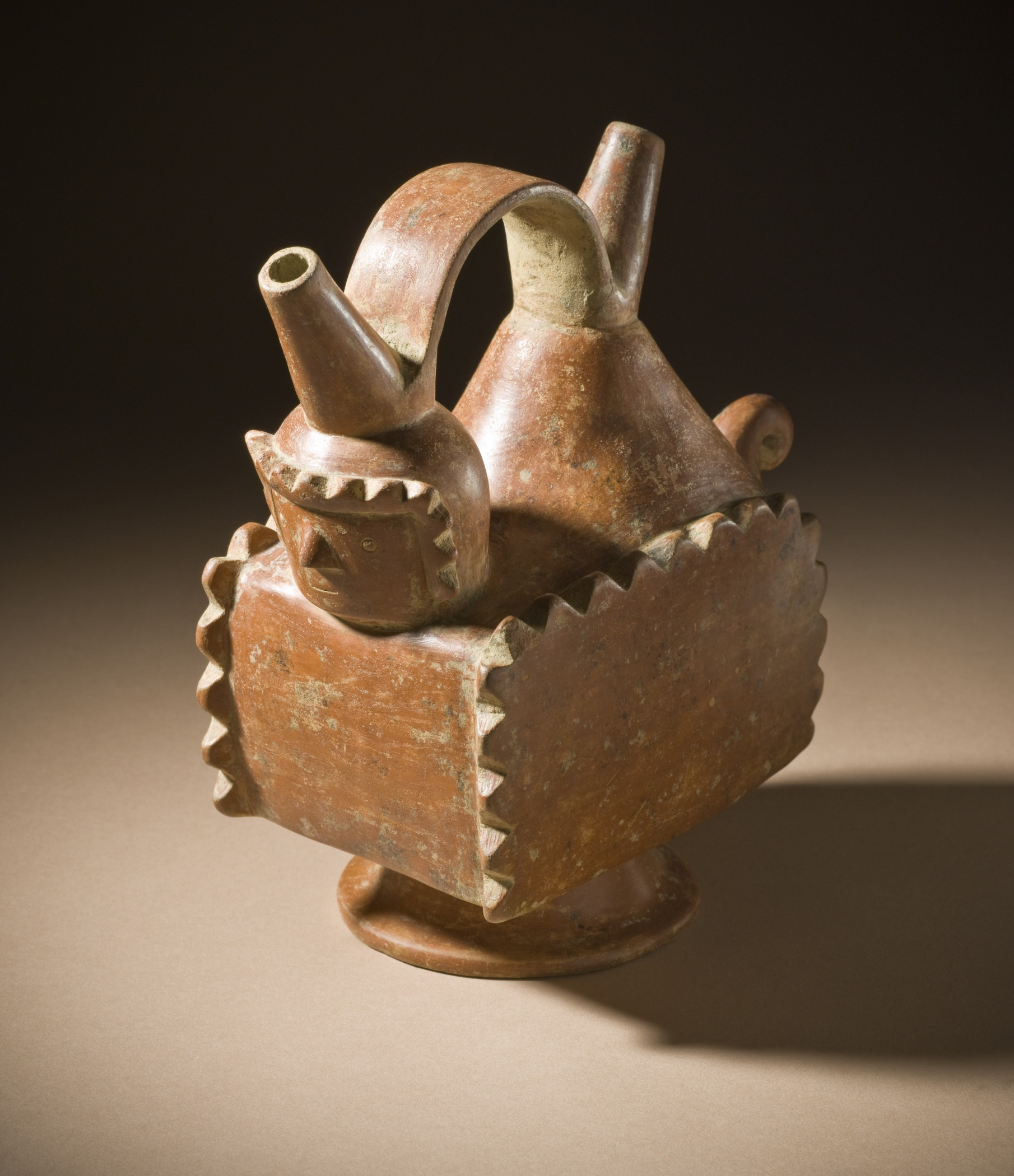
Double spout and strap handle vessel with a mythological figure; 400–1200; slip-painted ceramic; height: 19.37 cm (7 5/8 in.), width: 19.05 cm (7 1/2 in.), depth: 10.32 cm (4 1/16in.); Yotoco stage; Los Angeles County Museum of Art

==== Tolima ====
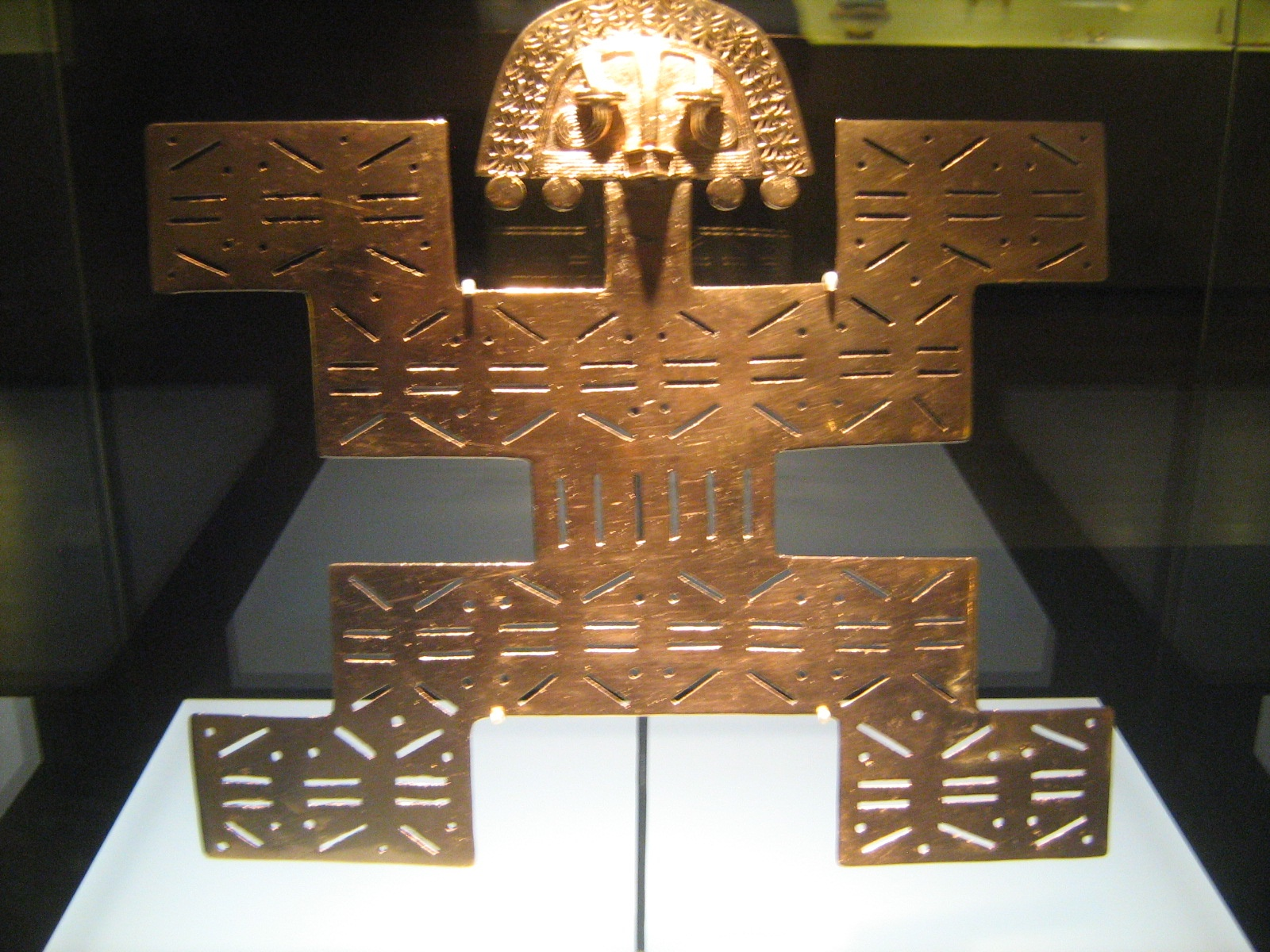
Pectoral; 1 CE-550; tumbaga; 23.4 x 25.7 cm; Gold Museum (Bogotá, Colombia)

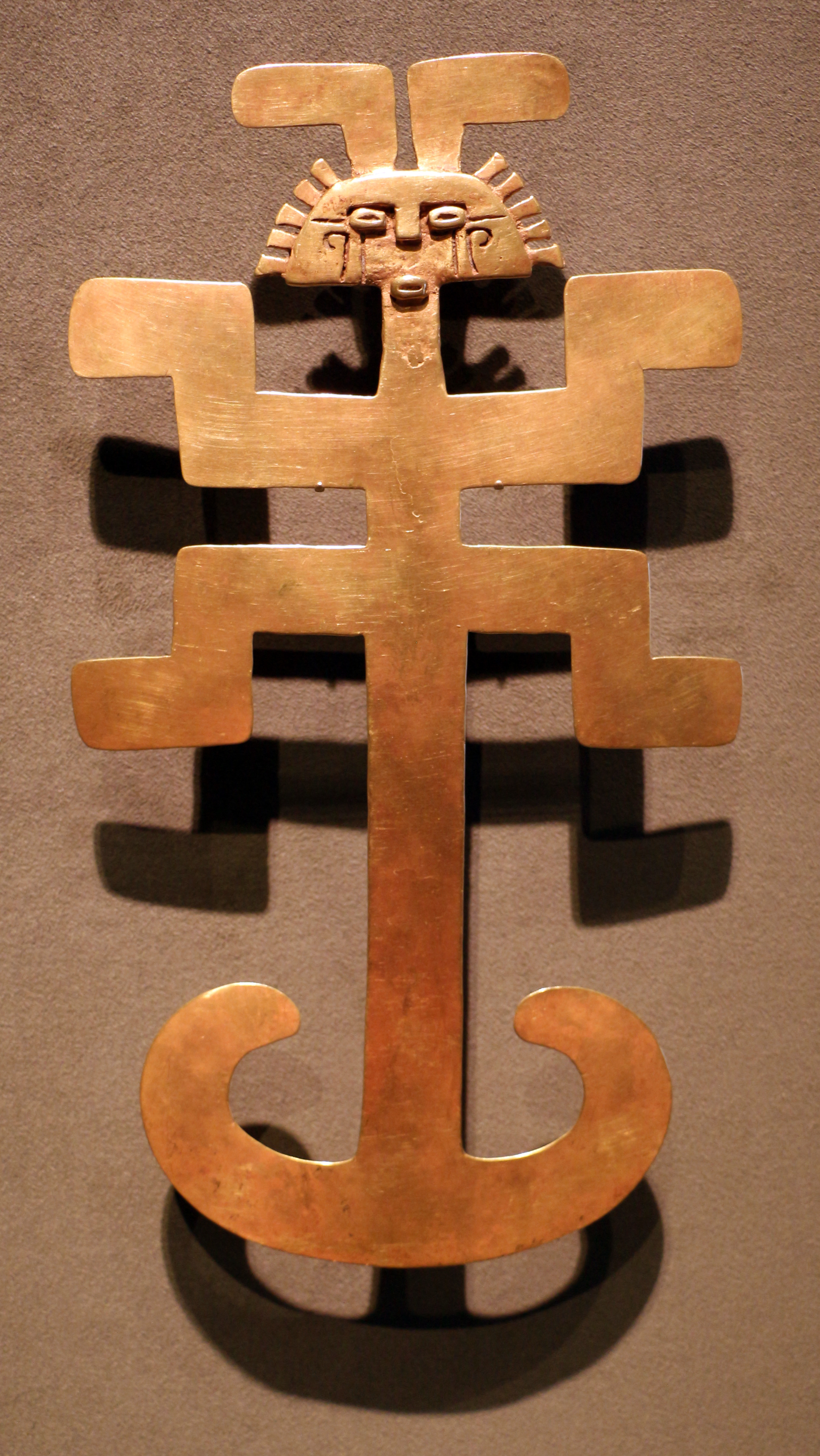
Pendant; 1st-7th century; gold; Cleveland Museum of Art (Cleveland, Ohio, USA)

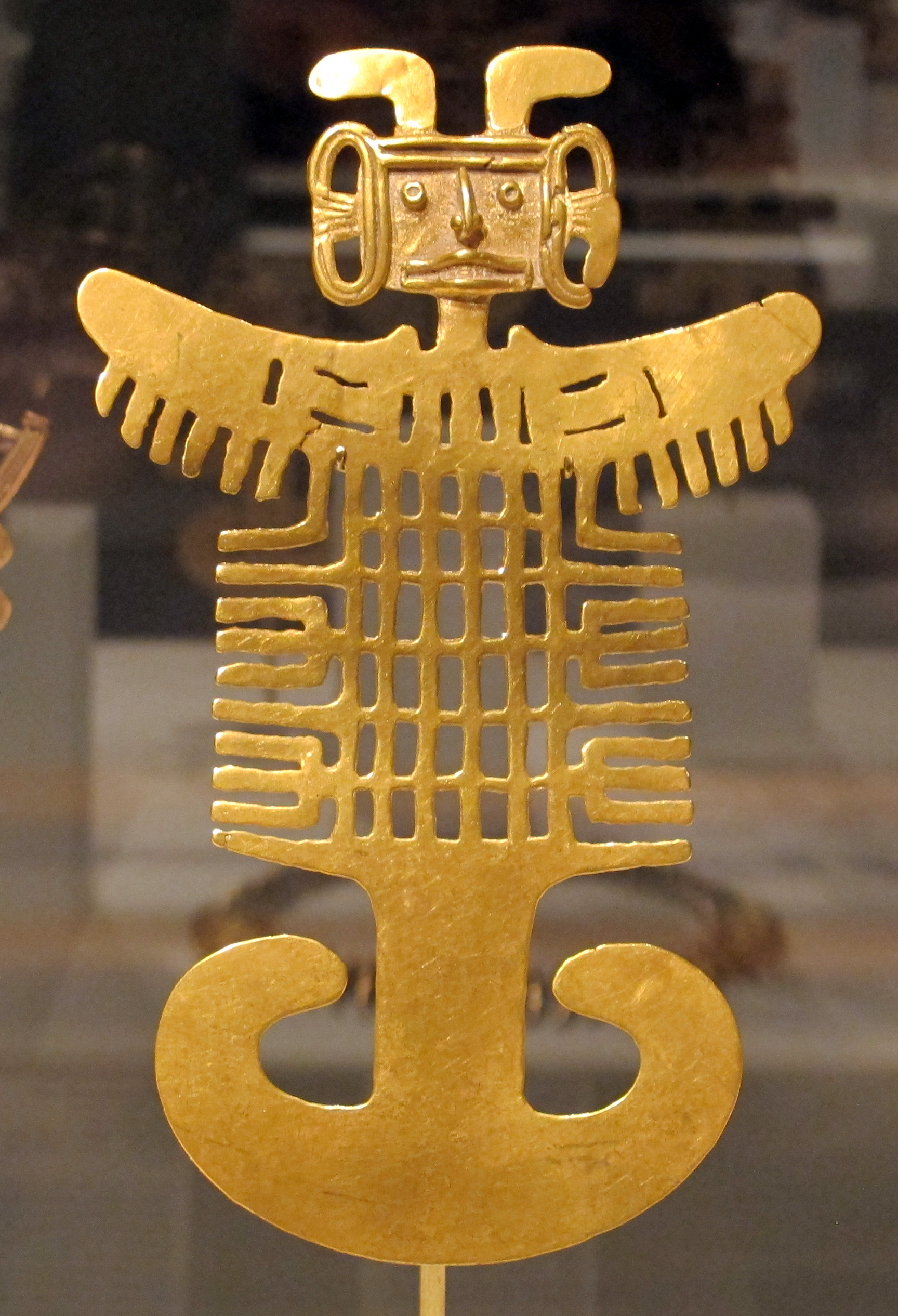
Anthropomorphic pendant; 5th-10th century; Metropolitan Museum of Art

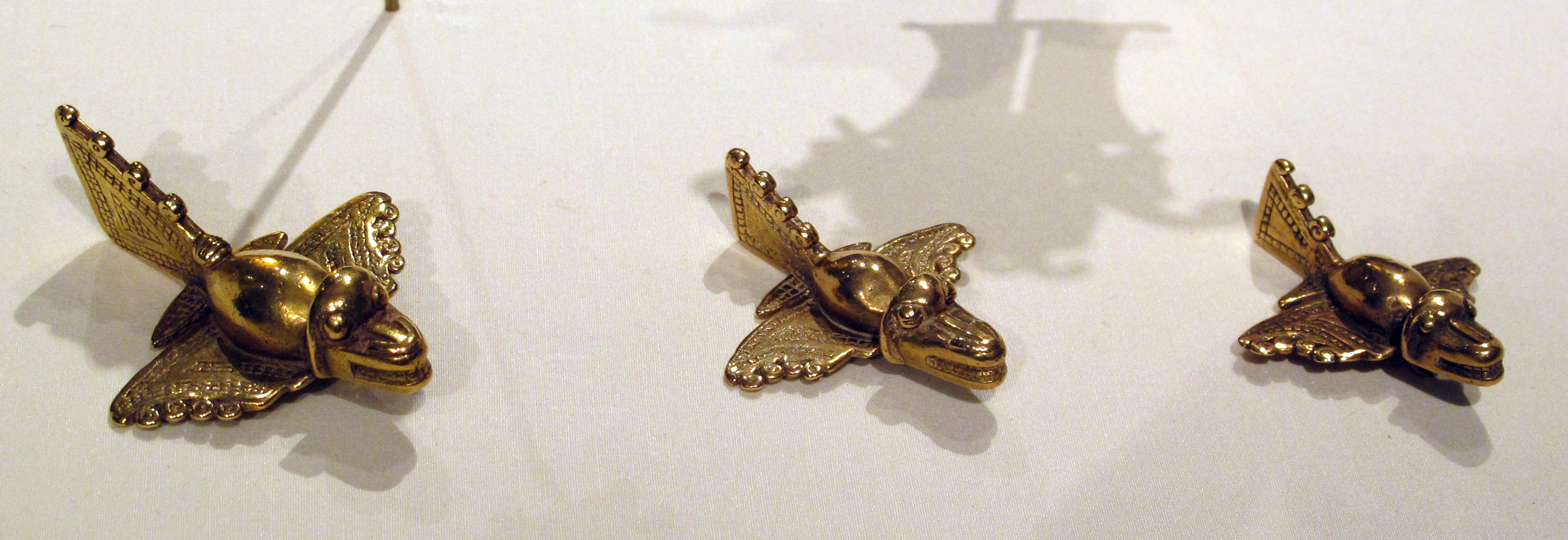
Pendants in the form of flying fish; 10th-15th century; Metropolitan Museum of Art (New York City)

==== Gran Coclé ====
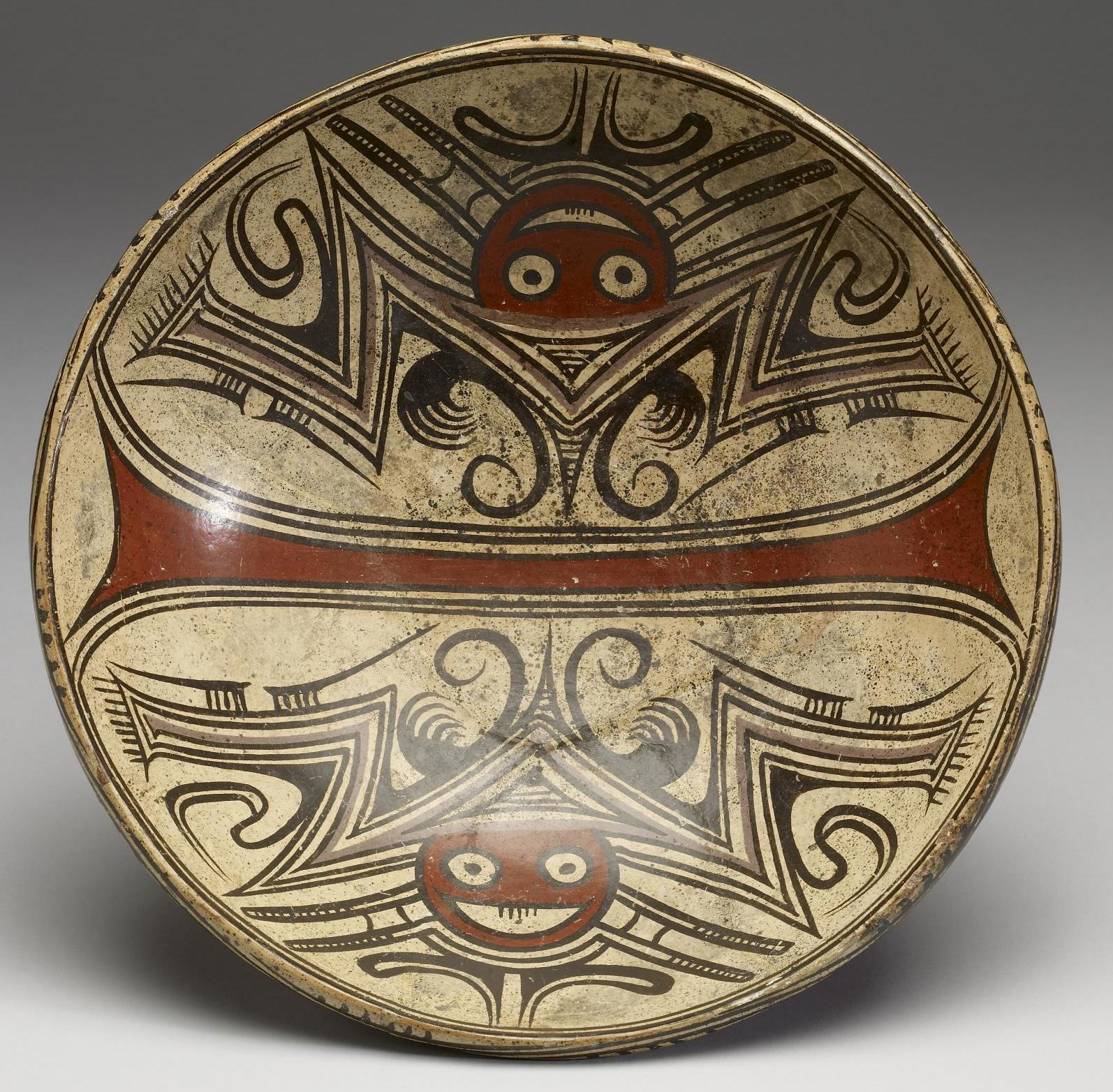
Pedestal dish; 600–800; height: 15.24 cm (6 in.), diameter: 27.69 cm (10 7/8 in.); Walters Art Museum

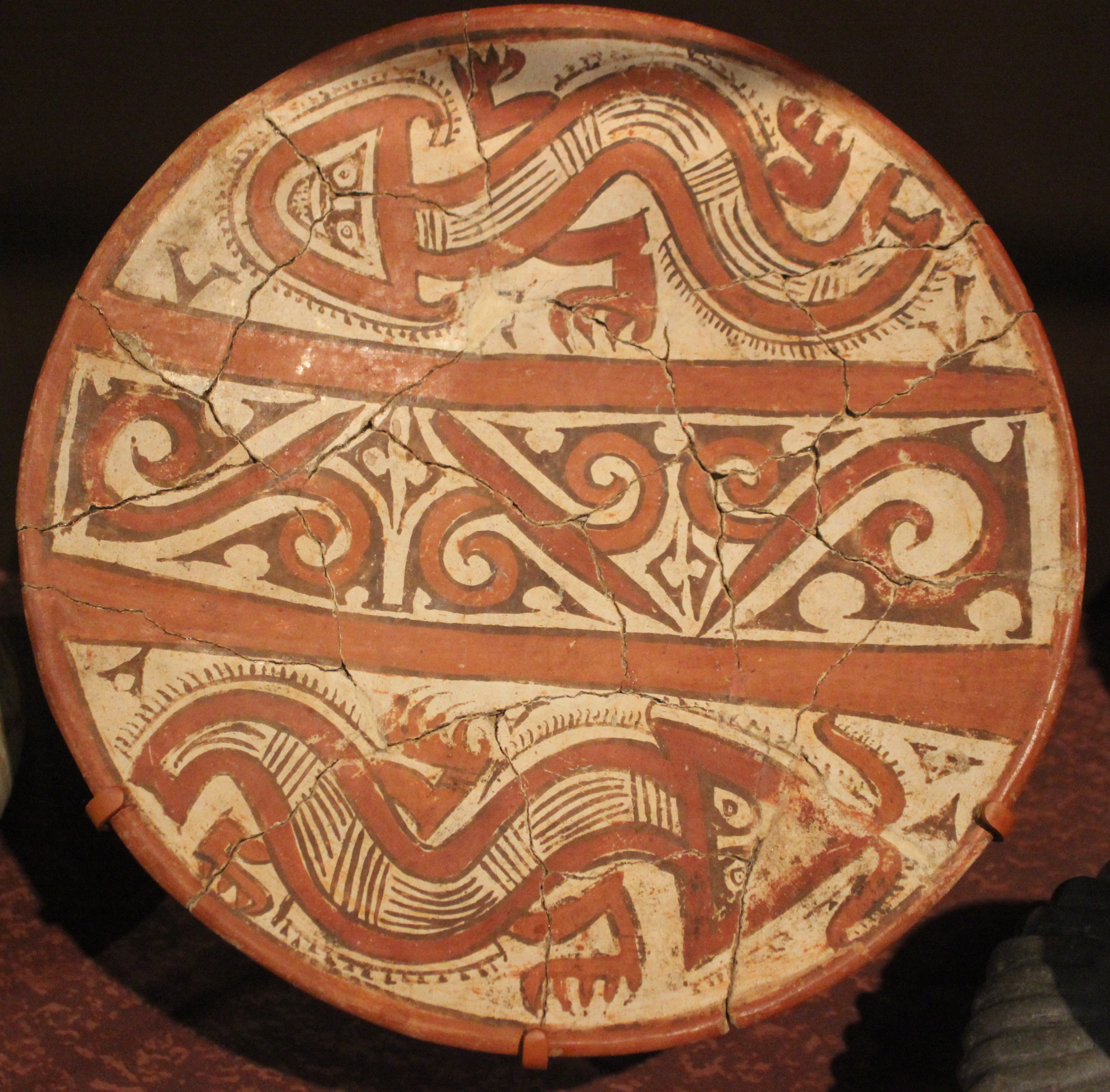
Ceramic plate; University of Pennsylvania Museum of Archaeology and Anthropology (USA)

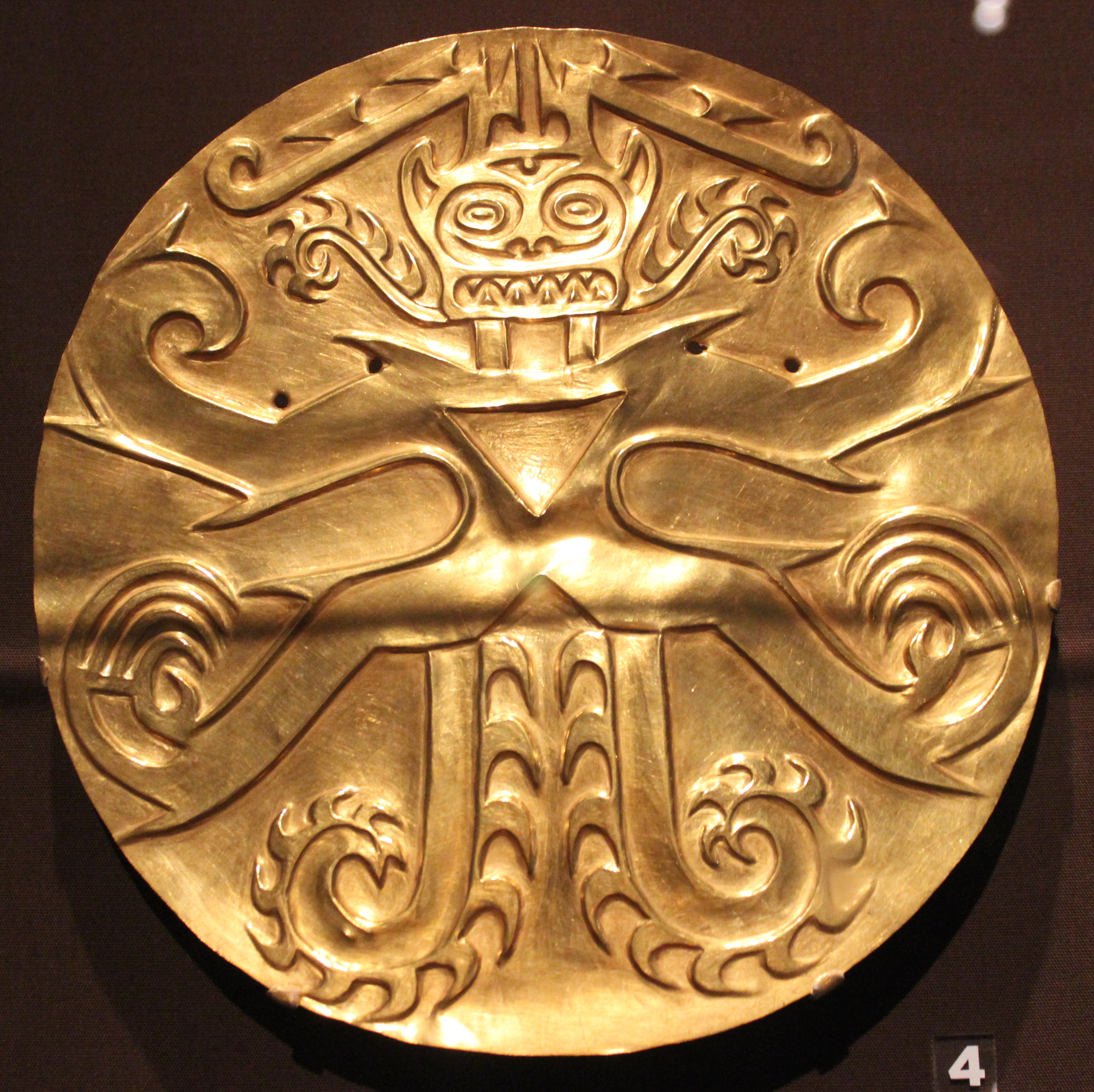
Gold plaque from Sitio Conte; University of Pennsylvania Museum of Archaeology and Anthropology

==== Diquis ====
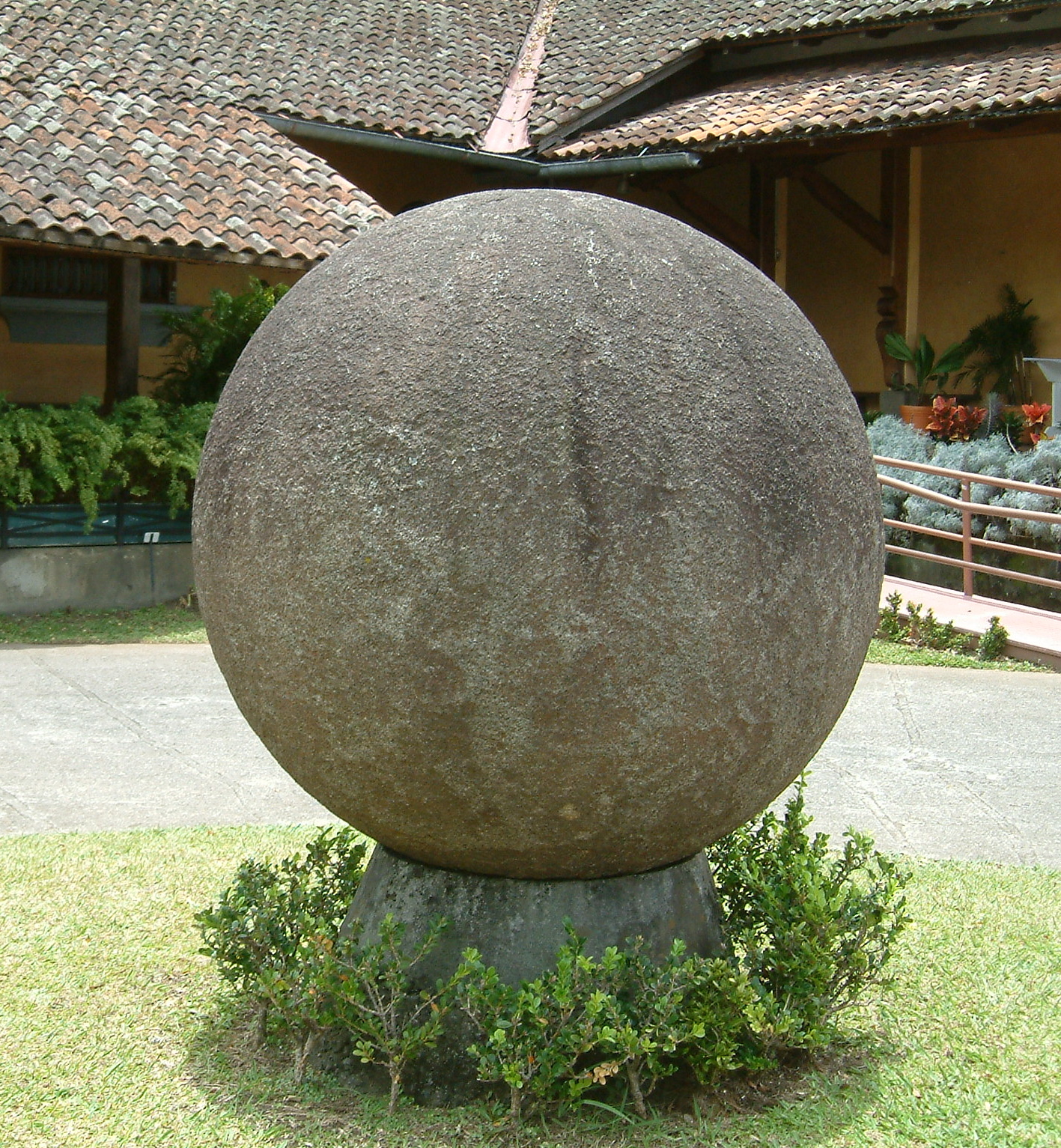
One of the stone spheres of Costa Rica

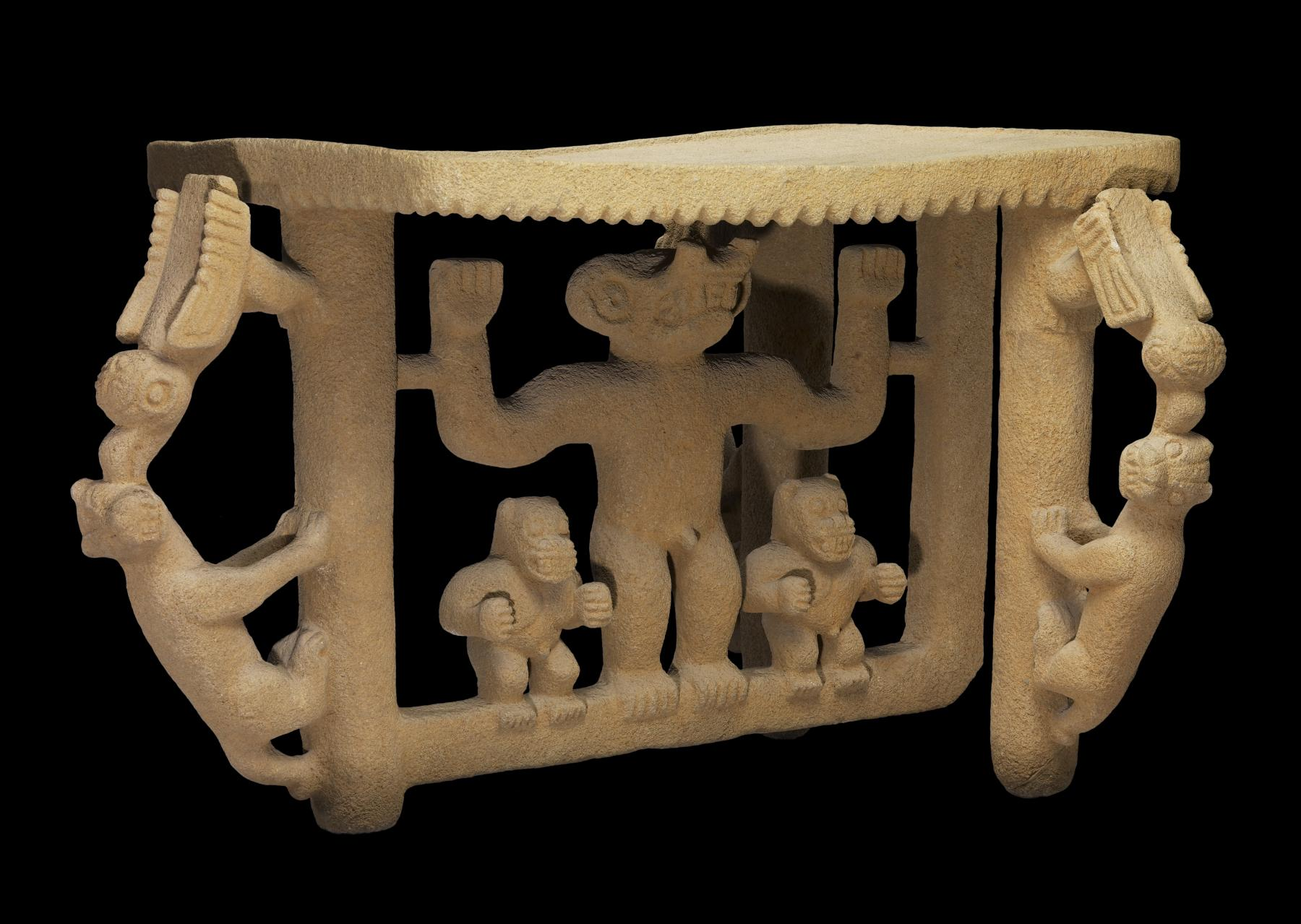
Ceremonial metate; 1500 BCE-1400; height: 56 cm (22 1/16 in.), width: 94.4 cm (37 3/16 in.), depth: 78 cm (30 11/16 in.); Walters Art Museum (Baltimore, USA)

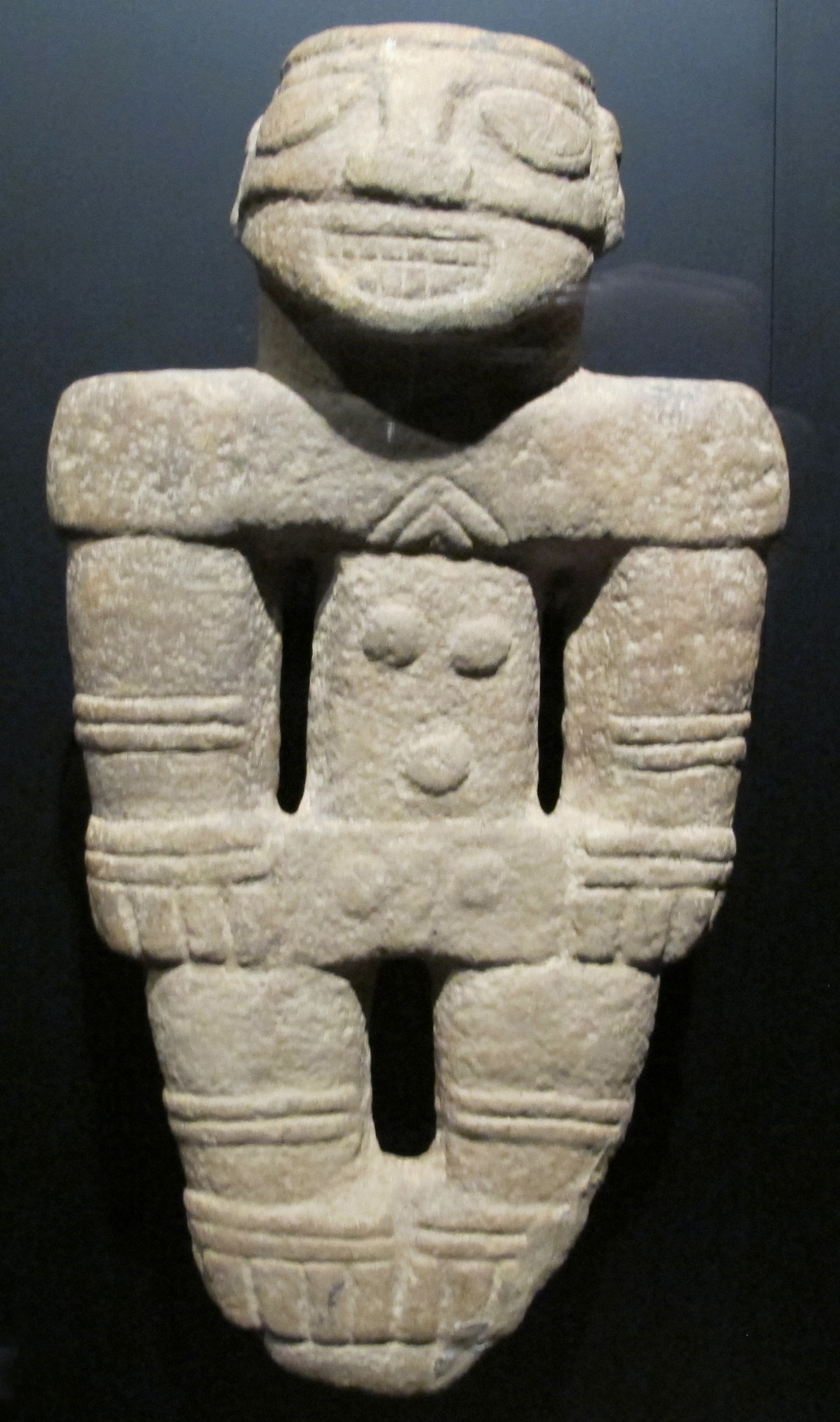
Stone figure resembling a masked shaman; 1000–1500; Musée du quai Branly (Paris)

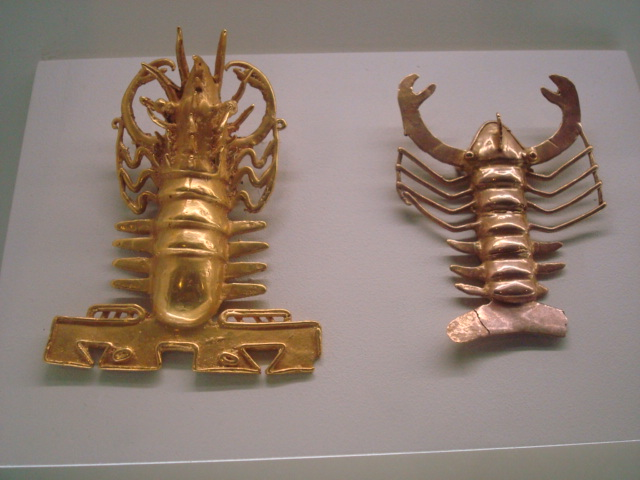
Two lobster-shaped pendants; 700–1550; Museo del Jade Marco Fidel Tristán Castro (San José, Costa Rica)

==== Nariño ====
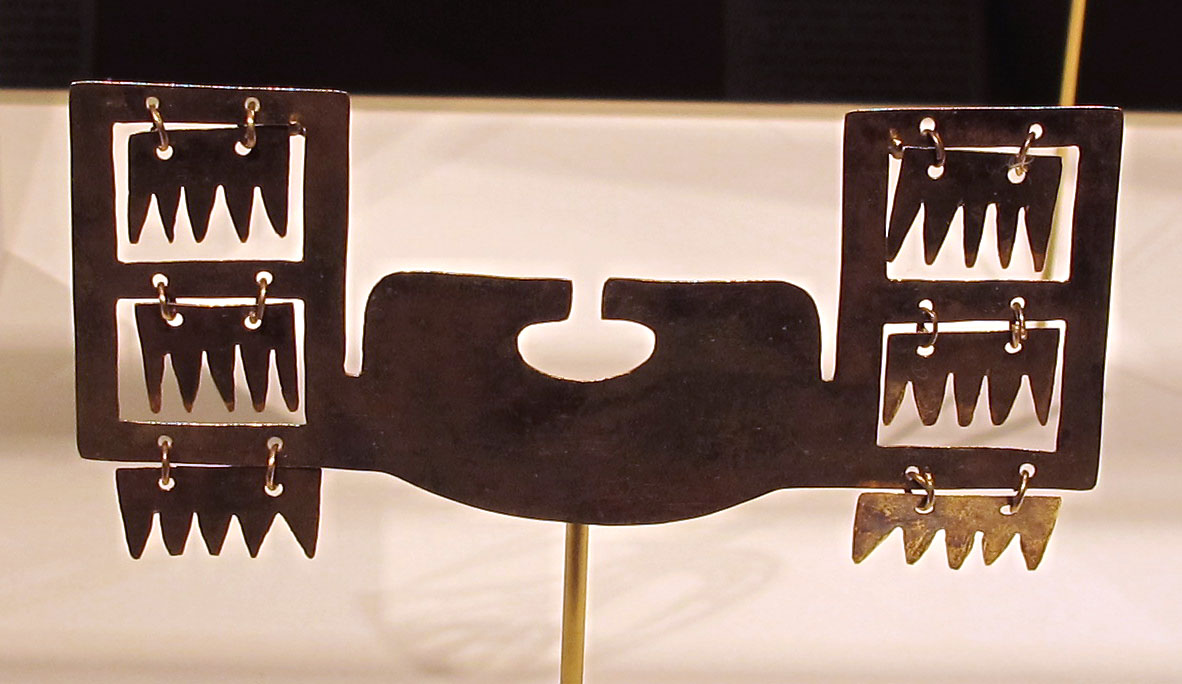
Nose ornament; 7th-12th century; cantilever gold alloy; Metropolitan Museum of Art

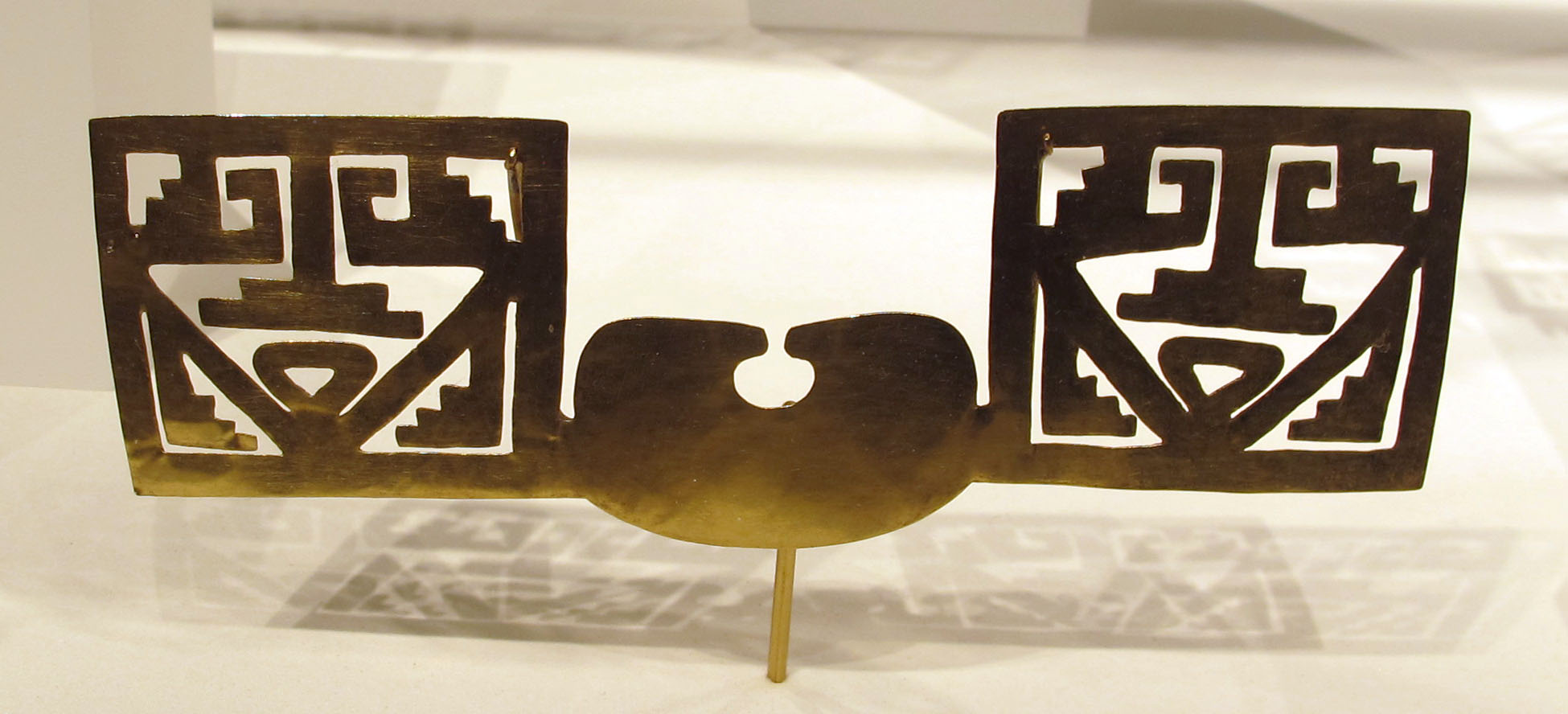
Nose ornament; 7th-12th century; cantilever gold alloy; Metropolitan Museum of Art

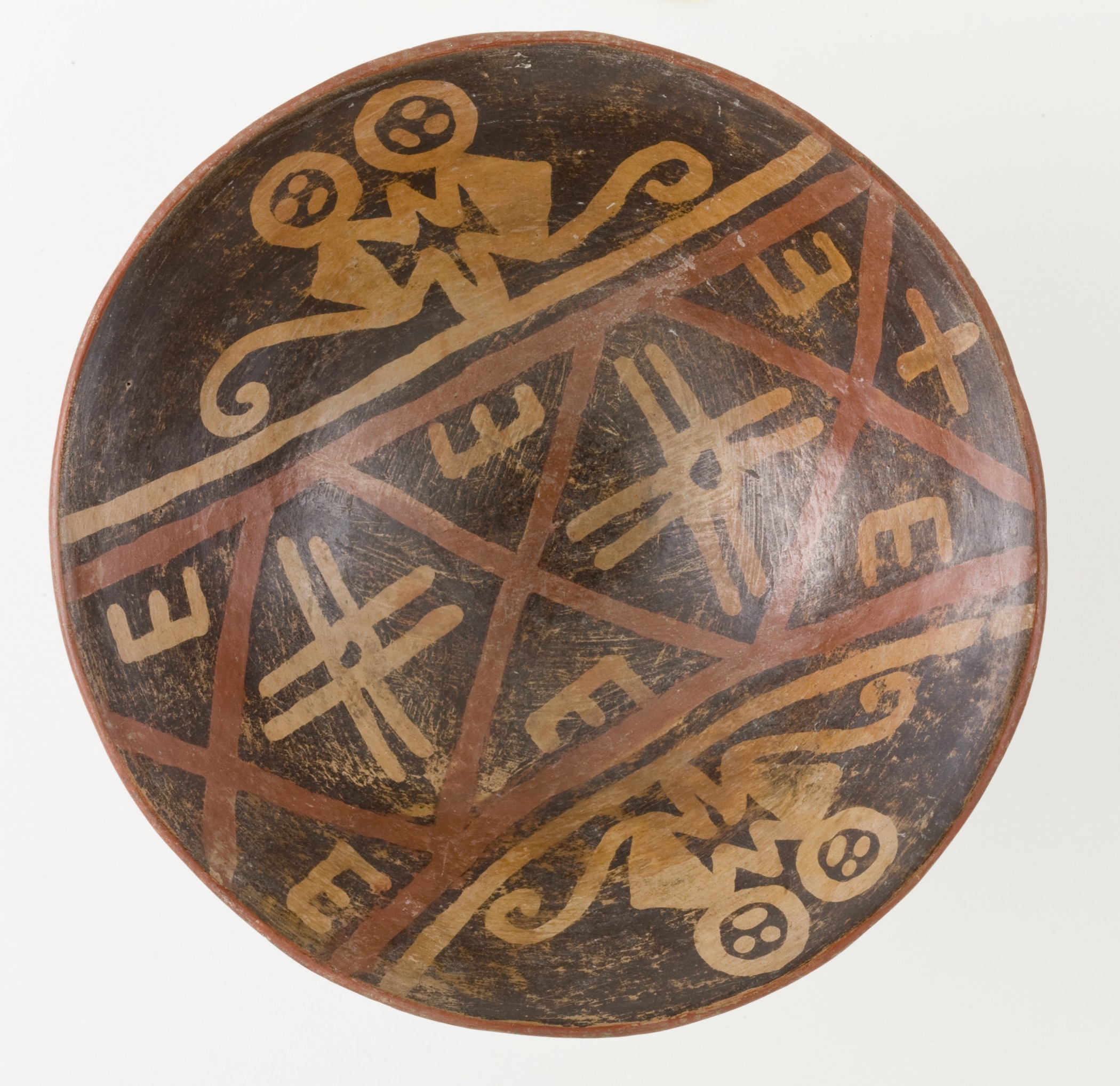
Footed bowl depicting a pair of monkeys; 750–1250; resist-painted ceramic; height: 8.9 cm (3 1/2 in.), diameter of the bowl: 20.48 cm (8 1/16 in.), diameter of the foot: 7.94 cm (3 1/8 in.); Los Angeles County Museum of Art (USA)

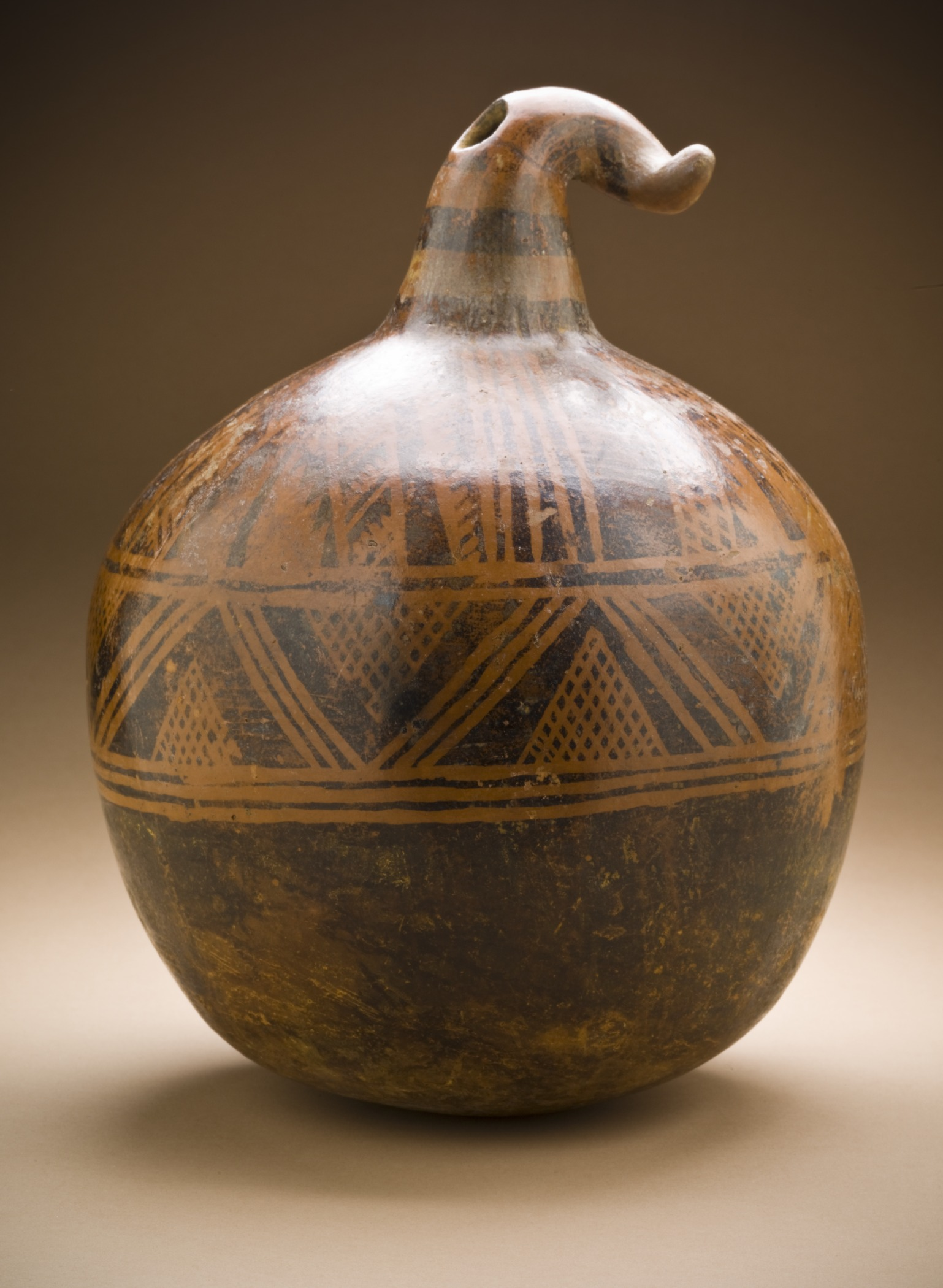
Gourd-shaped vessel; 850–1500; resist-painted ceramic; height: 26.35 cm (10 3/8in.), diameter: 20.32 cm (8 in.); Los Angeles County Museum of Art

==== Quimbaya ====
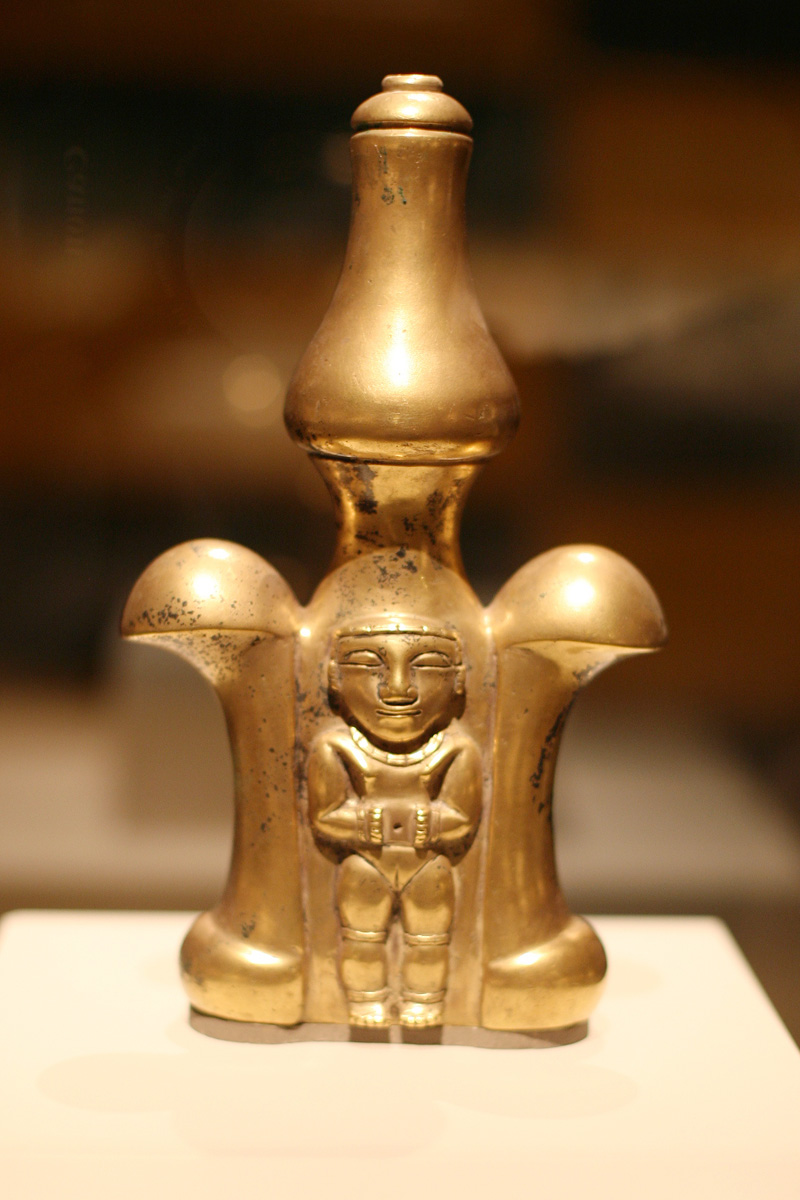
Lime container; 5th-9th century; gold; 23 cm (9 in) high; Metropolitan Museum of Art (New York City). Likely used by a member of the Quimbaya elite

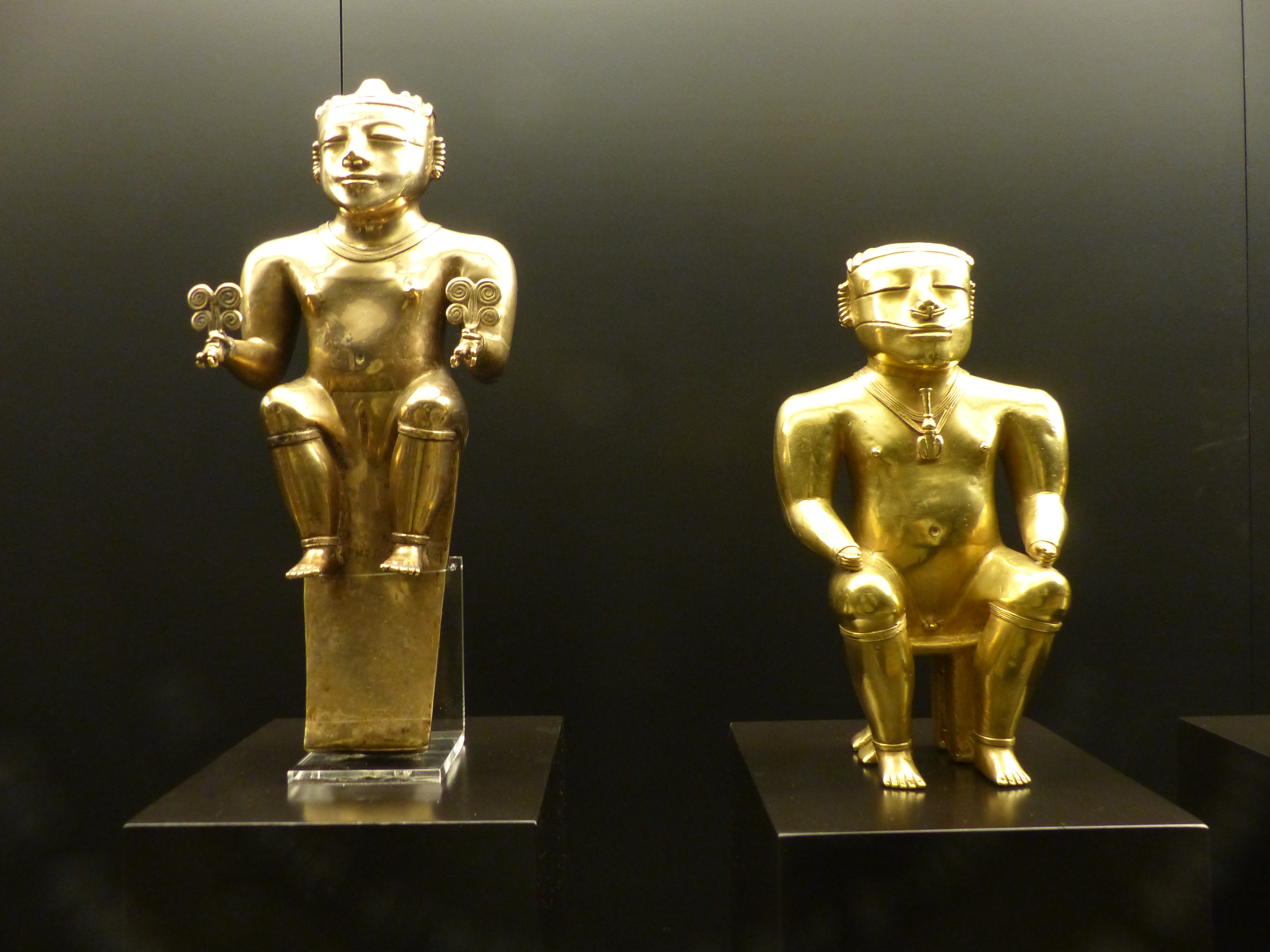
Two statues caciques sitting on stools; Museum of the Americas (Madrid, Spain)

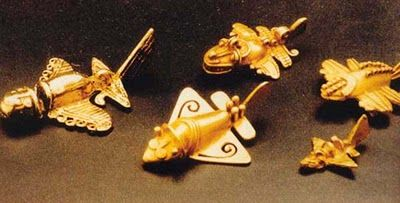
Quimbaya airplanes in Museum of the Americas (Madrid)

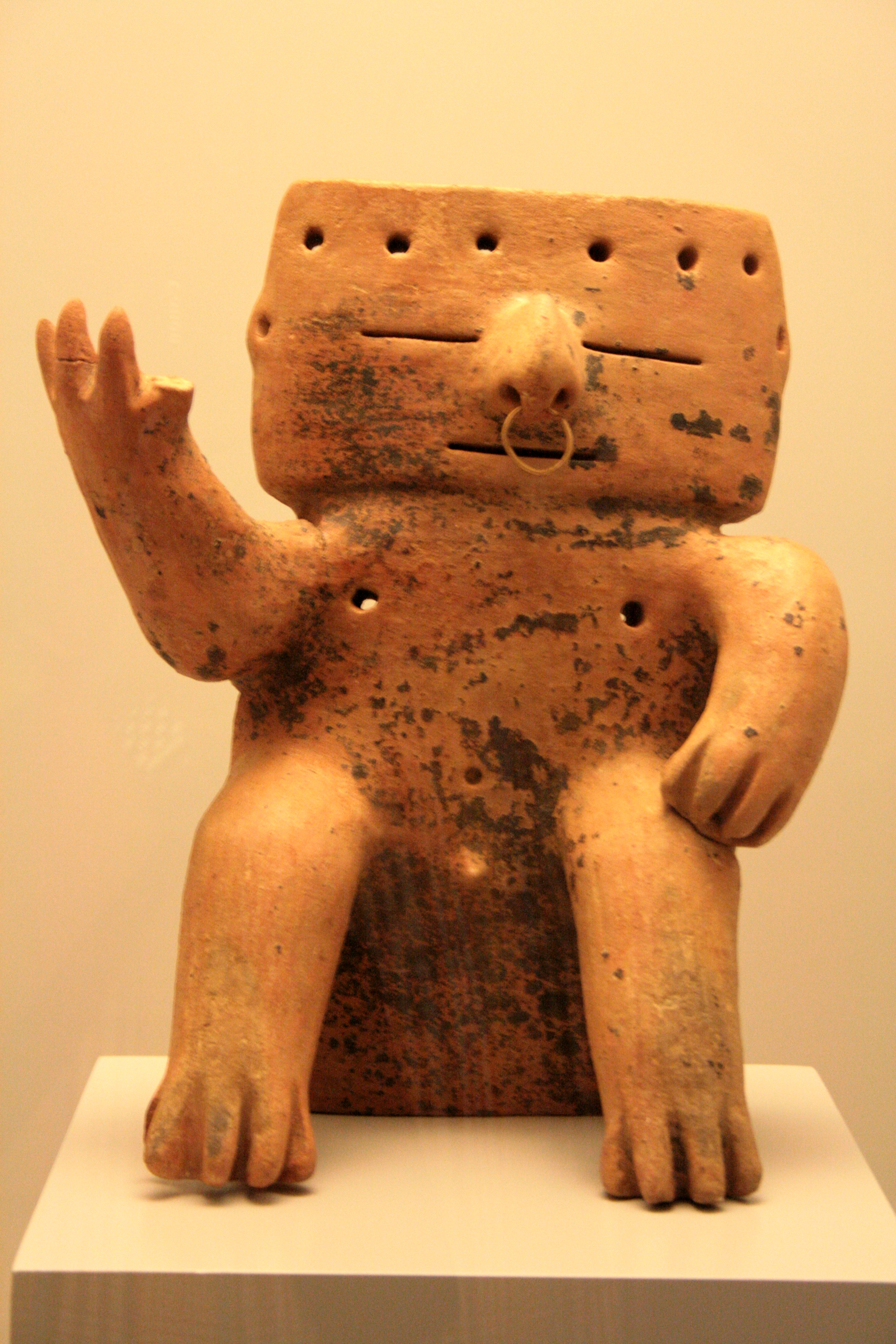
Ceramic figurine with tumbaga decoration; 1200–1500; Museum of the Americas

==== Muisca ====
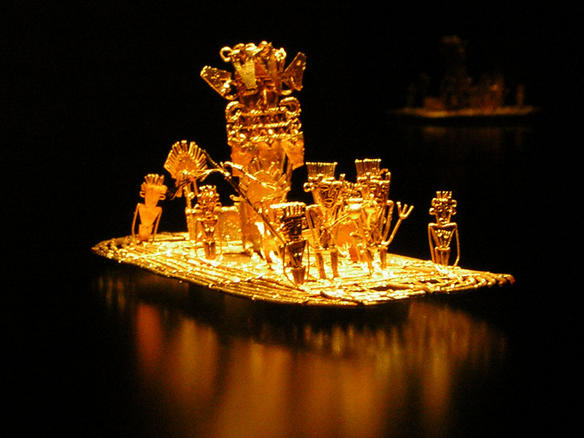
The Muisca raft; circa 600–1600; gold alloy; 19.5 x 10.1 cm; Gold Museum (Bogotá, Colombia)

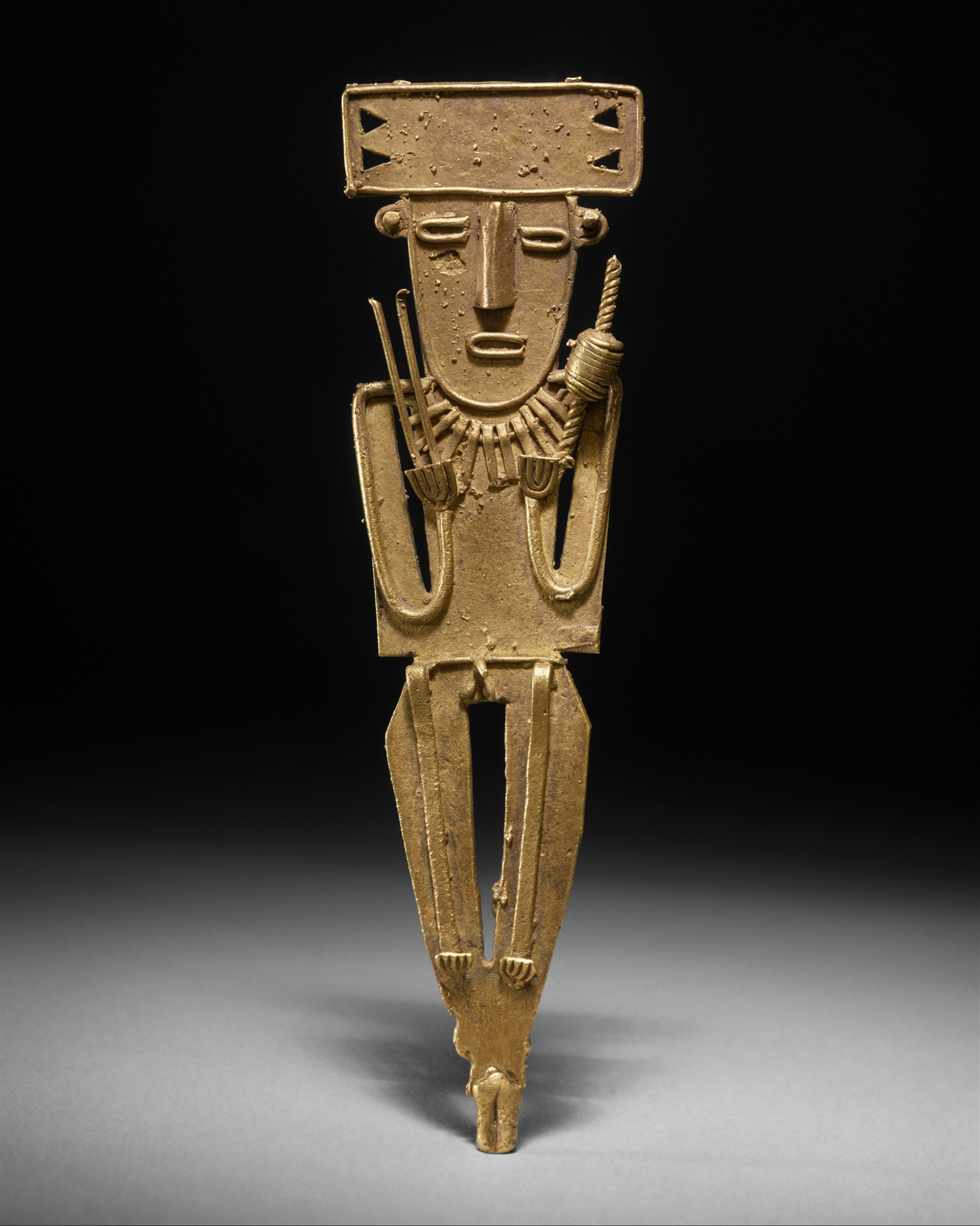
Tunjo; 10th-16th century; from Guatavita Lake region; Metropolitan Museum of Art (New York City)

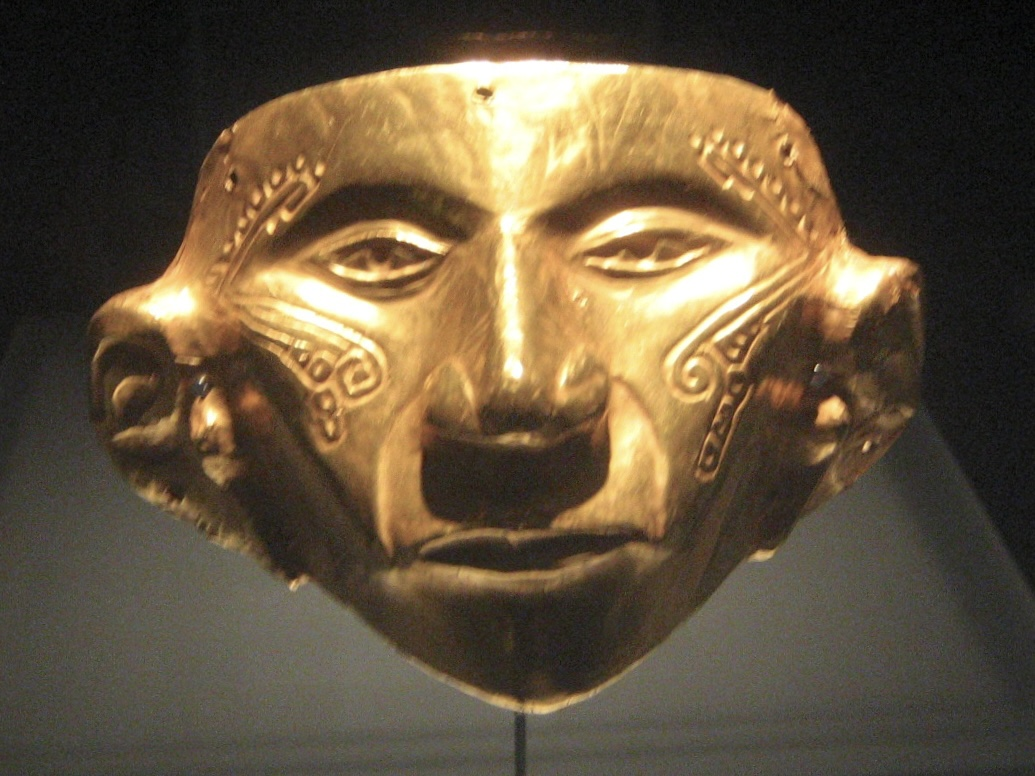
Mask; gold; 8.7 x 12.7 cm; Gold Museum (Bogotá)

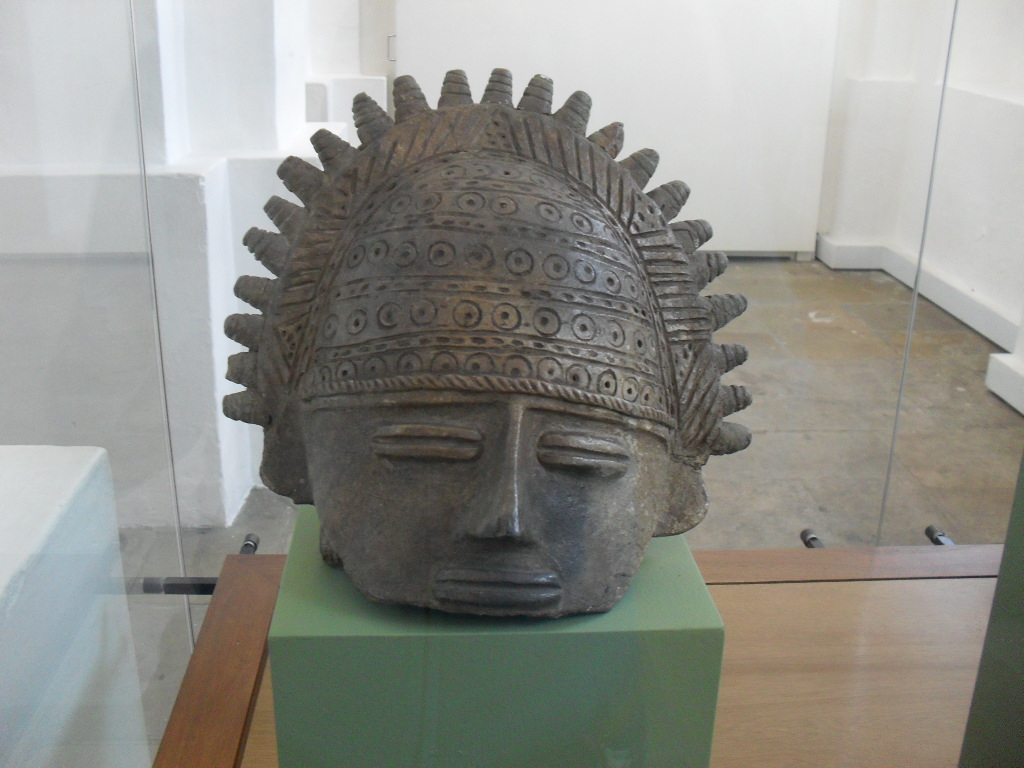
Ceramic mask; Colombian National Museum (Bogotá)

==== Zenú ====
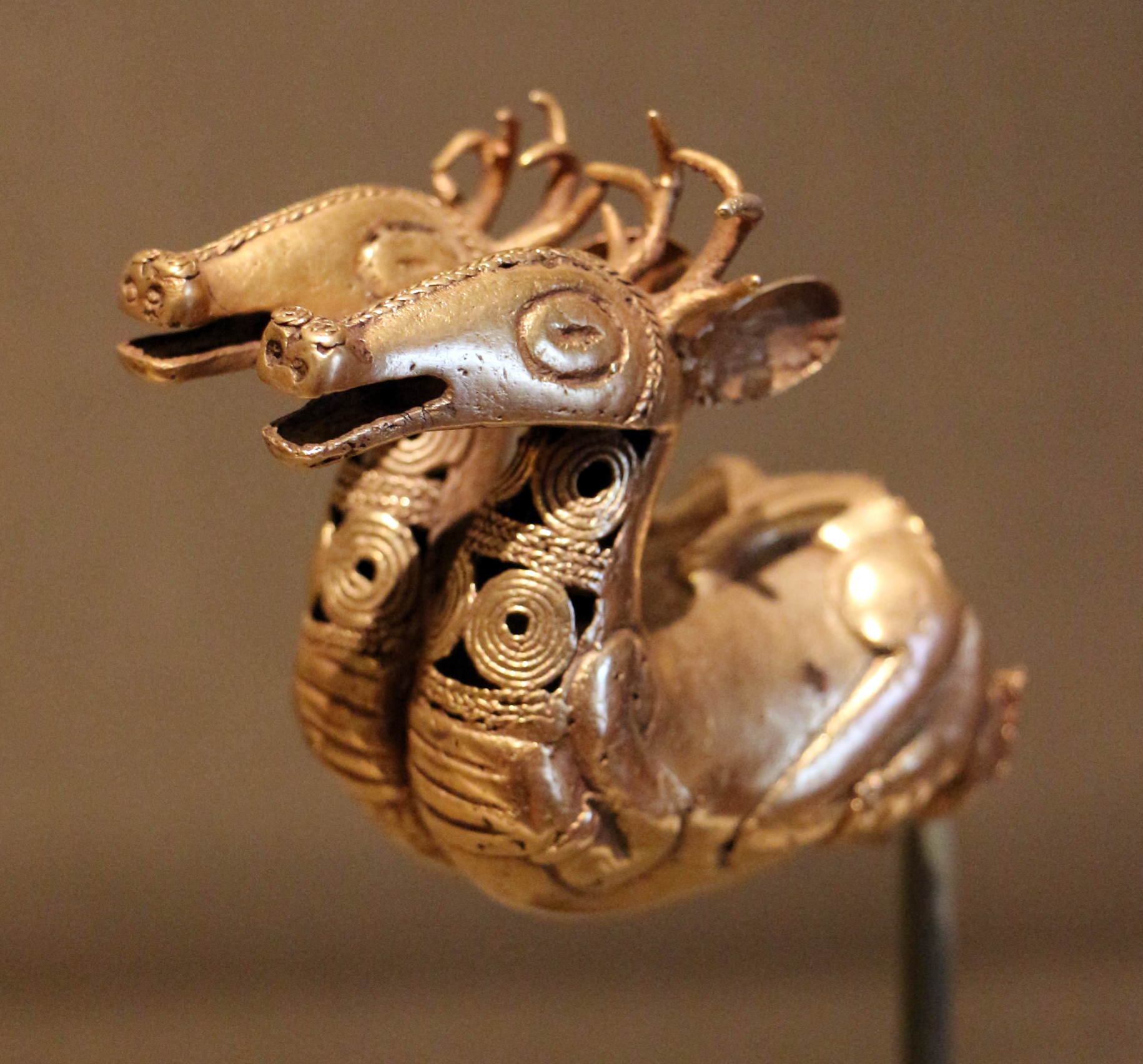
Two-headed deer-shaped ornament; circa 400–1000; Cleveland Museum of Art (Cleveland, Ohio, USA)

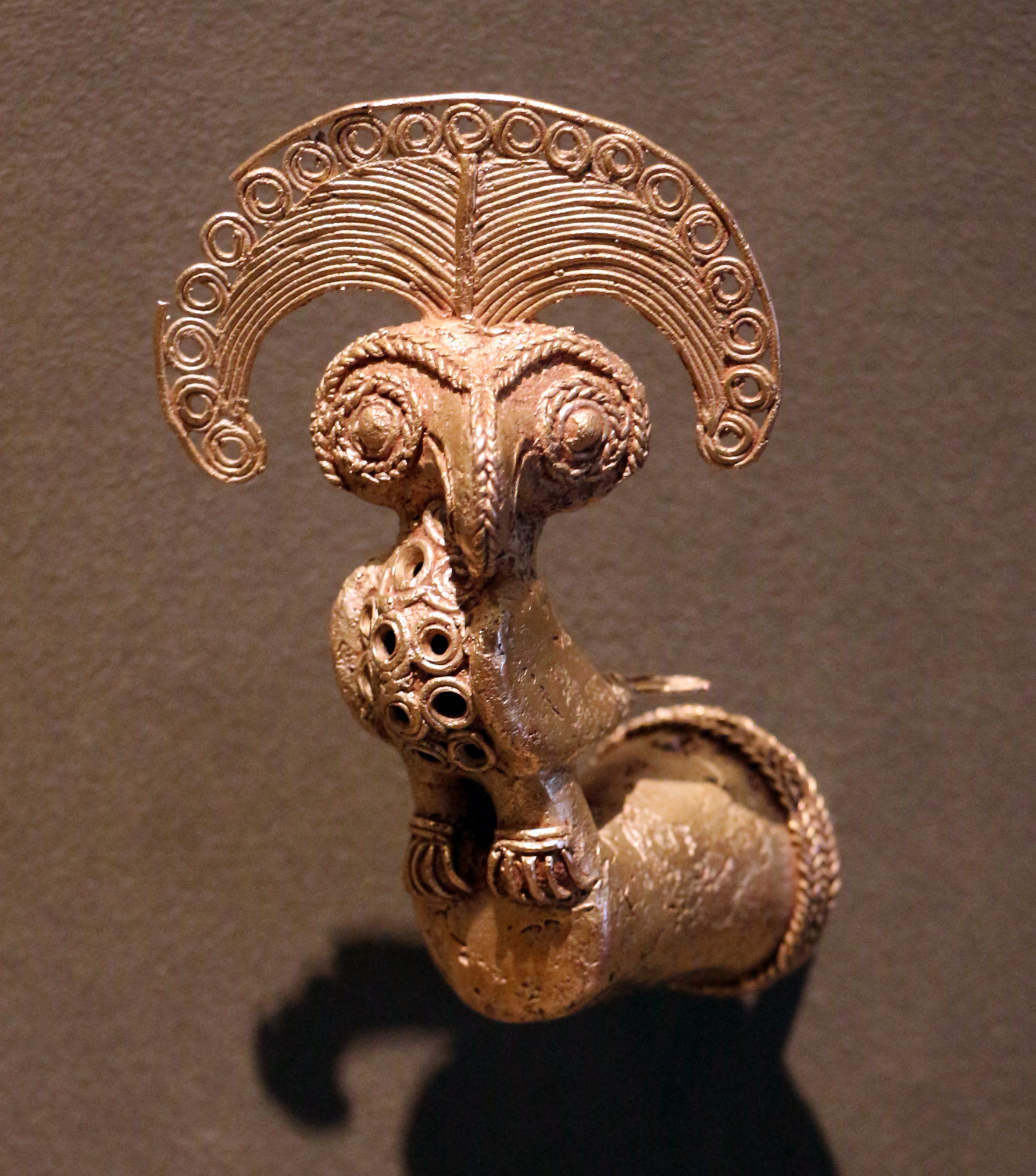
Owl-shaped ornament; circa 400–1000; Cleveland Museum of Art

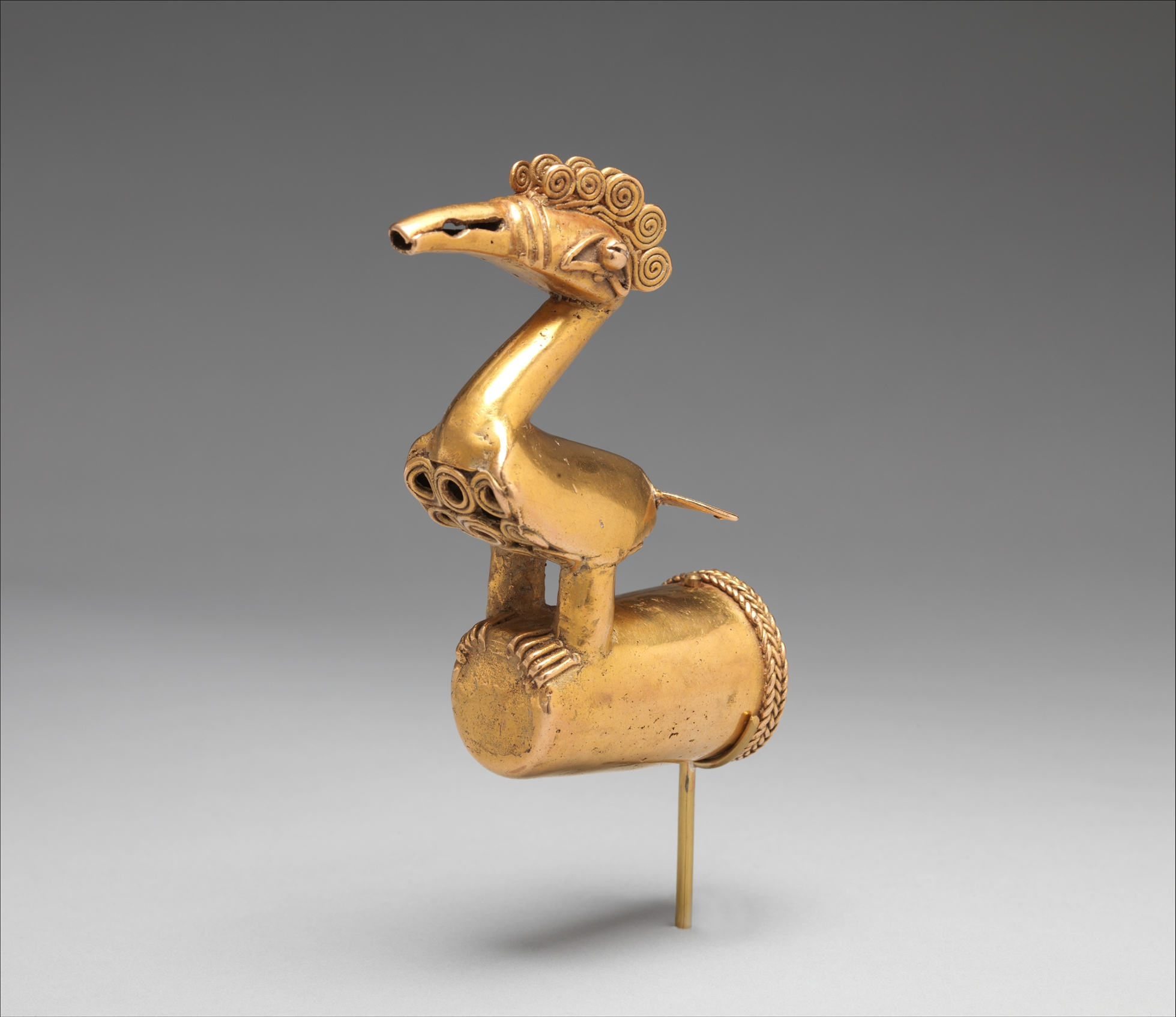
Bird finial; 5th–10th century; gold; height 12.1 cm (4 3/4 in.); Metropolitan Museum of Art (New York City)

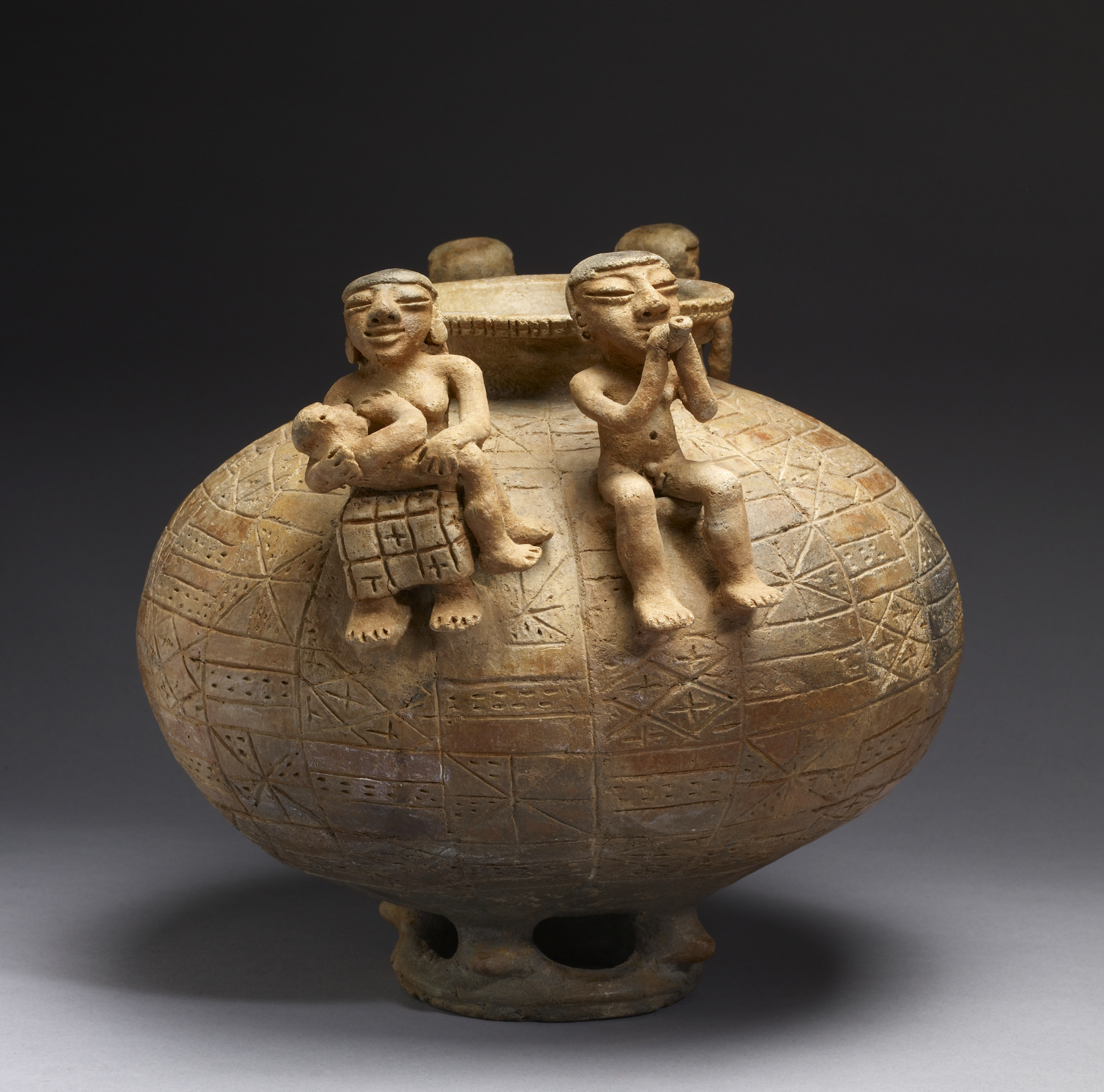
Olla with annular base and modeled figures; 500–1550; ceramic yellow-ware; height: 28.6 cm (11.2 in); width: 31.8 cm (12.5 in); Walters Art Museum (Baltimore, USA)

==== Tairona ====
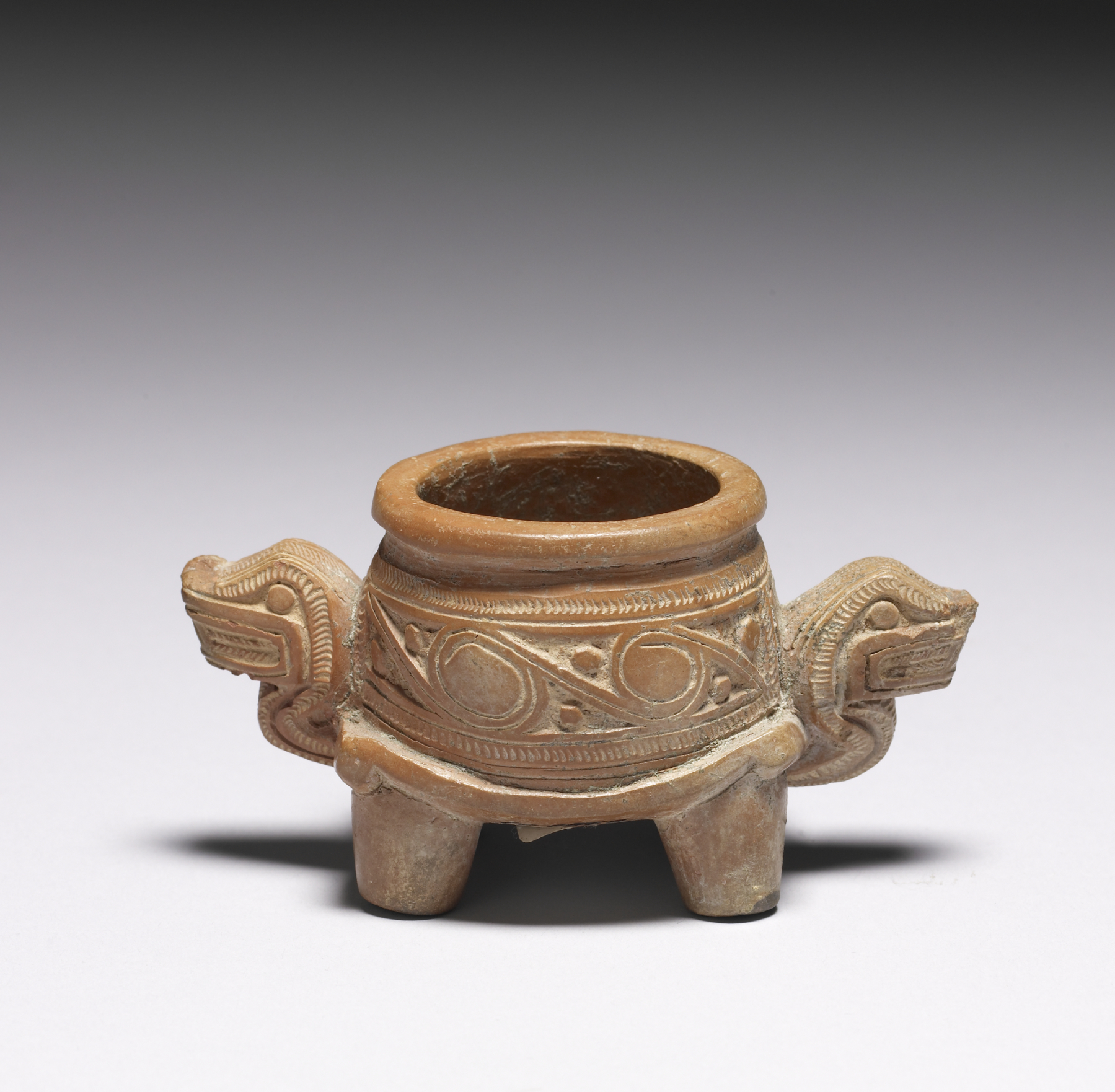
Small footed bowl with tiger head handles; 1000–1500; earthenware; 5 × 10.1 cm (2 × 4 in.); Walters Art Museum (Baltimore, USA)

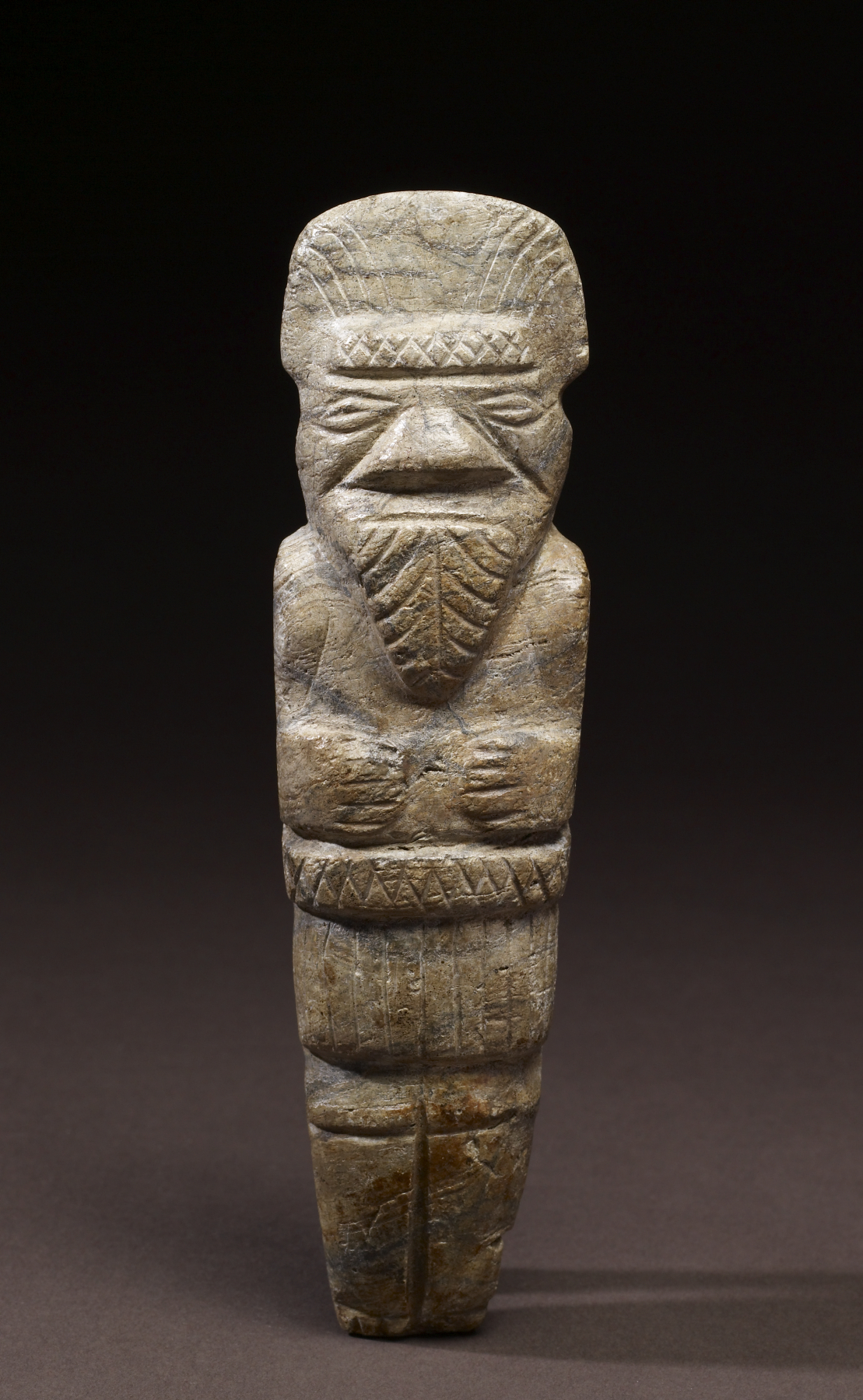
Ancestral figure; 1000–1550; brown stone; height: 18.1 cm (7.1 in), width: 4.8 cm (1.8 in); Walters Art Museum

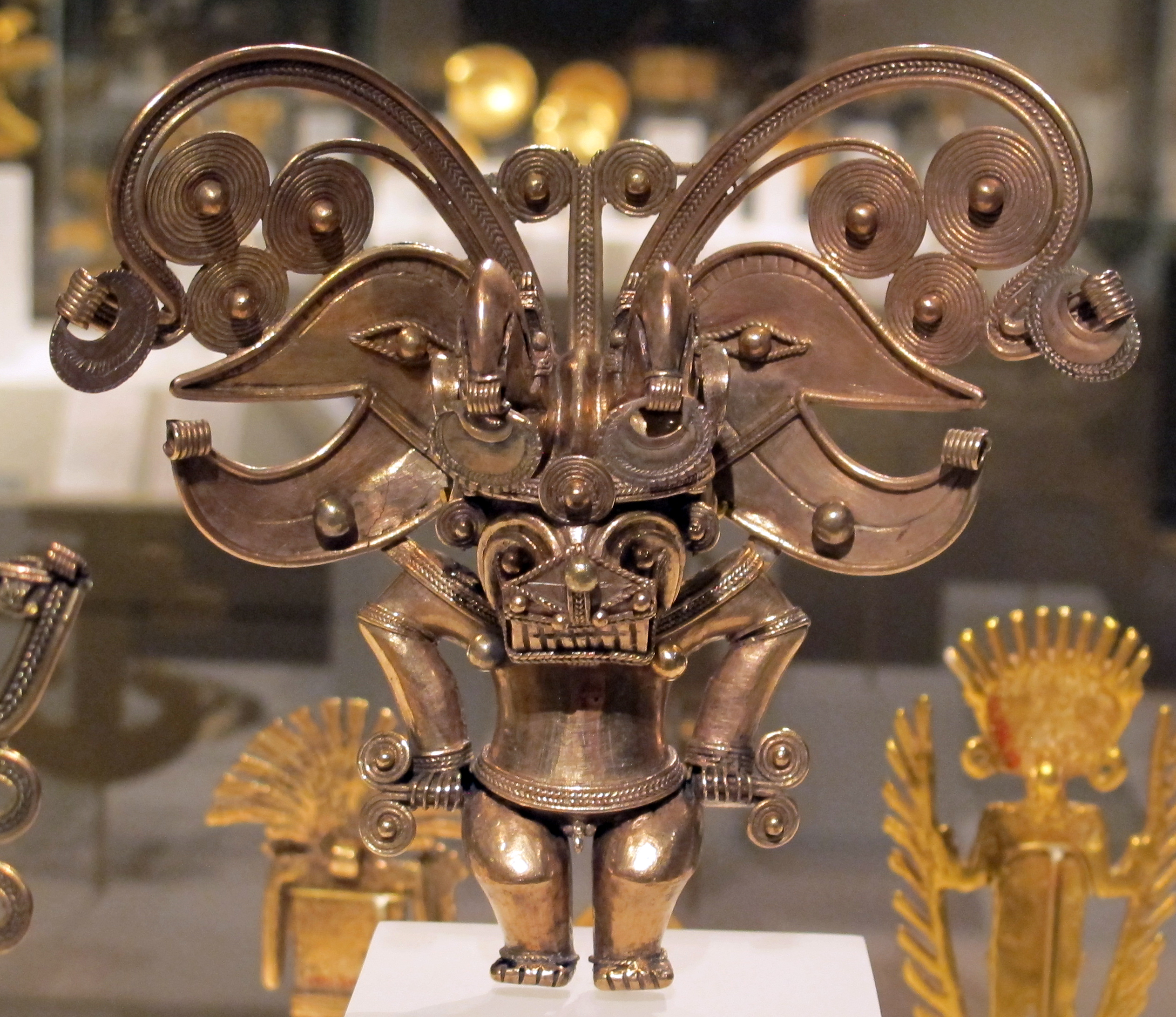
Anthropomorphic pendant; 1000–1550; gold alloy casting; width: 14.6 cm (5 3/4 in.); Metropolitan Museum of Art (New York City)

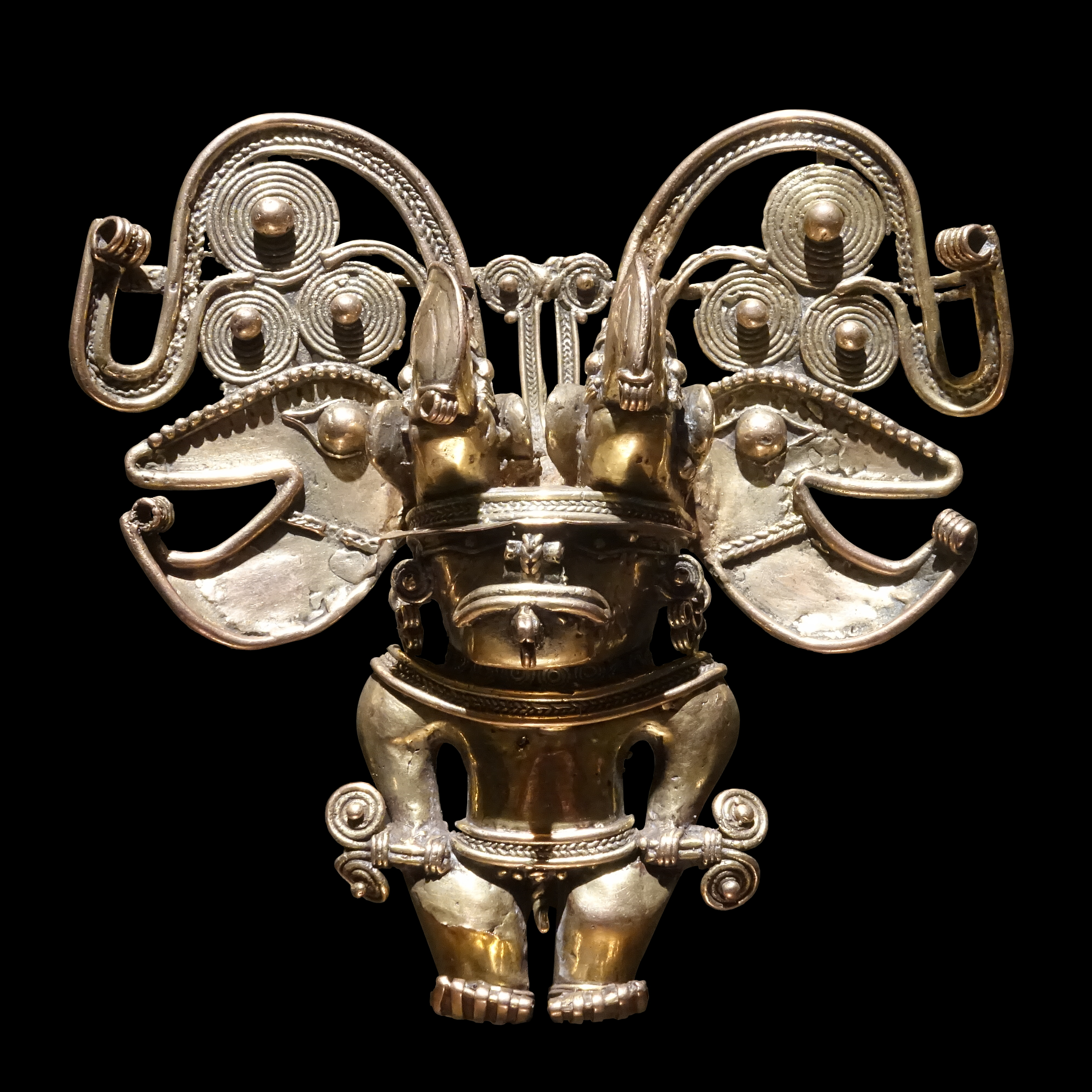
Anthropomorphic pendant; 18th century; gold; height: 13 cm (5.1 in), width: 13 cm (5.1 in), depth: 4.5 cm (1.7 in); Musée du Quai Branly (Paris)

=== Andes Region ===
==== Valdivia ====
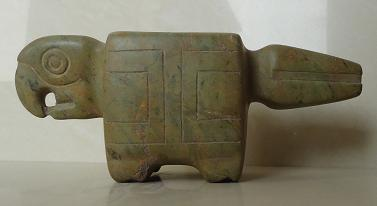
Parrot figure; 4000-1500 BC

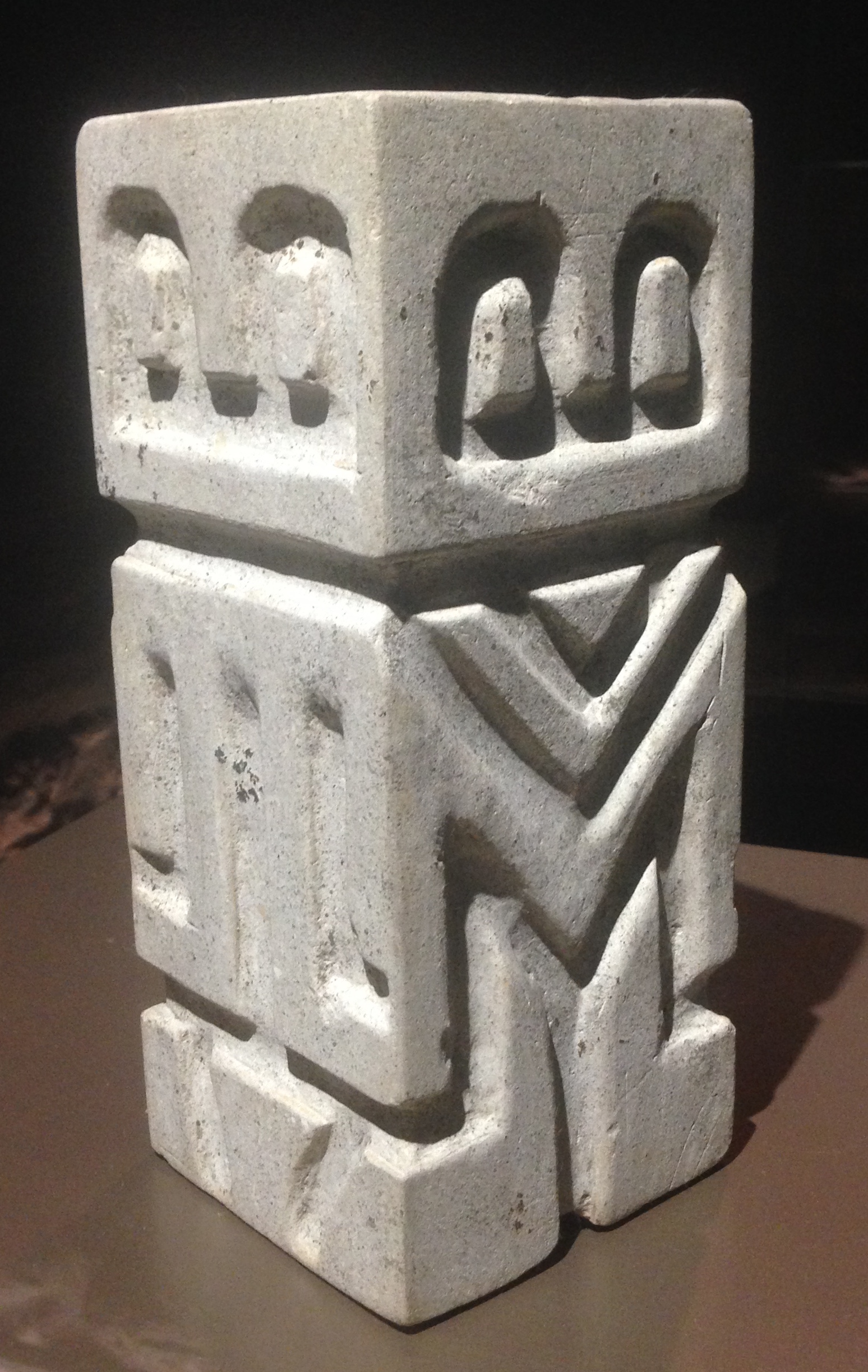
Ancestor statue with six faces; Casa del Alabado Museum of Pre-Columbian Art (Quito, Ecuador)

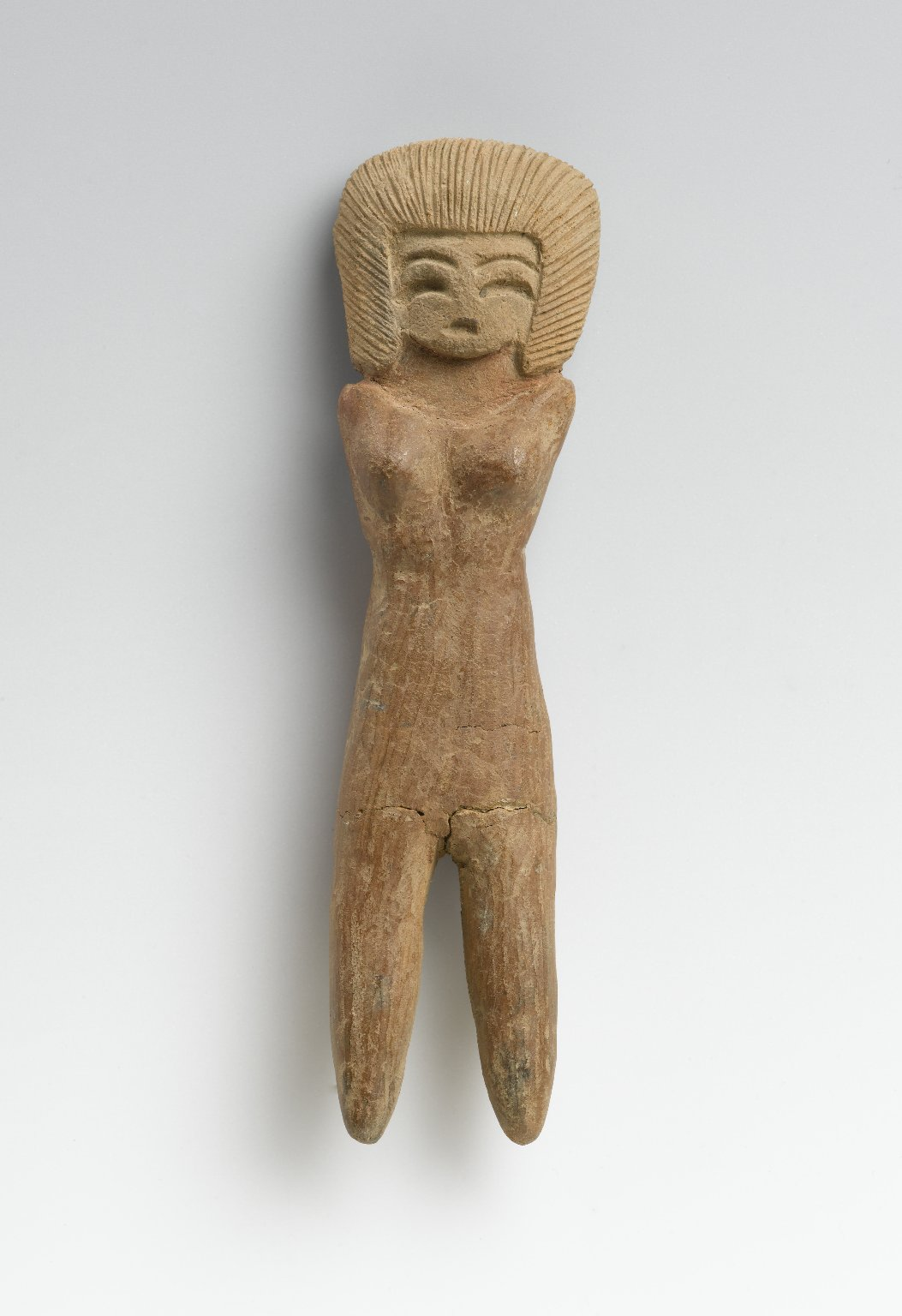
Female figurine; 2600-1500 BCE; ceramic; 11 x 2.9 x 1.6 cm (4 5/16 x 1 1/8 x 5/8 in.); Brooklyn Museum (New York City)

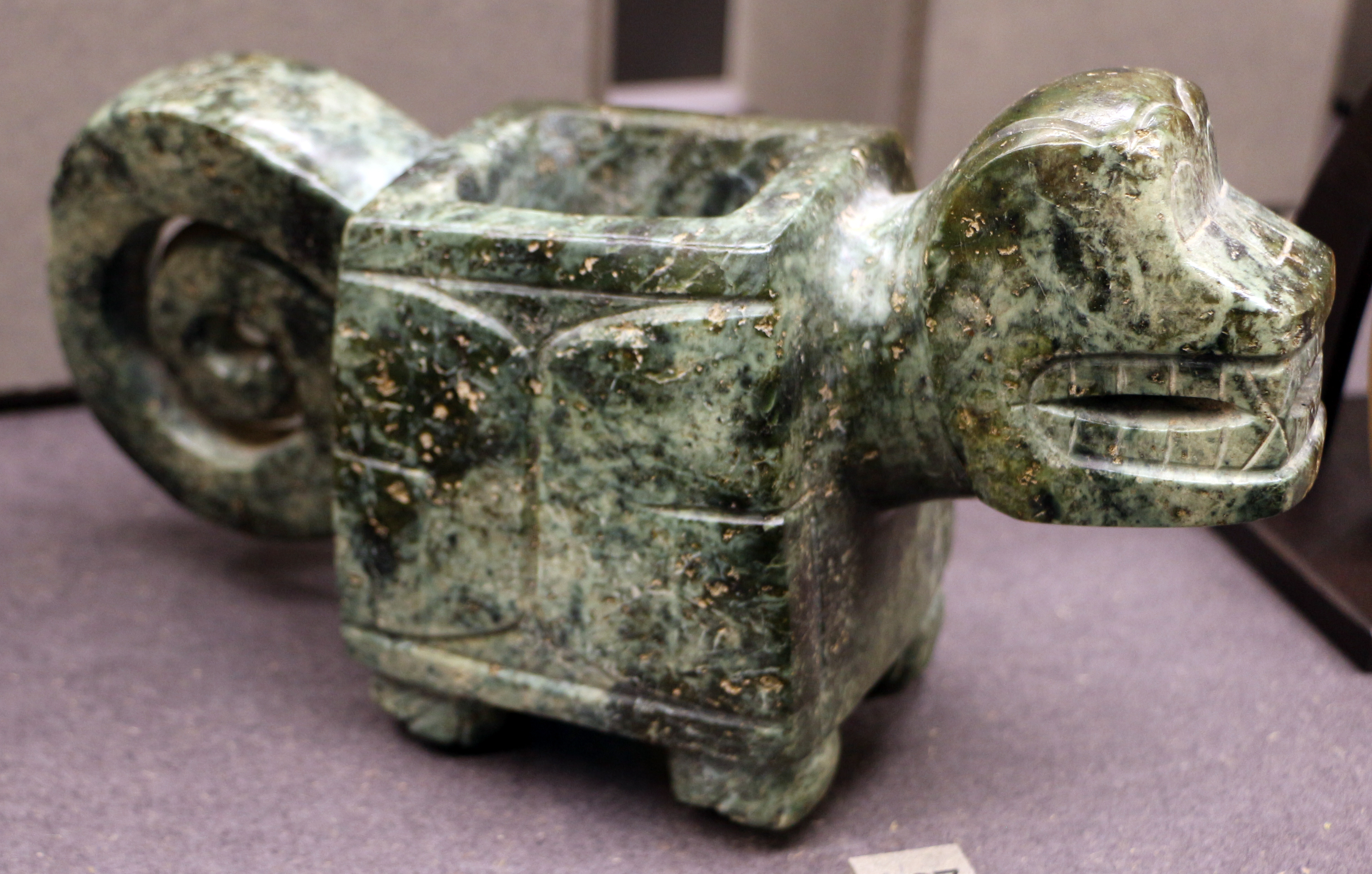
Jaguar-shaped figure; 2000-1000 BCE; green serpentine

==== Chavín ====
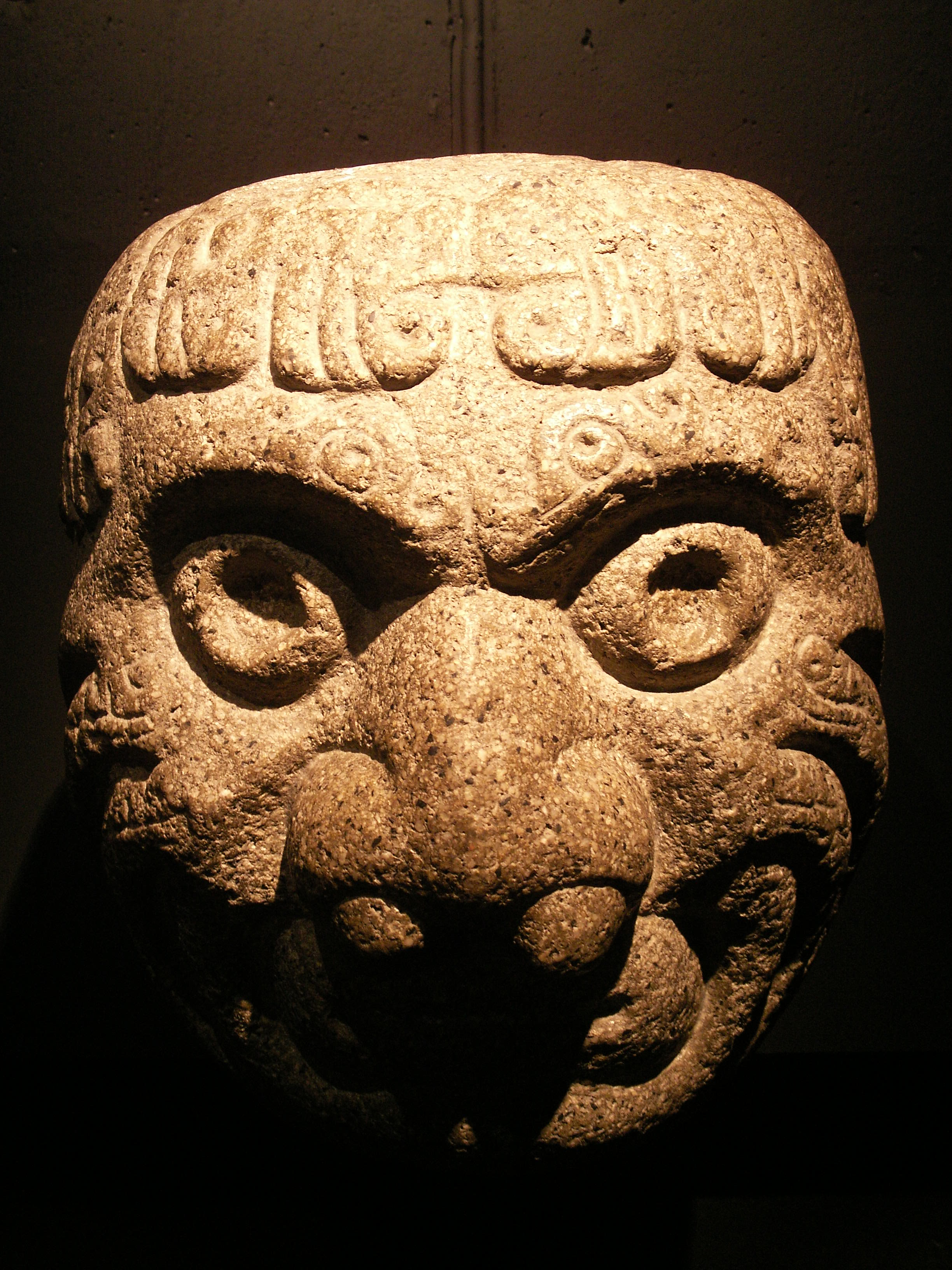
A Chavin stone sculpture in the shape of a head of a man, an ornament from a wall; 9th century BCE; Museo de la Nación (Lima, Peru)

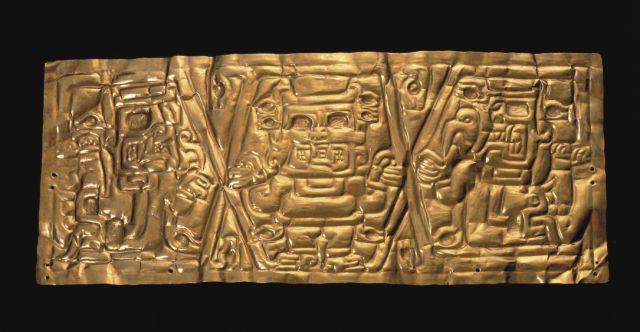
Chavin crown; 1200 BCE-1 CE (Formative Epoch); gold; Larco Museum (Lima)

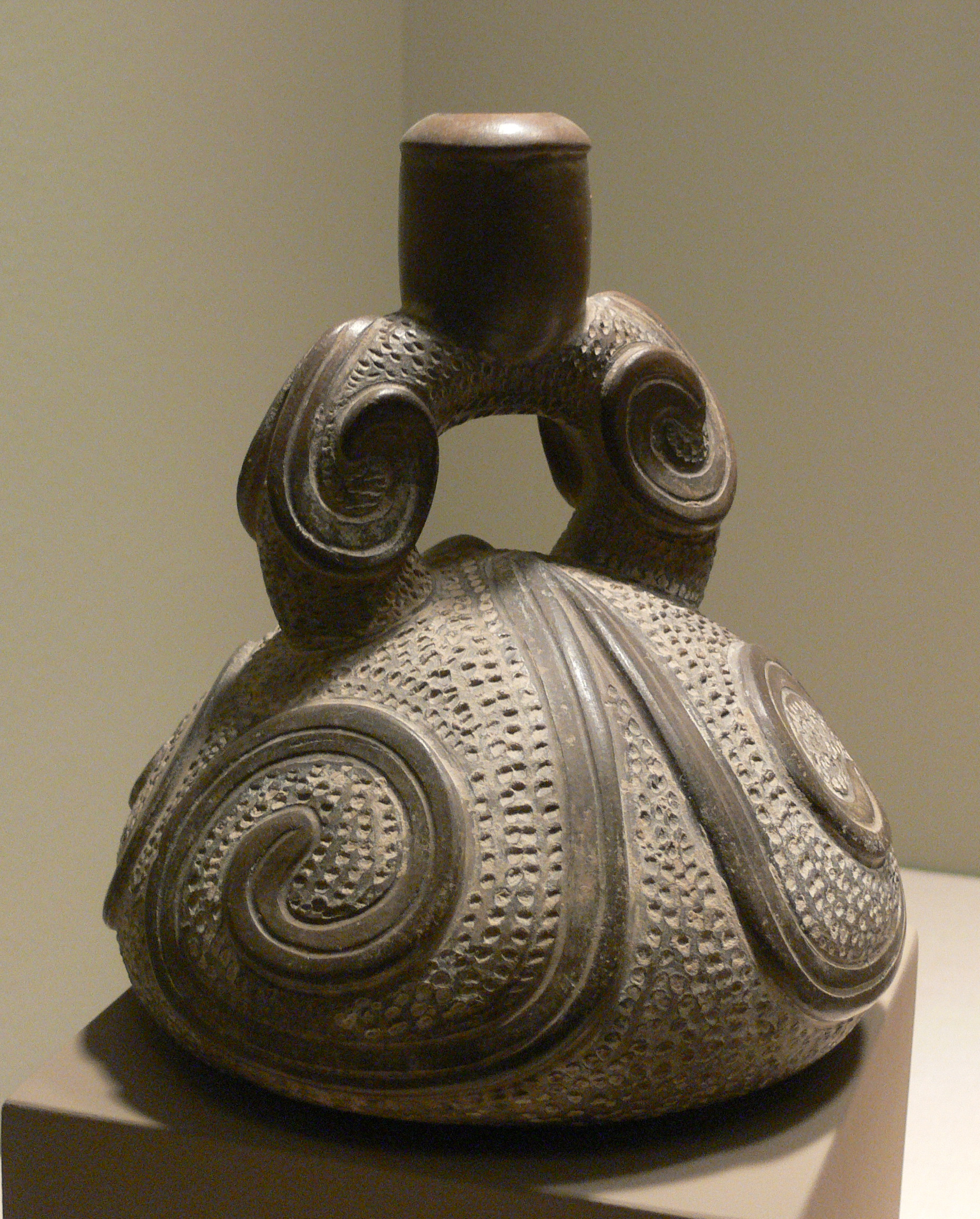
Stirrup-spout vessel with scroll ornament; ceramic; 900-200 BCE; height: 18.4 cm, diameter: 16.2 cm; Dallas Museum of Art (Dallas, Texas, USA)

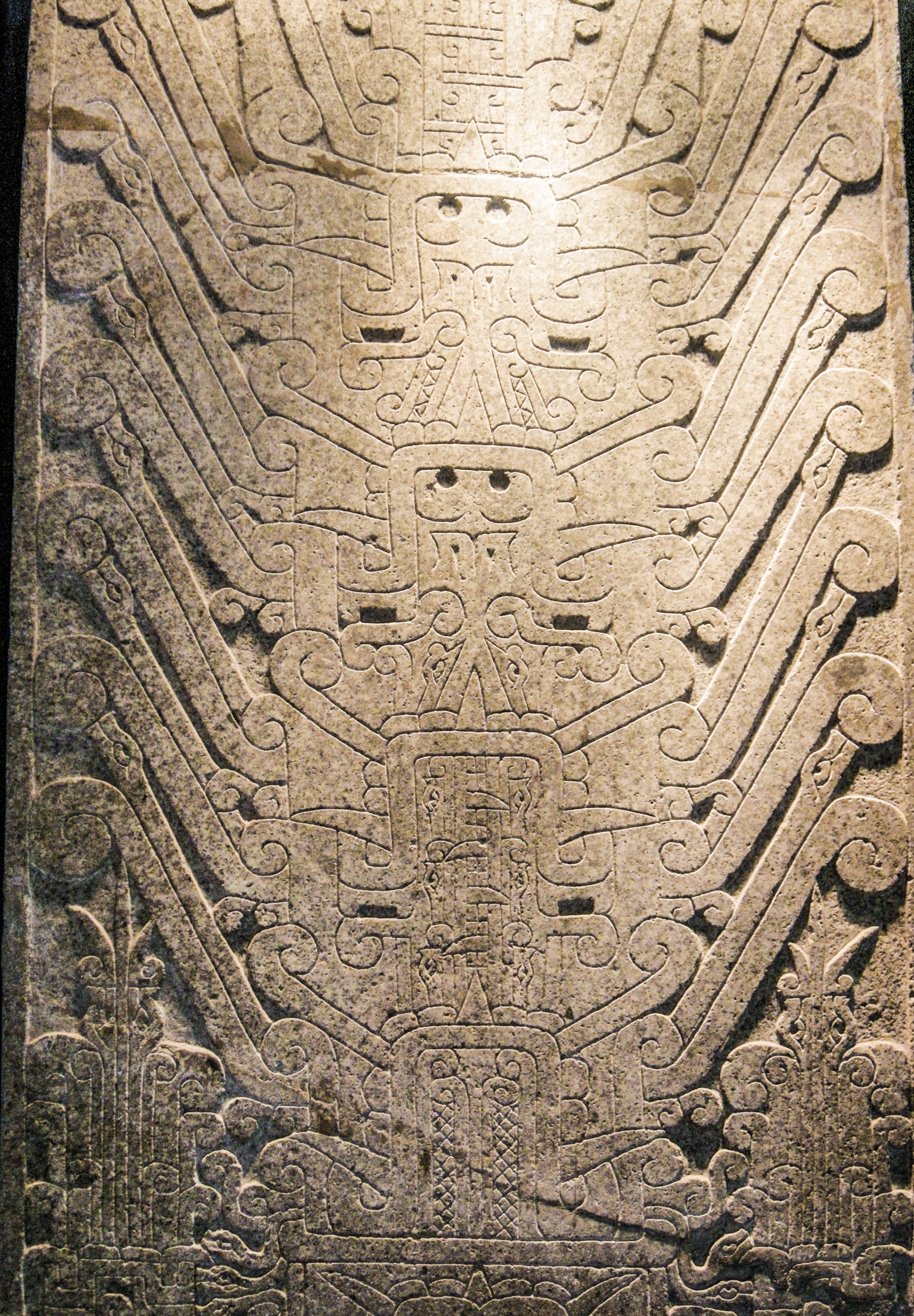
Raimondi Stela; 5th-3rd century BCE; granite; height: 1.95 (6 ft. 6 in.); Museo Nacional de Arqueología, Antropología e Historia del Perú (Lima, Peru).

==== Paracas ====
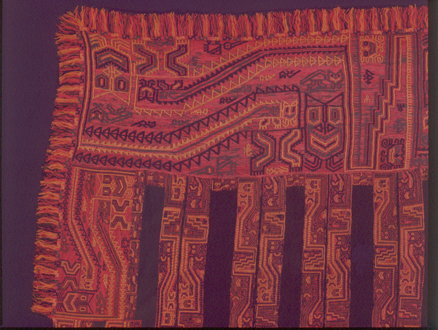
Paracas mantle 200 CE Larco Museum, Lima-Perú

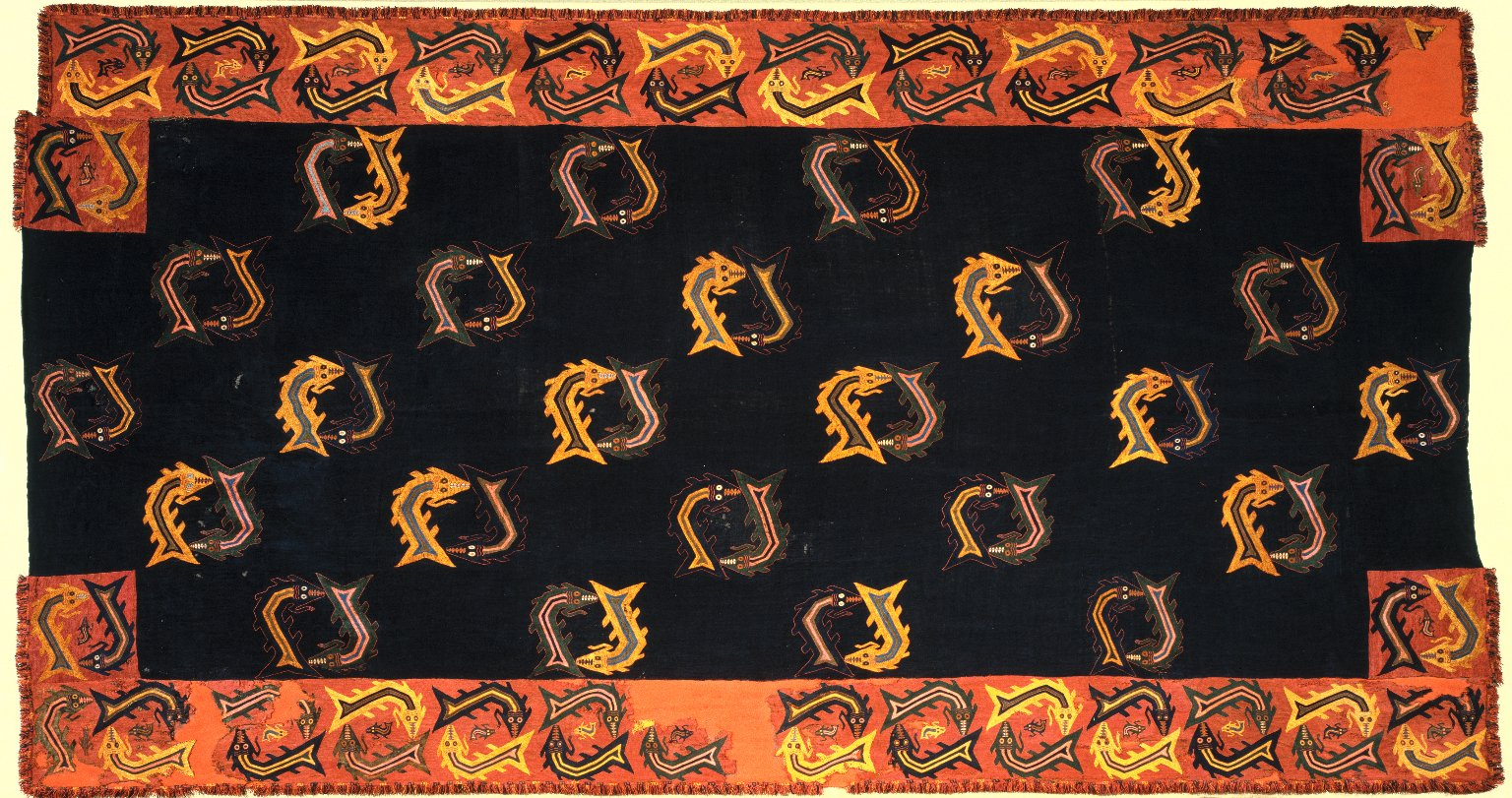
Nazca mantle from Paracas Necropolis, 0-100 . This is a "double fish" (probably sharks) design. Brooklyn Museum collections

==== Nasca ====
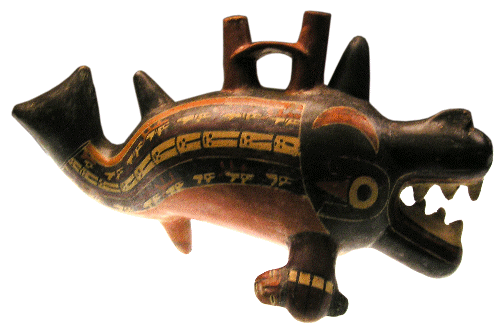
A fish-like double spout and bridge vessel from Cahuachi

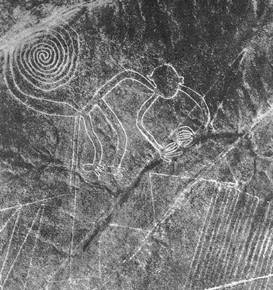
An example of the Nasca Lines

==== Moche ====
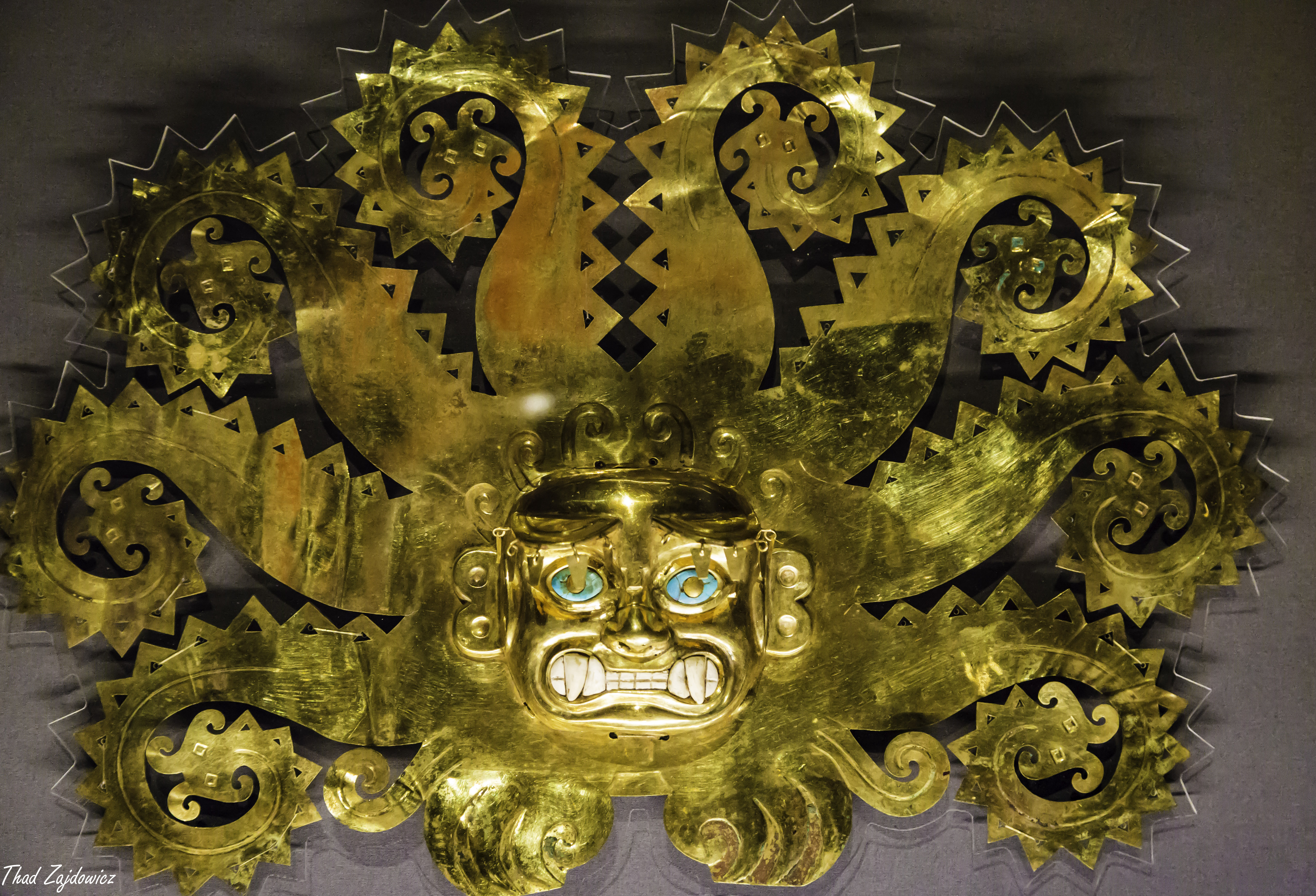
Ceremonial headdress; 300–600; gold, chrysocolla & shells

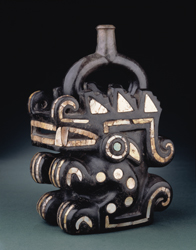
Pottery that represents a Crawling Feline; ceramic with nacre inlays; Larco Museum (Lima, Peru)

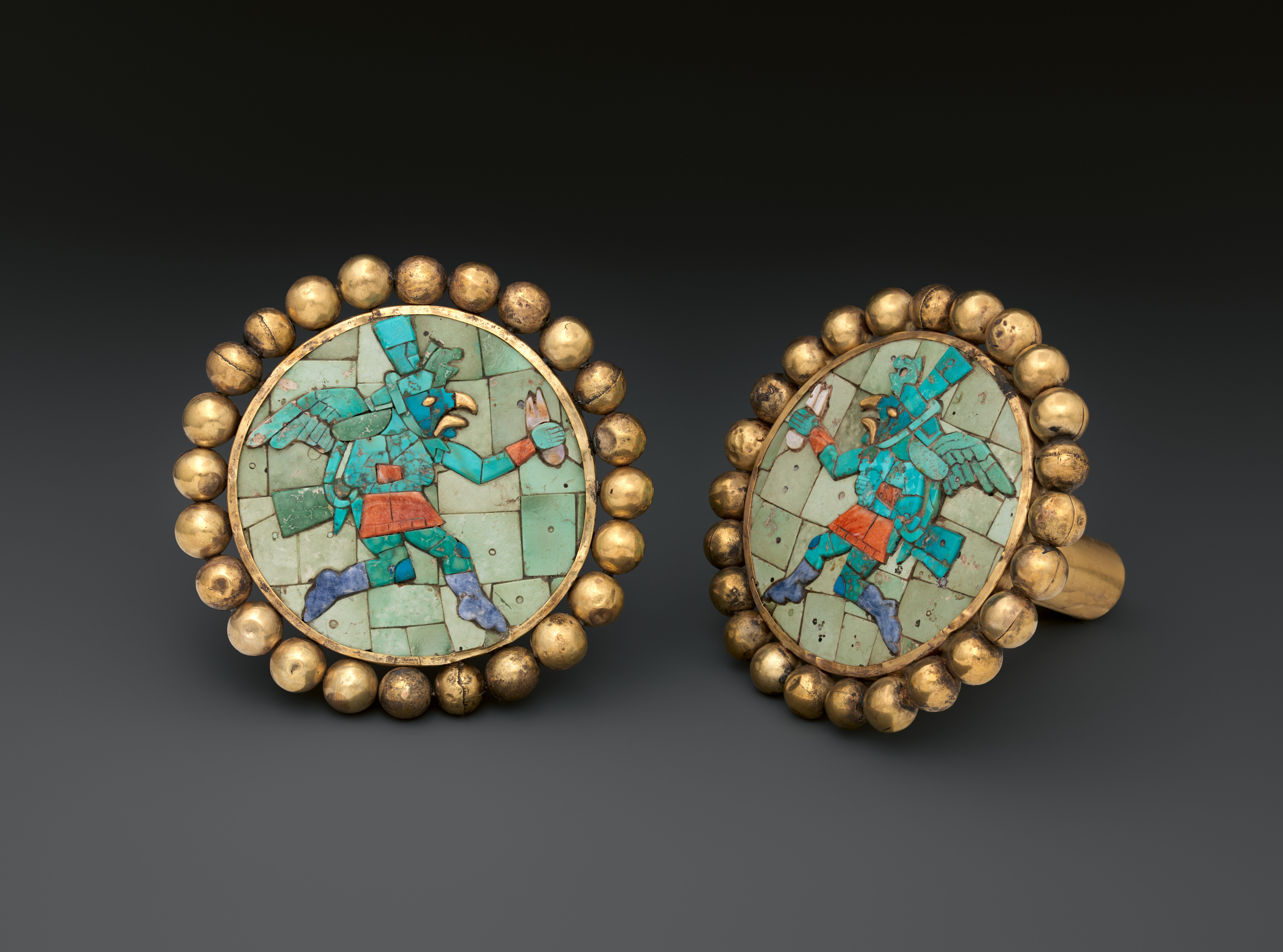
2 ear ornaments with winged runners; 5th century-8th century; gold, turquoise, sodalite & shell; Metropolitan Museum of Art (New York City)

==== Recuay ====
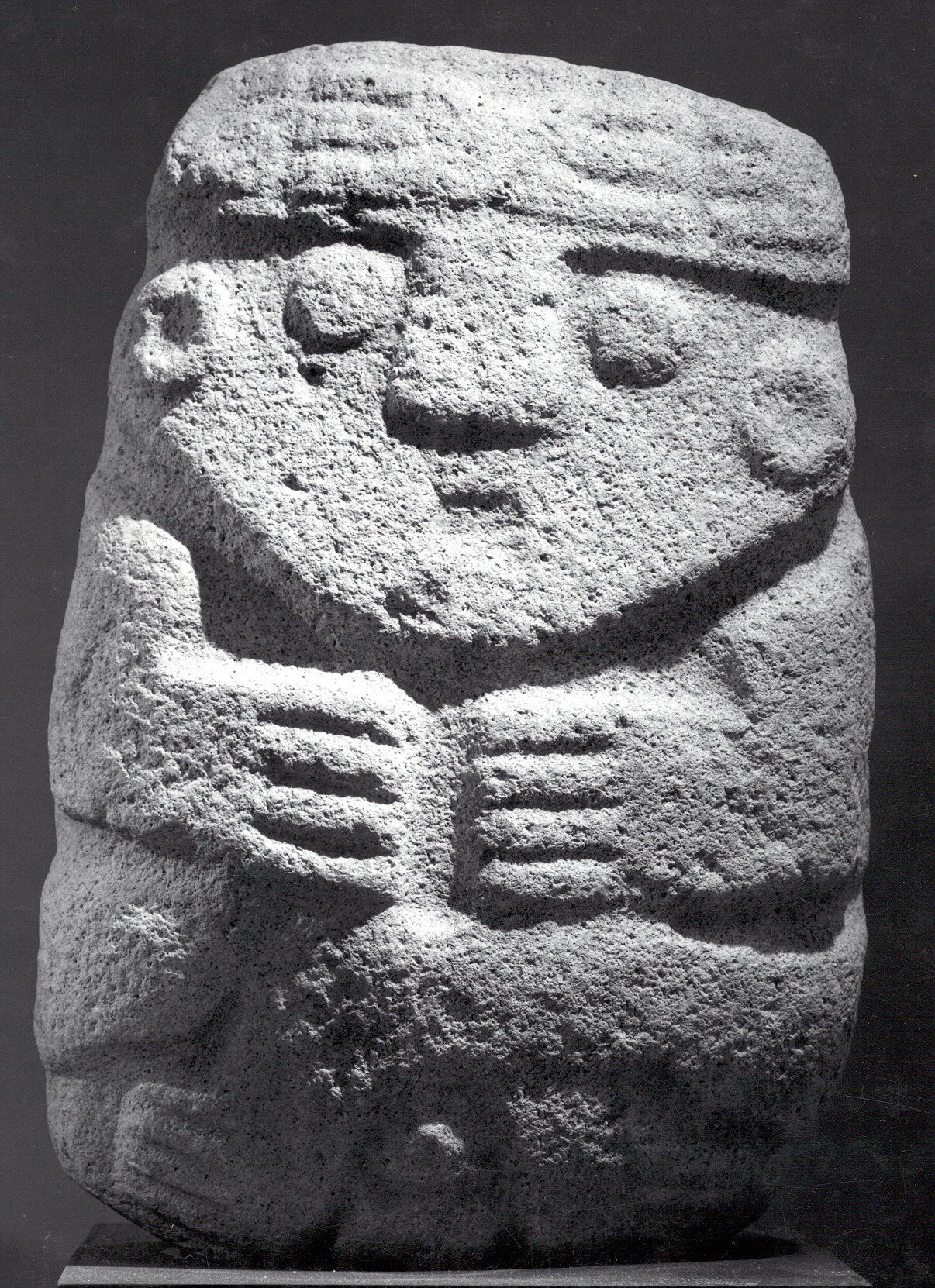
Seated figure; 2nd century BCE-3rd century CE; stone; 63.5 × 44.45 × 20.32 cm (25 × 17 1/2 × 8 in.); weight: 102.5129 kg (226 lb.); Metropolitan Museum of Art (New York City)

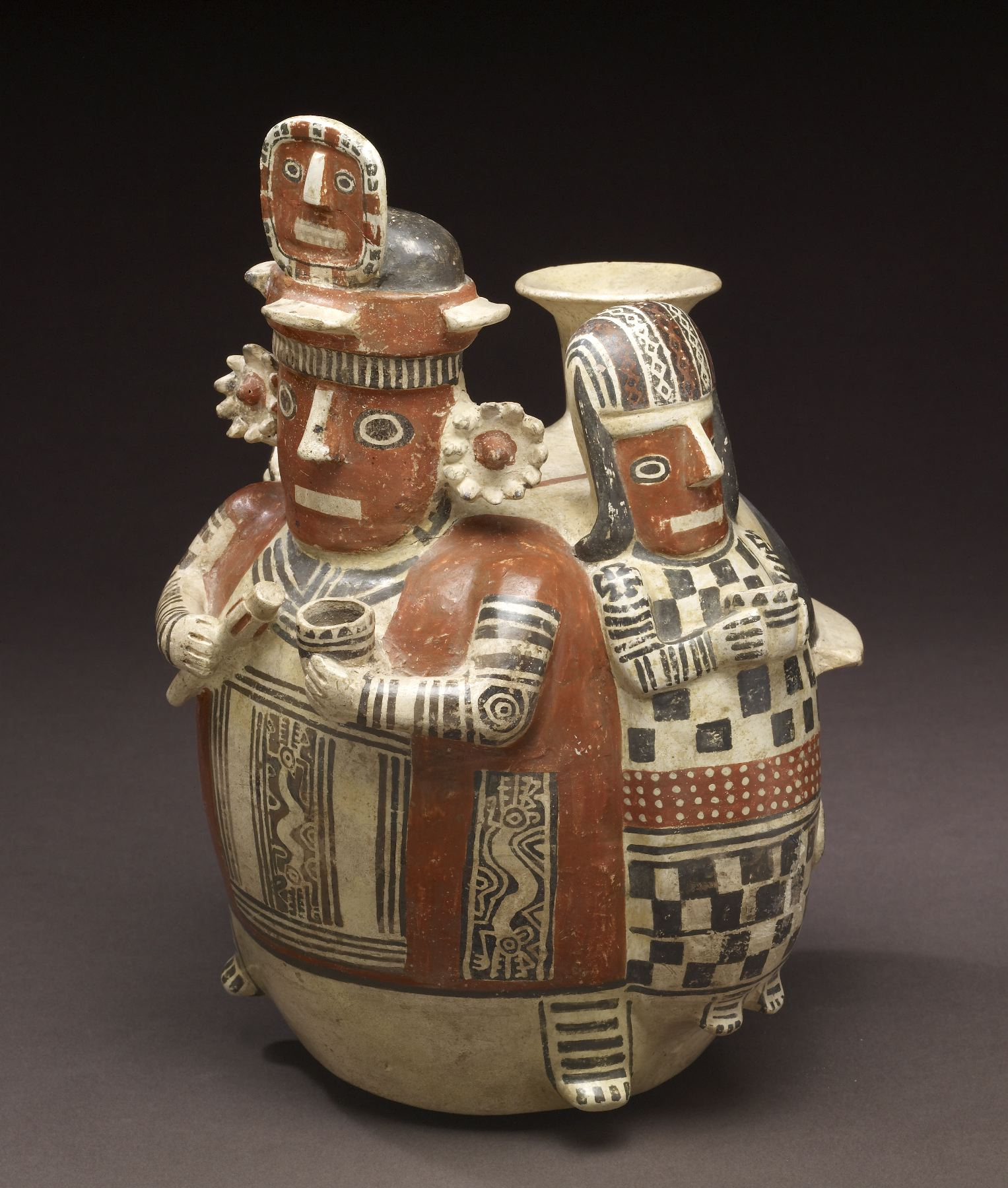
Effigy bottle; 200 BCE 500 CE; earthenware & slip paint; height: 28.2 cm (11.1 in.), diameter: 20.5 cm (8 in.); Walters Art Museum (Baltimore, USA)

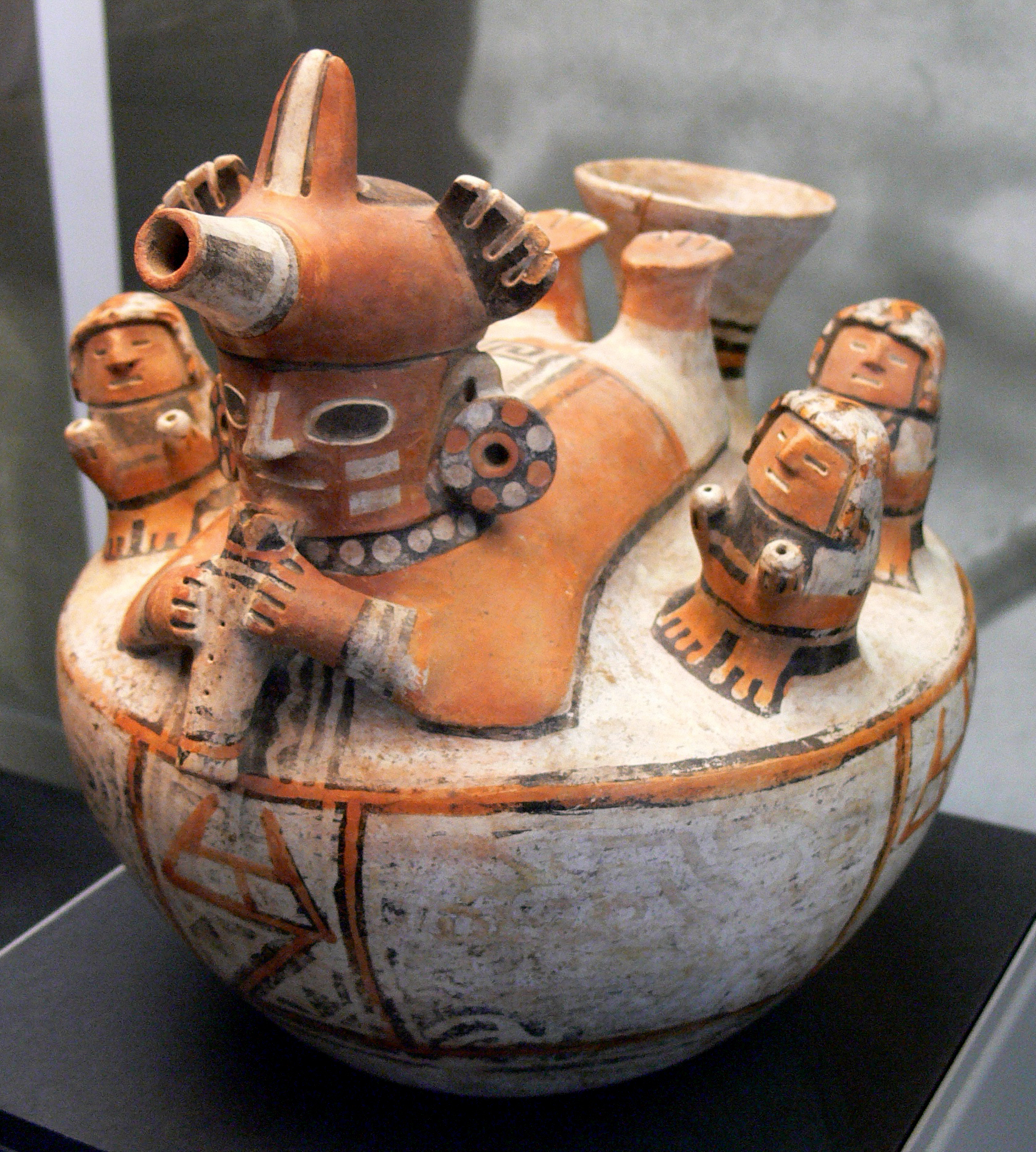
Vase with music scene; 300 BCE-300 CE painted clay; height: 21.5 cm; from northern coastal region of Peru; Kloster Allerheiligen (Schaffhausen; Switzerland)

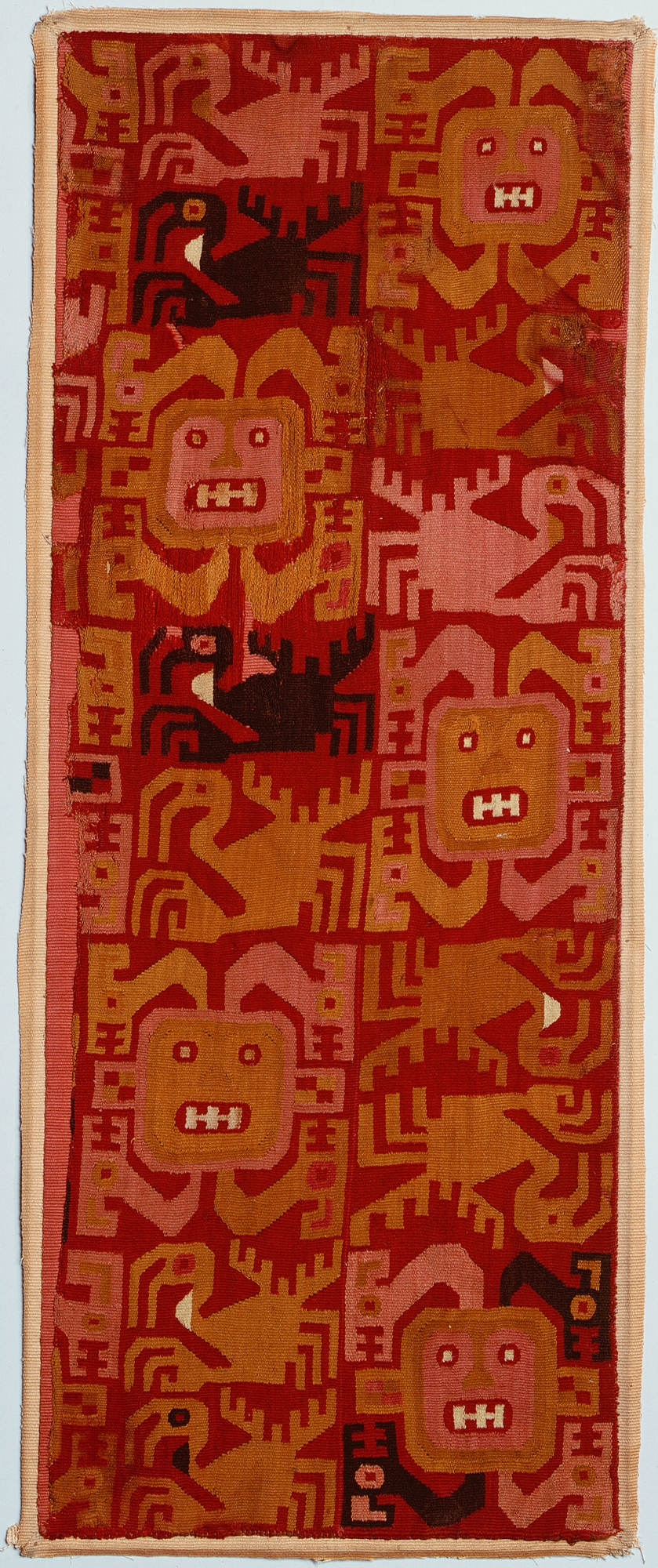
Textile fragment; 4th–6th century; camelid hair; overall: 33.02 x 82.55 cm (13 × 32 1/2 in.); Metropolitan Museum of Art

==== Tolita ====
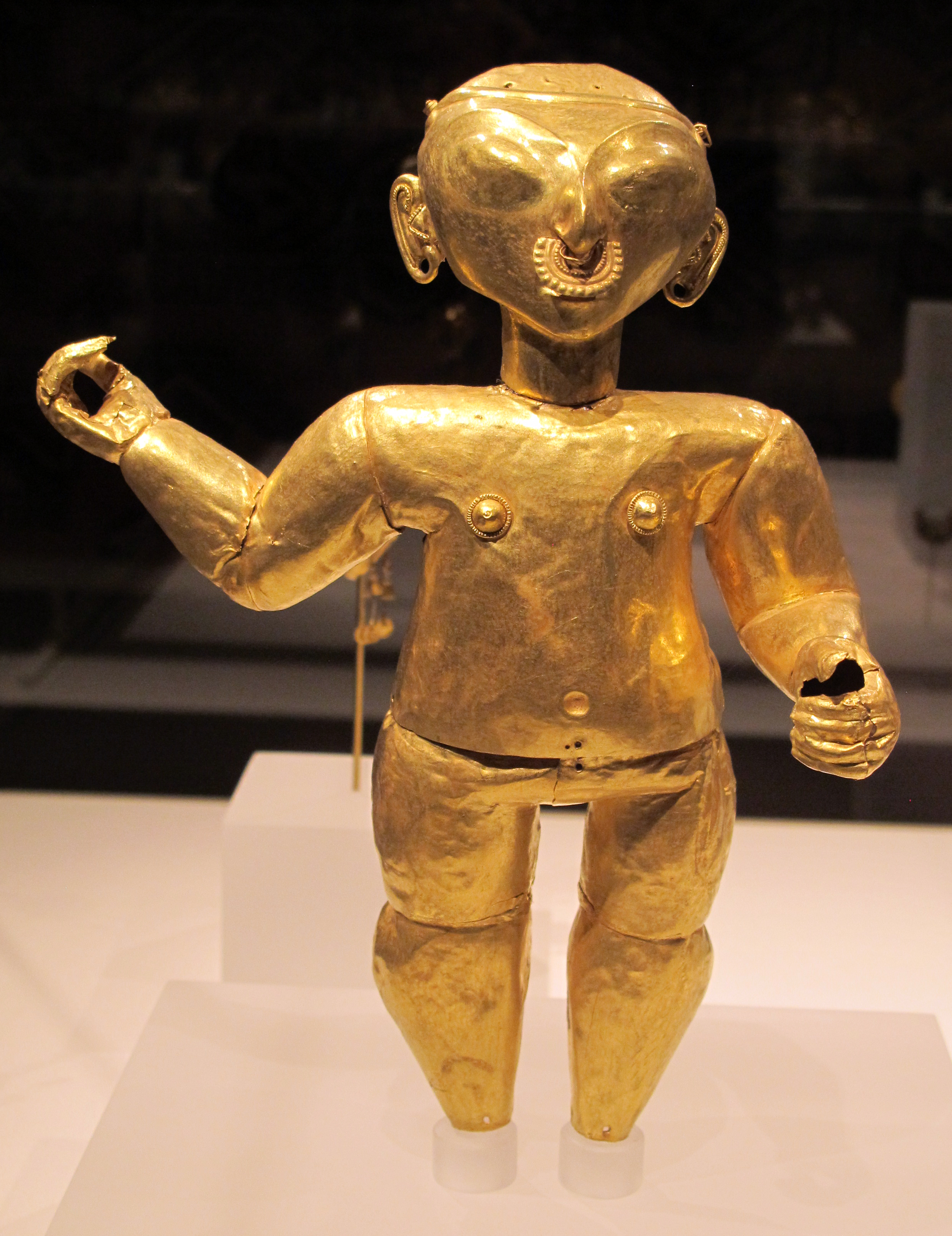
Standing figure; 1st century BCE-1st century CE; emossed gold; height: 22.9 cm (9 in.); Metropolitan Museum of Art

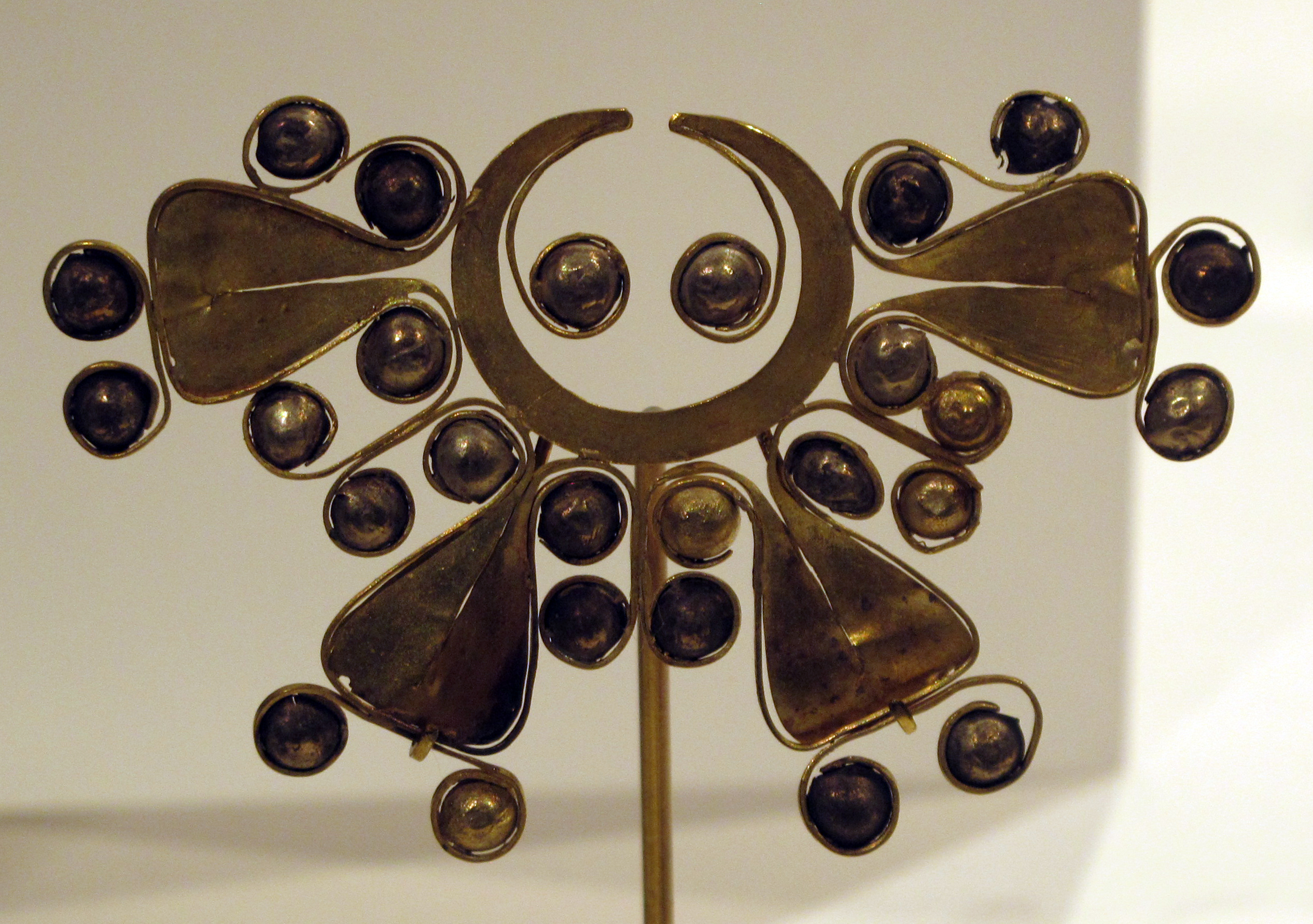
Nose-ornament; 1st-5th century; gold and embossed silver; Metropolitan Museum of Art

==== Wari ====
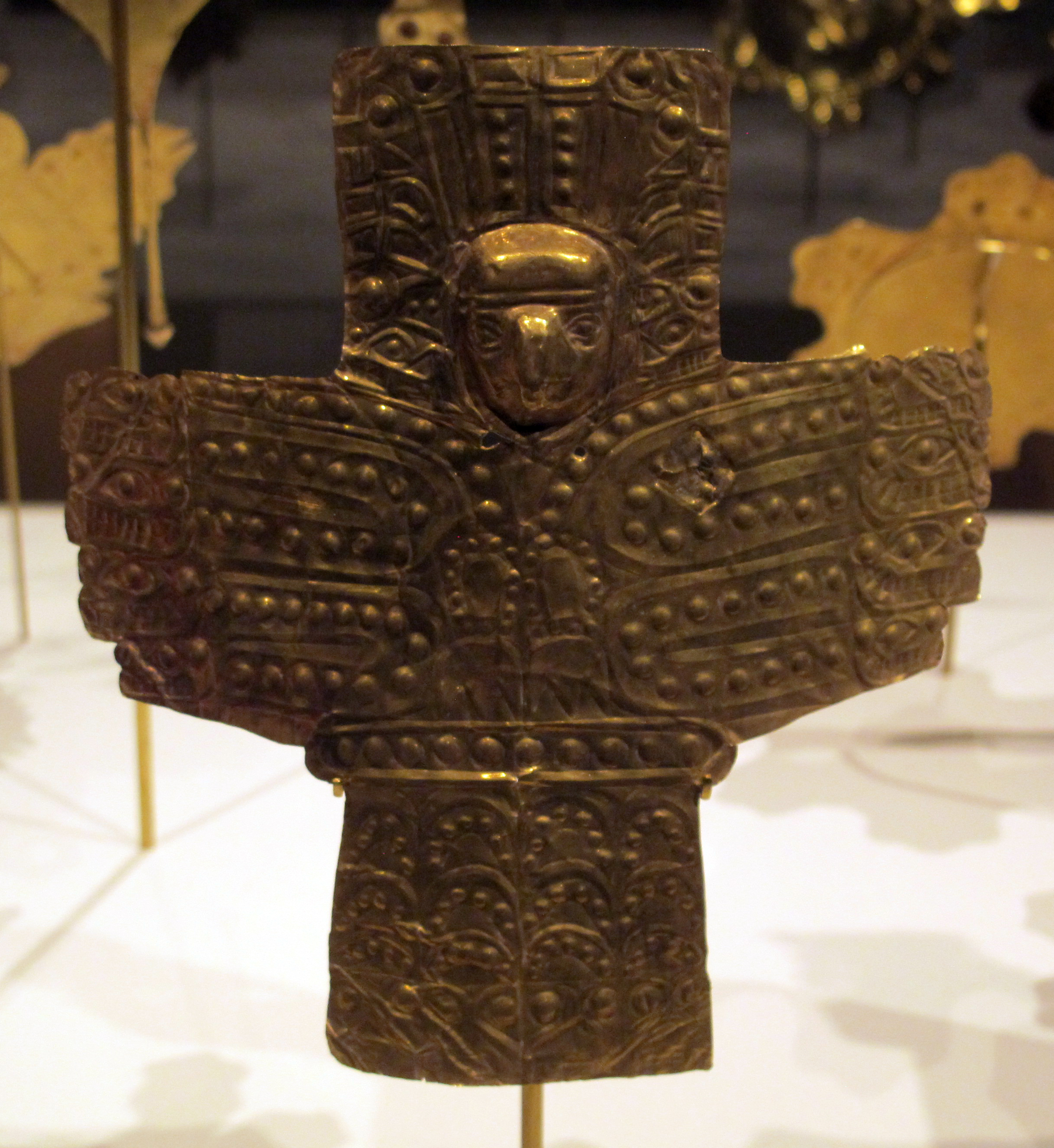
Ornament in the shape of a bird; 6th-10th century; embossed gold; Metropolitan Museum of Art (New York City)

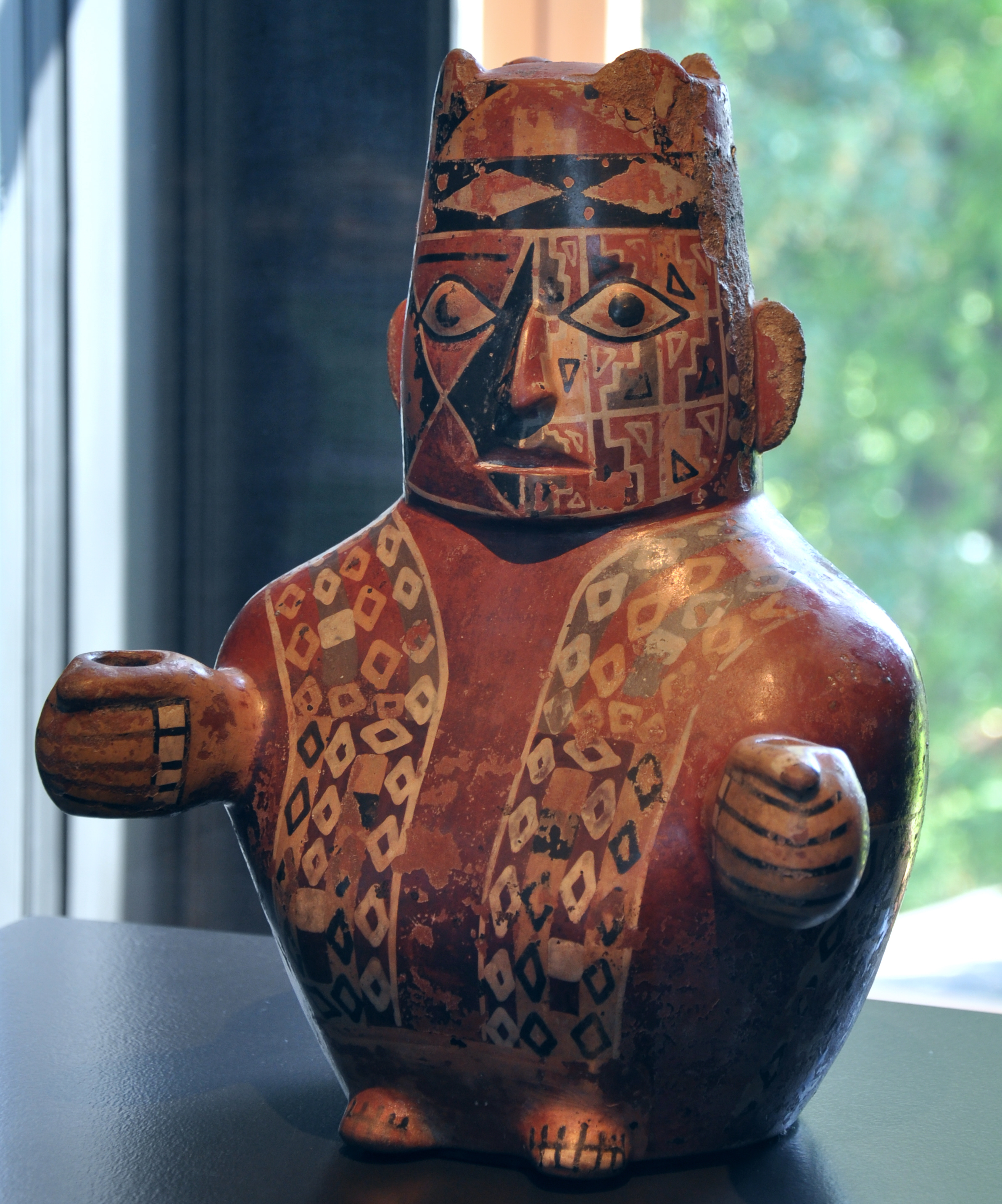
Anthropomorphic figure; 7th-10th century; burned clay; from Mantaro Valley; Museum Rietberg (Zürich, Switzerland)

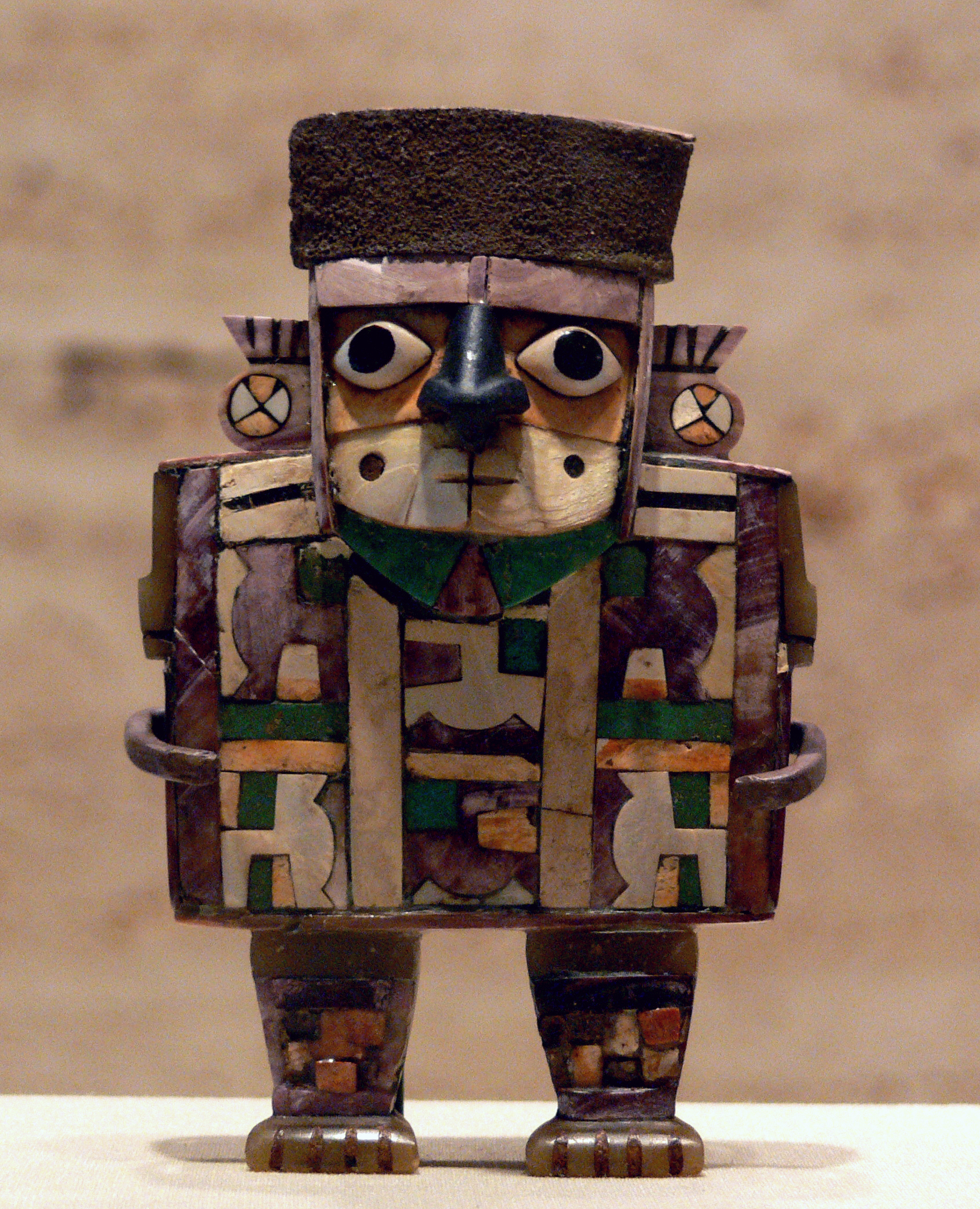
Mozaic figure; 7th–11th century; wood with shell-and-stone inlay & silver; 10.2 x 6.4 x 2.6 cm; from the Wari Empire; Kimbell Art Museum (Fort Worth, Texas, USA)

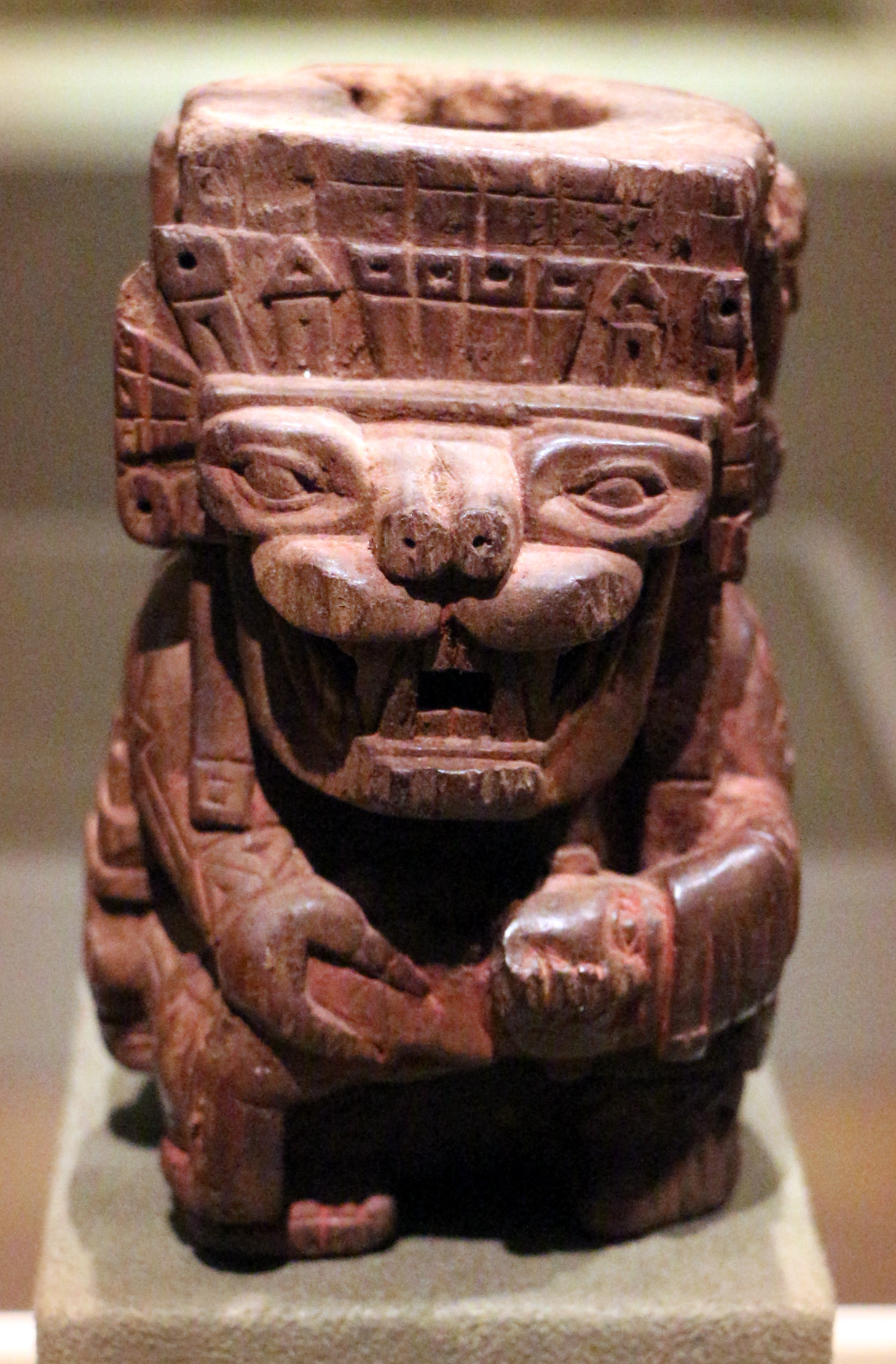
Sacrificer-shaped container; circa 769–887; wood & cinnabar; Cleveland Museum of Art (USA)

==== Lambayeque/Sican ====
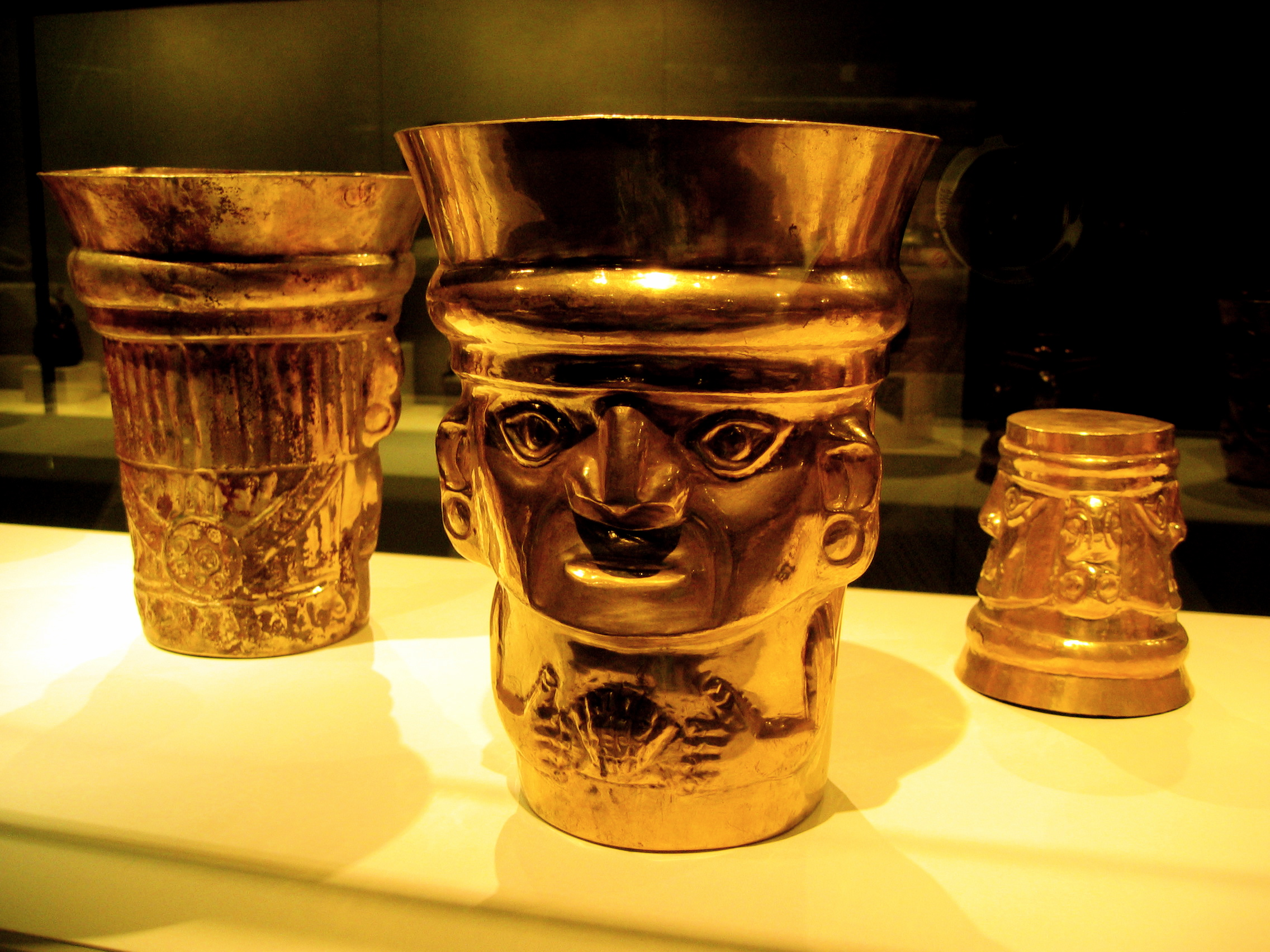
Beaker cups; 9th-11th century; gold; Metropolitan Museum of Art (New York City)

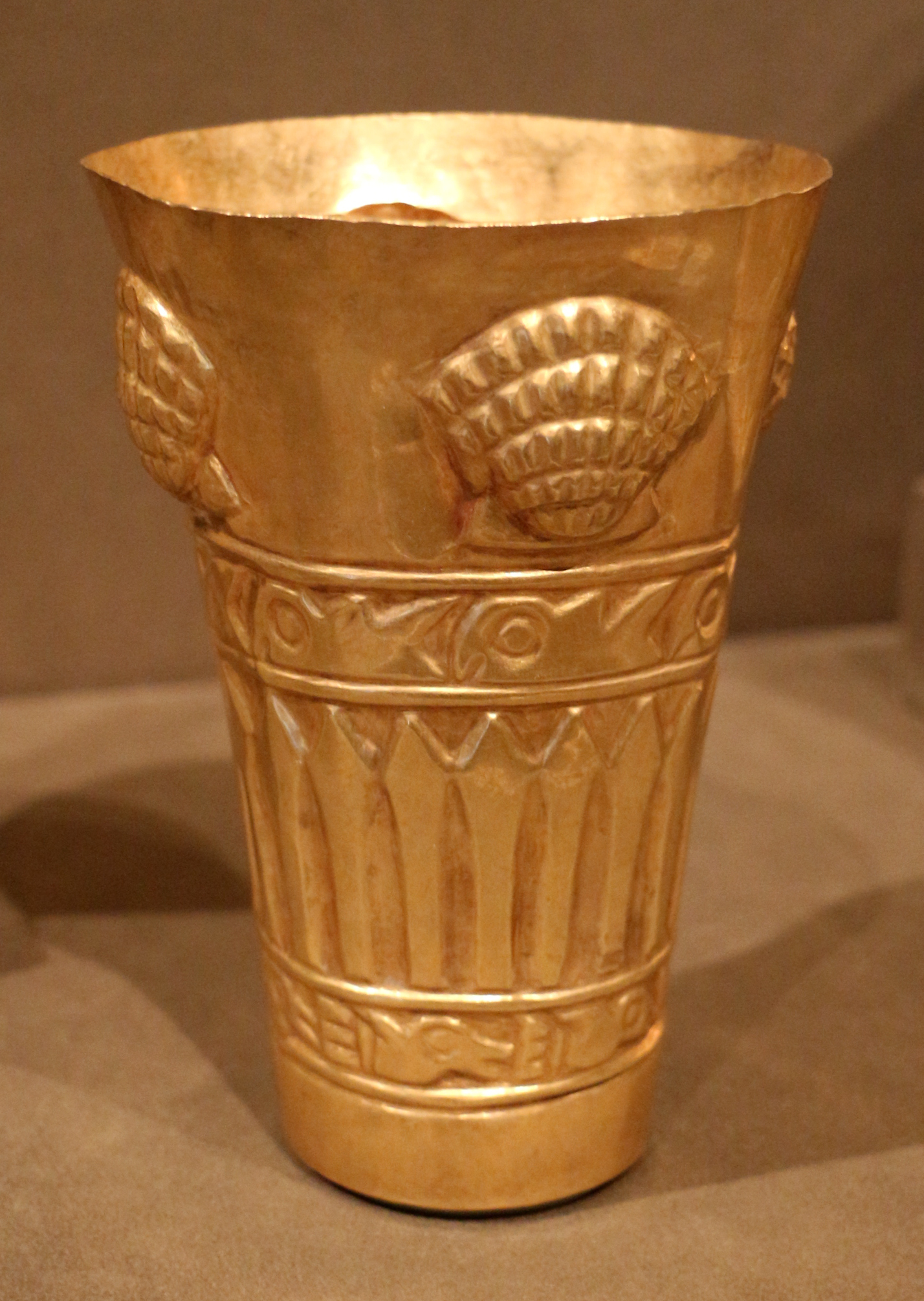
Cup; 900–1100; Art Institute of Chicago (USA)

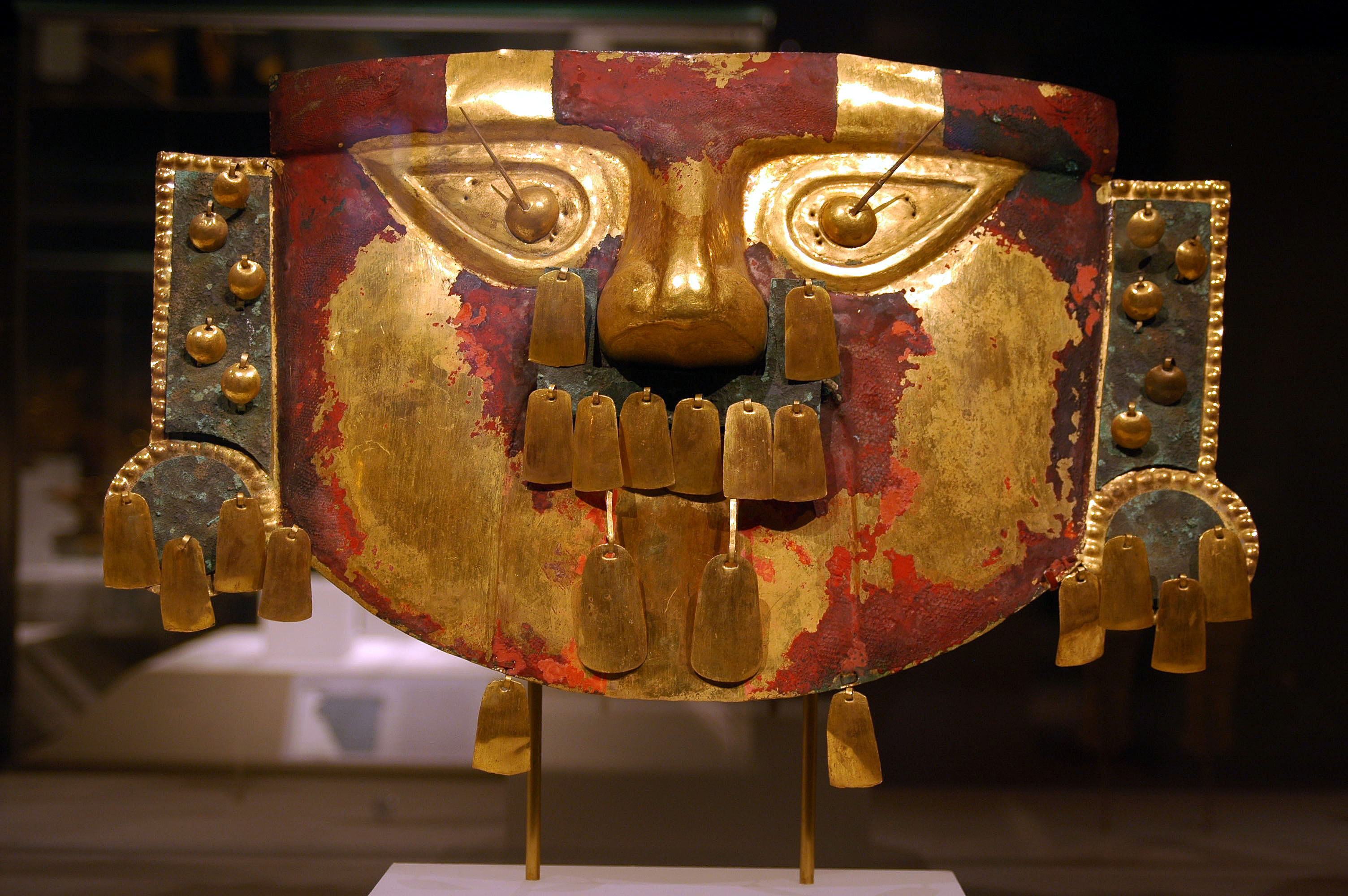
Sican headdress mask; 10th-11th century; gold, silver & paint; height: 29.2 cm (11 1/2 in.); Metropolitan Museum of Art

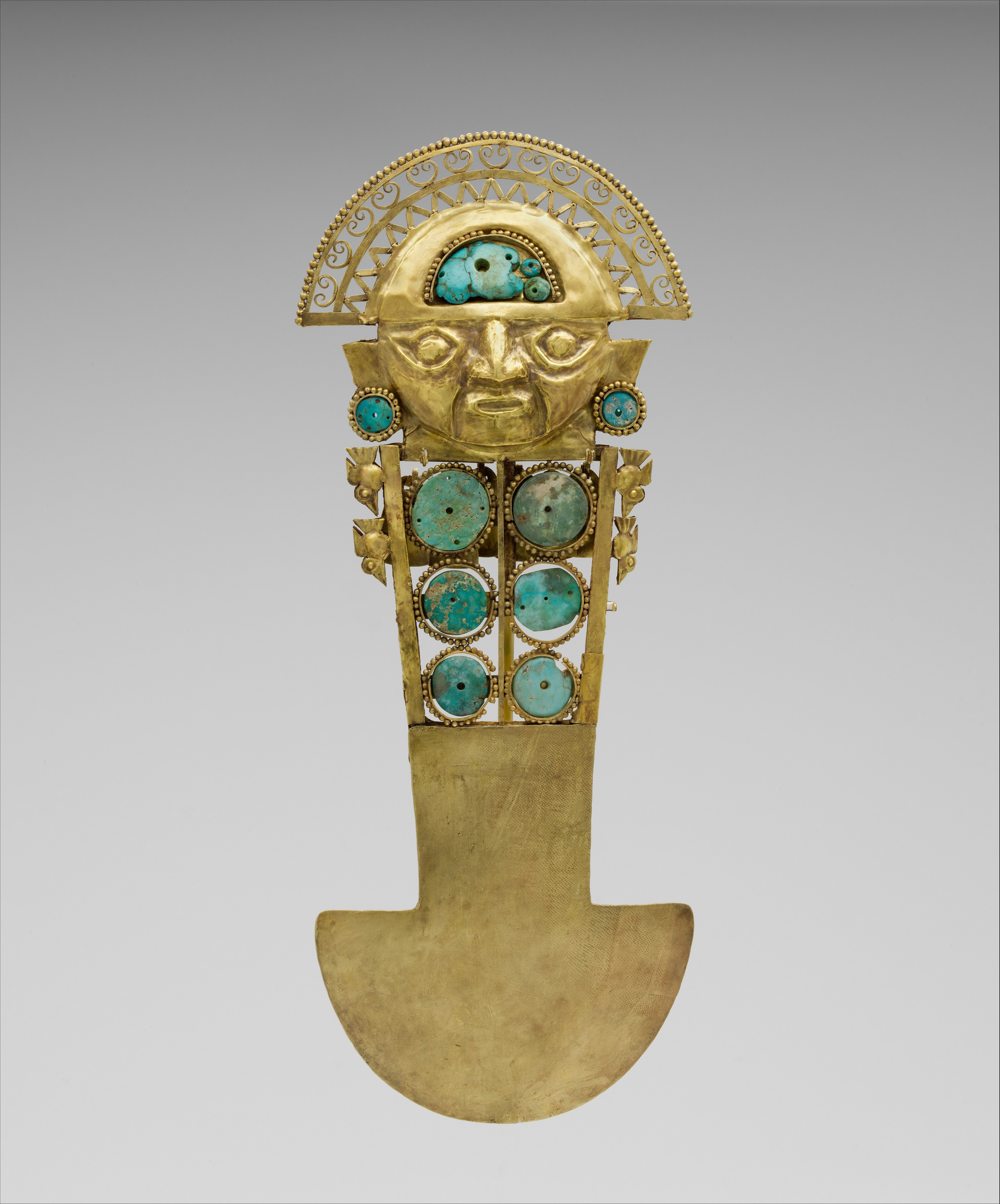
Ceremonial knife (tumi); 10th-13th century; gold, turquoise, greenstone & shell; height: 33 cm (1 ft. 1 in.); Metropolitan Museum of Art

==== Tiwanaku ====
Closeup of carved stone tenon-head embedded in wall of Tiwanaku's Semi-subterranean Temple

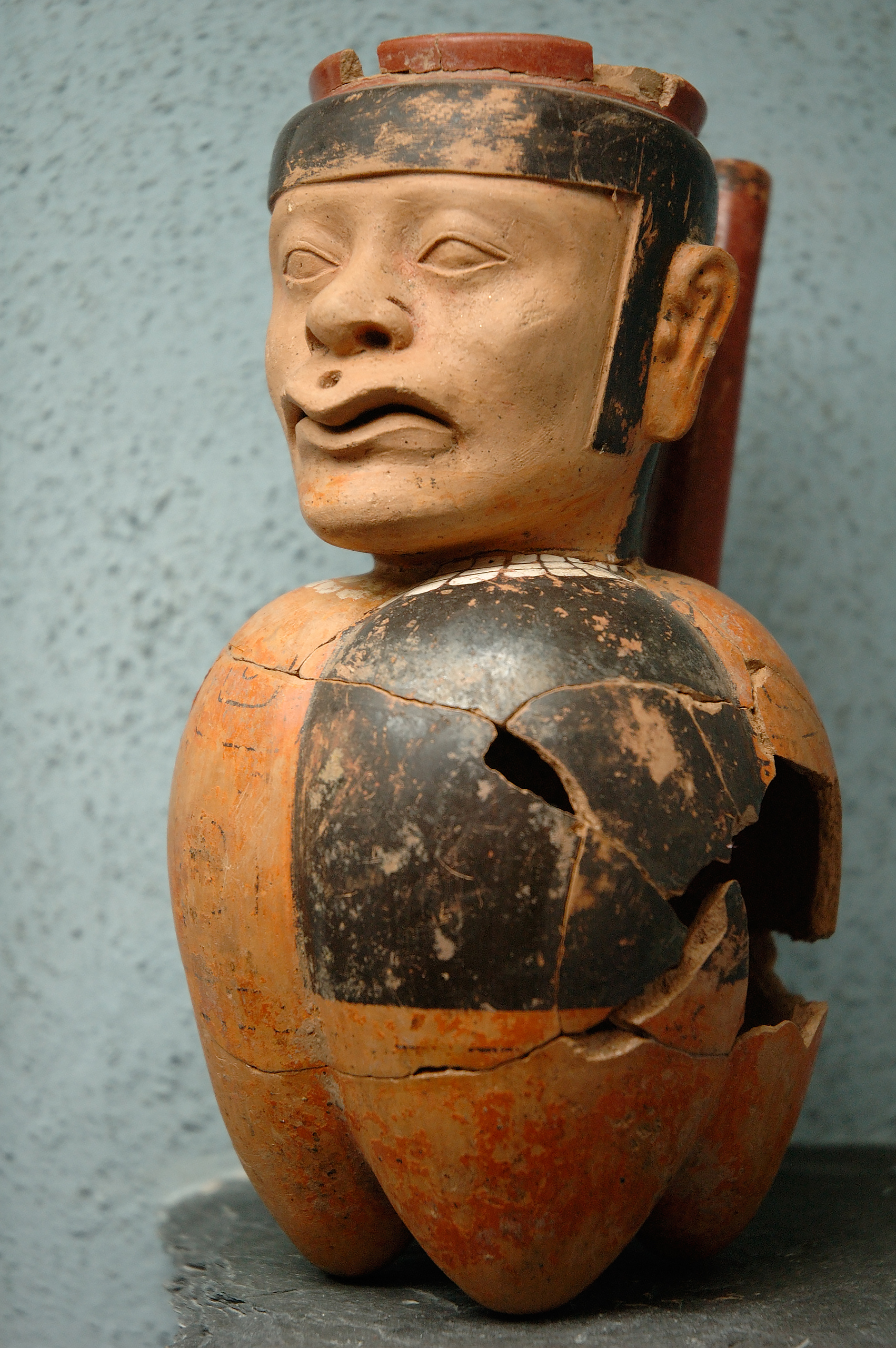
Anthropomorphic receptacle

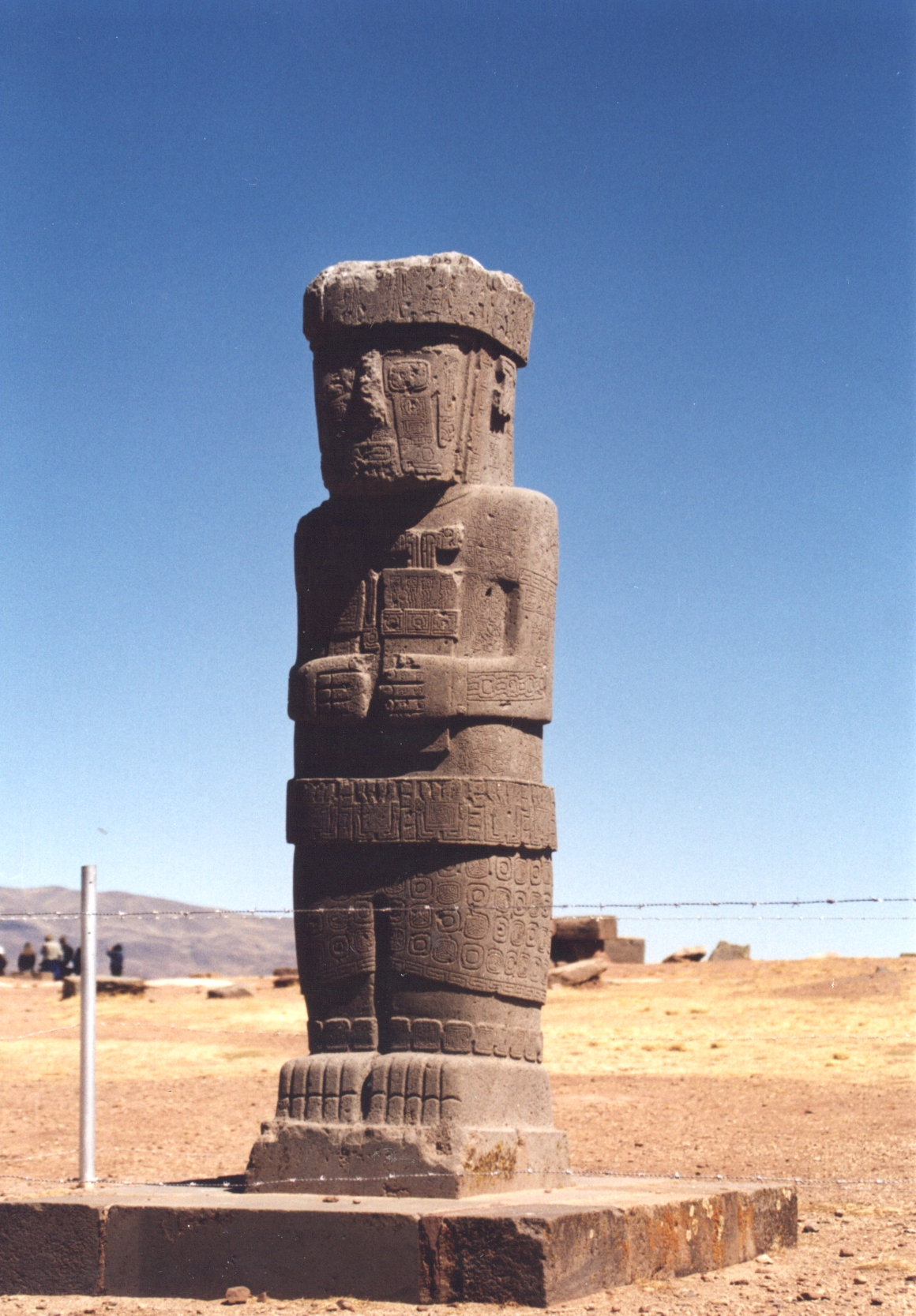
Ponce Monolith in the sunken courtyard of the Tiwanaku's Kalasasaya temple

==== Capulí ====
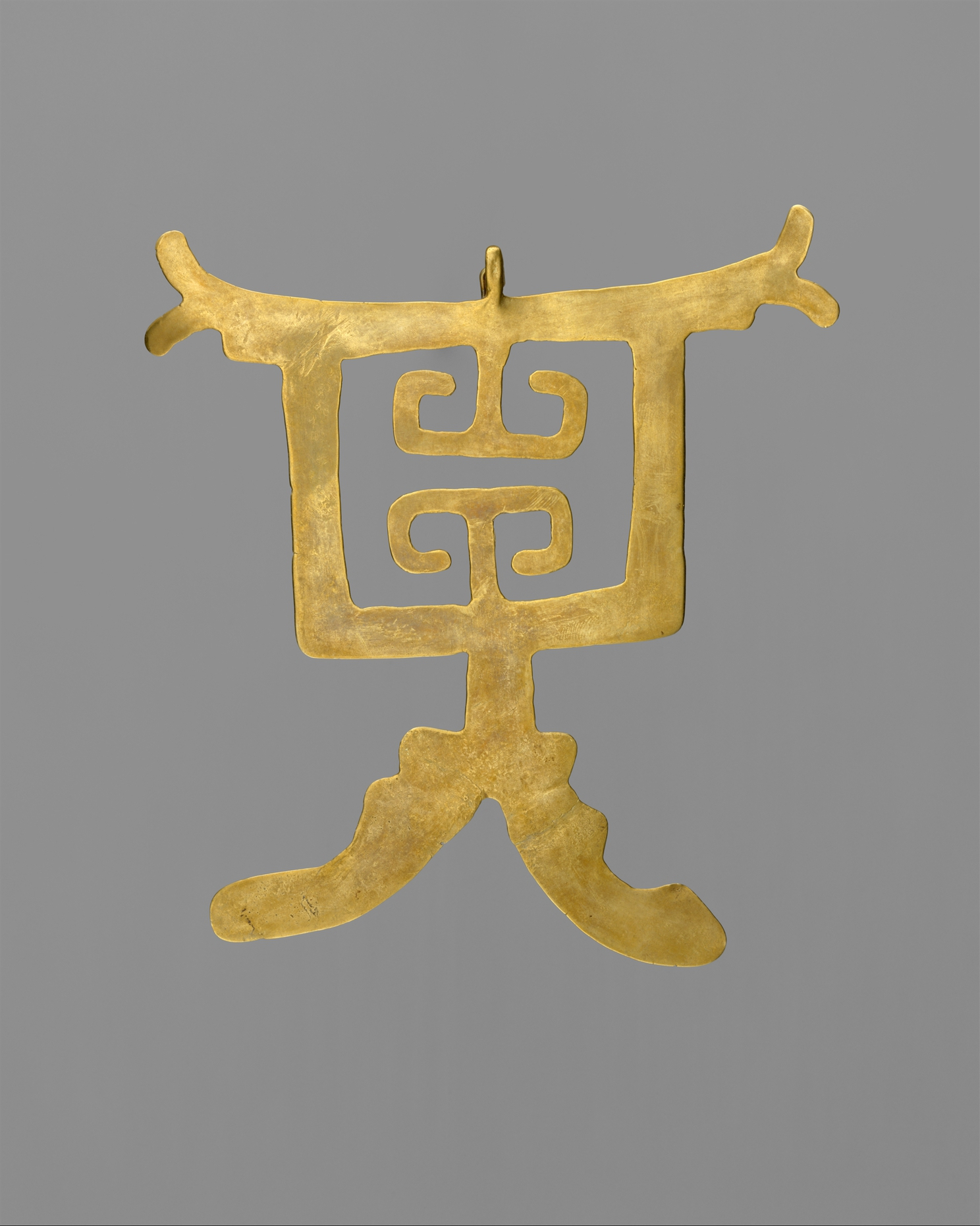
Pendant; 4th–10th century; gold; height: 14.6 cm (5 3/4 in.); Metropolitan Museum of Art (New York City)

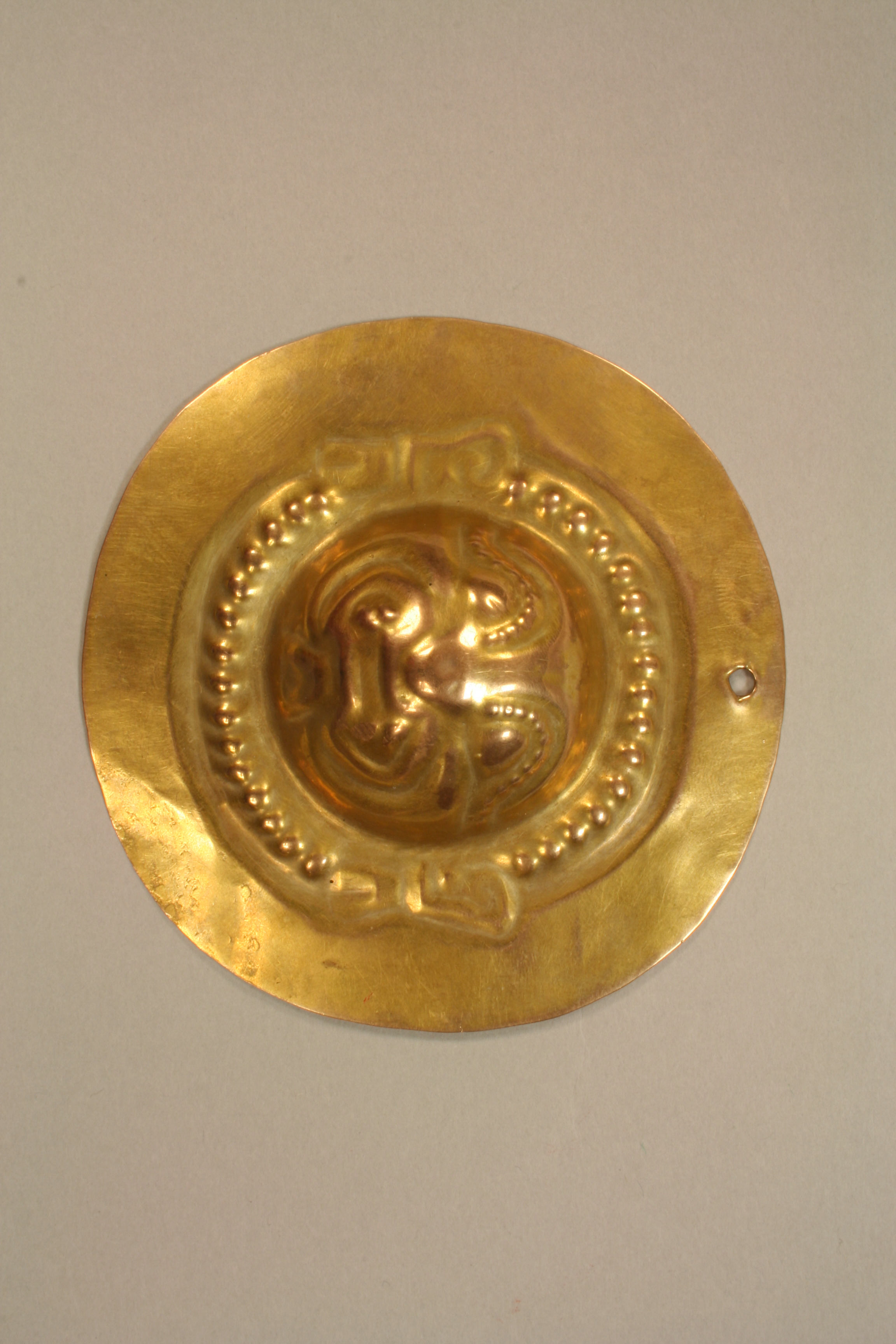
Face-shaped plaque; 7th–12th century; gold; diameter: 1.9 cm (3 5/8 in.); Metropolitan Museum of Art

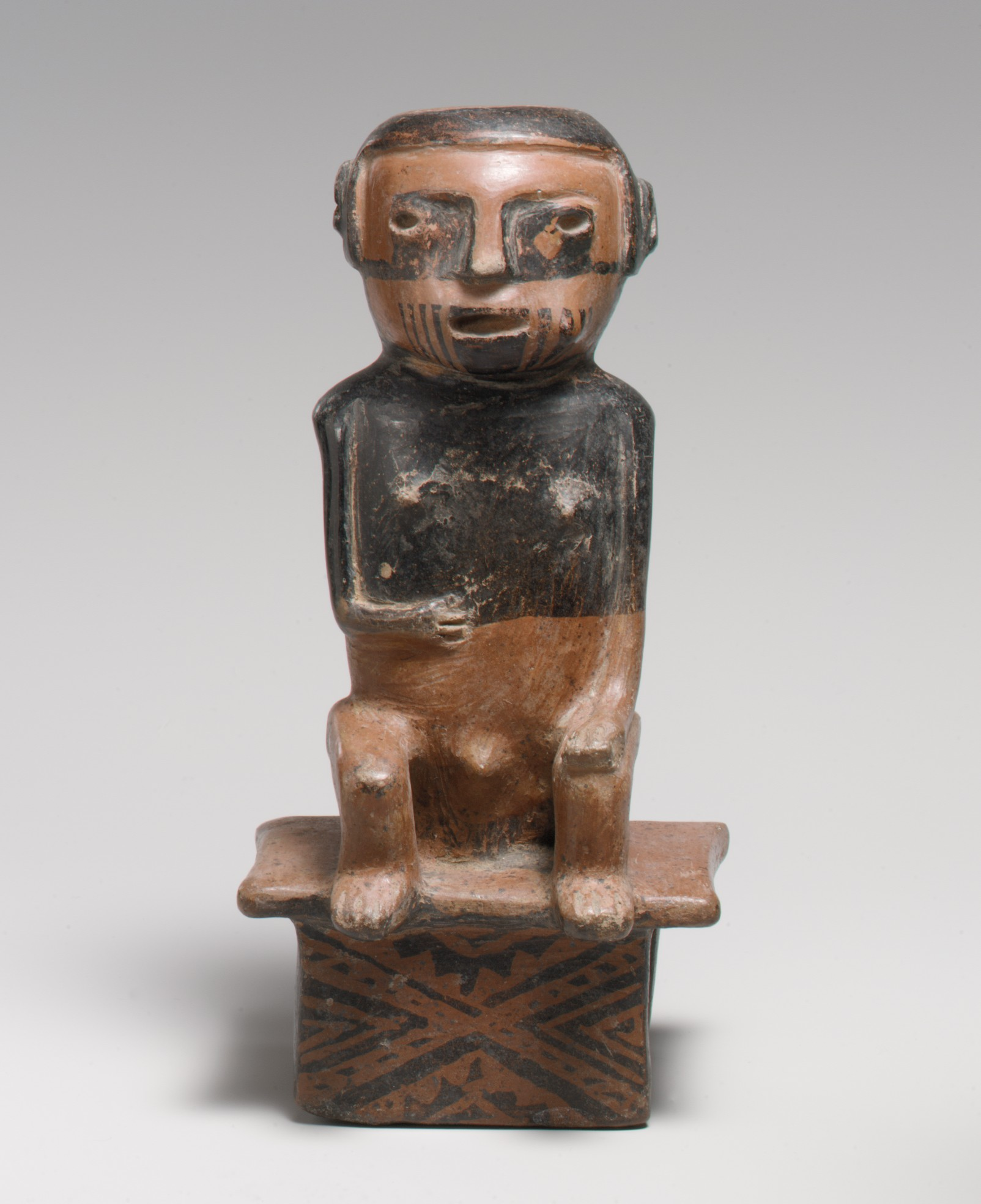
Male figure-shaped coca chewer on bench; 9th–15th century; ceramic; height: 21.6 cm (8 1/2 in.), width: 10.2 cm (4 in.); Metropolitan Museum of Art

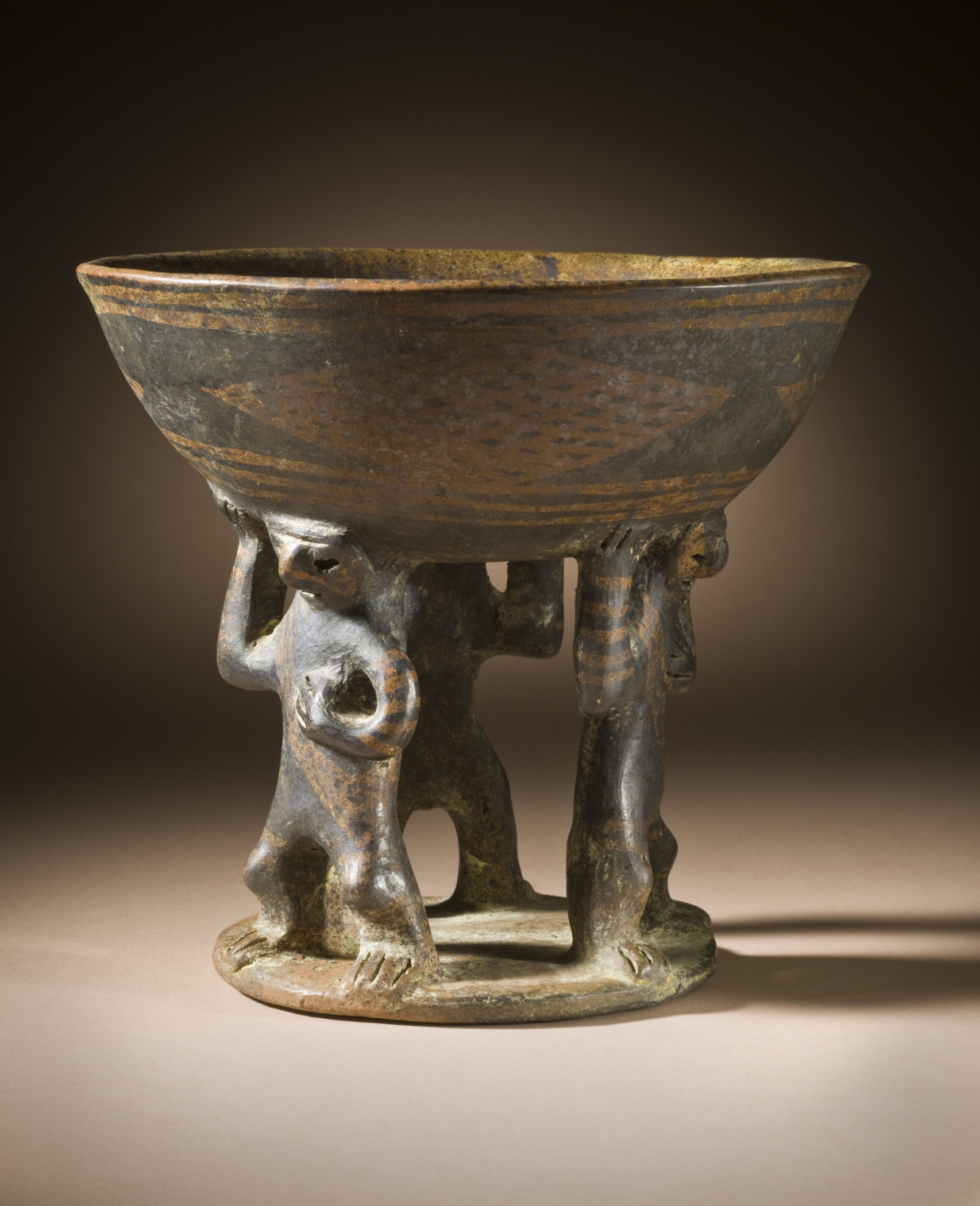
Bowl supported by 3 figures; 850–1500; resist-painted ceramic; height: 28.58 cm (11 1/4 in.), diameter of the bowl: 19.69 cm (7 3/4 in.); from Colombia; Los Angeles County Museum of Art (USA)

==== Chimú empire ====
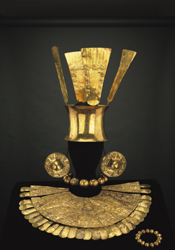
Chimú gold apparel, 1300 CE, Larco Museum, Lima, Perú

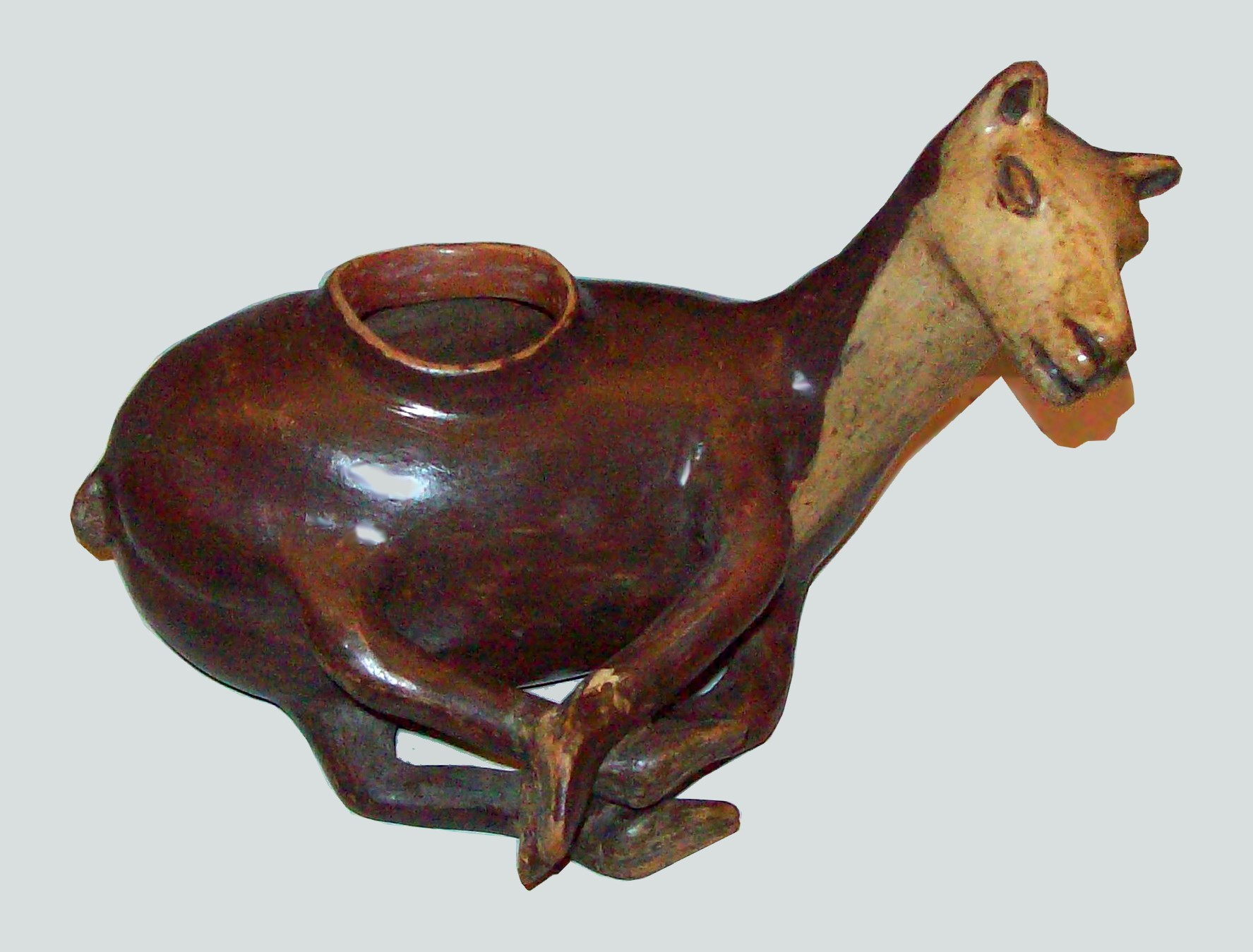
Ceramic llama vessel, 1100–1400 CE, Museo de América, Madrid, Spain

Chimu mantle, Late Intermediate Period, 1000–1476 CE, featuring pelicans and tuna

==== Chancay ====
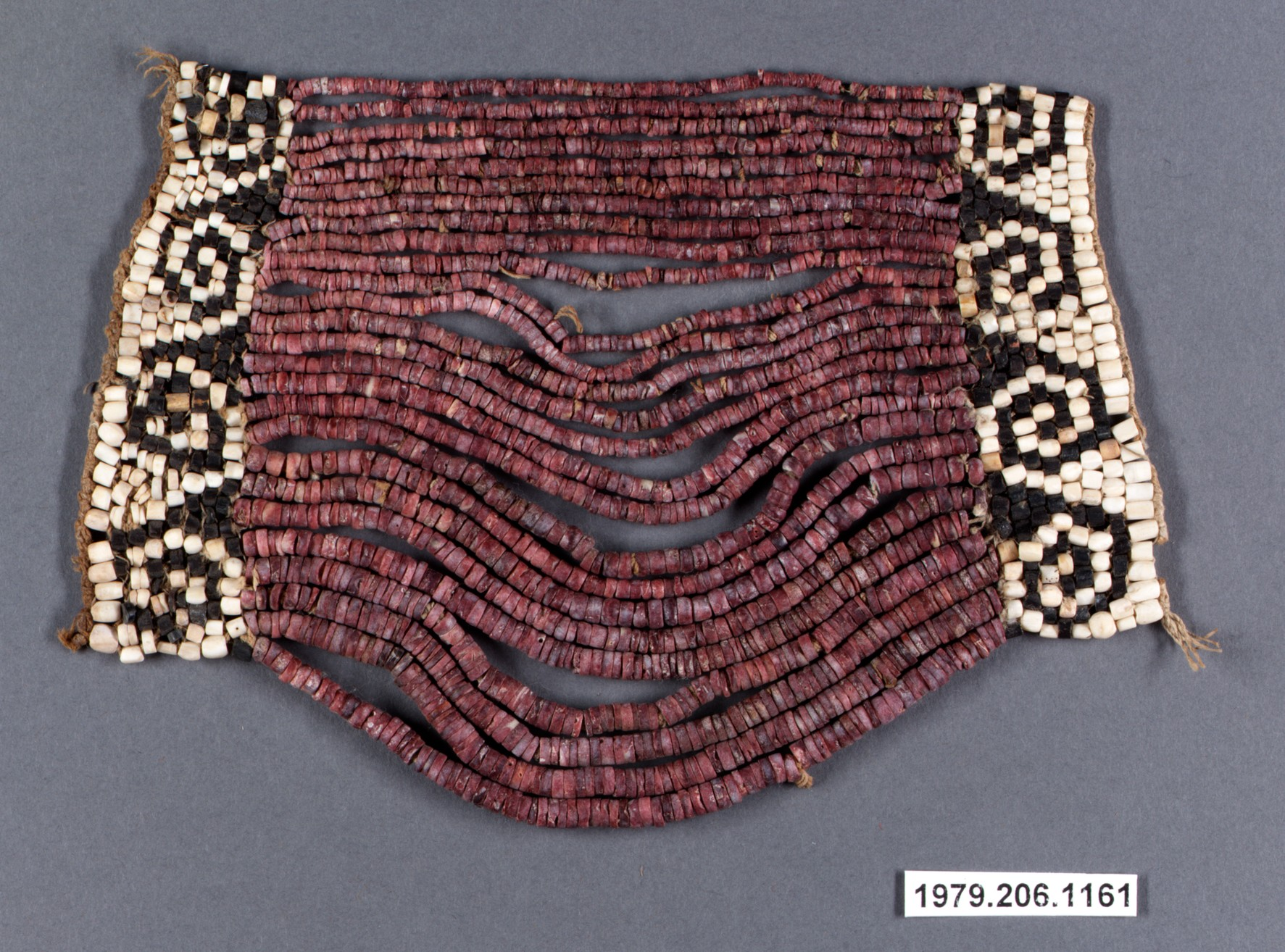
Beaded wrist ornament, ca. 1100–1399 CE, hand-ground shell beads, cordage, 4.25 in., Metropolitan Museum of Art

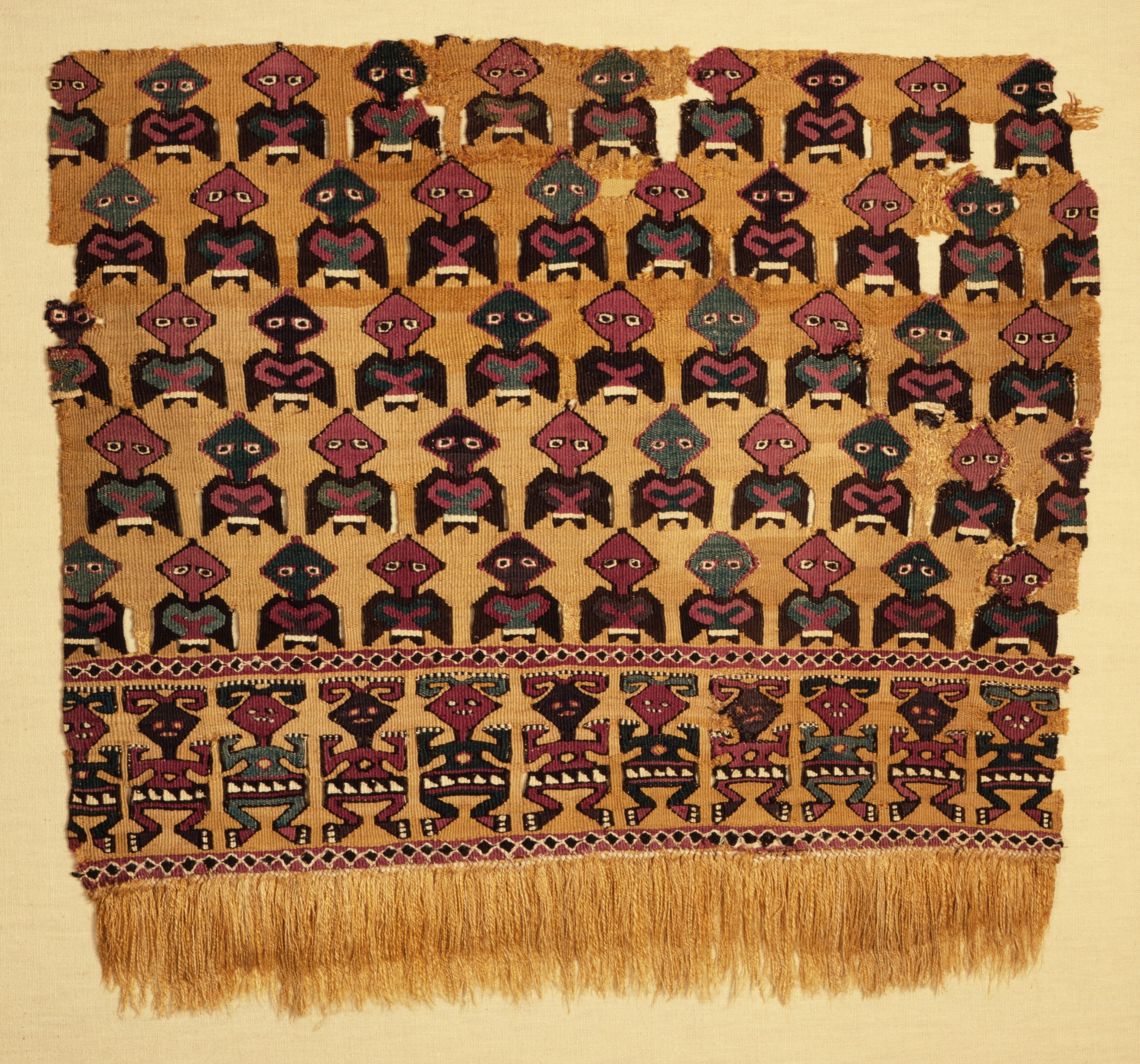
Fragment ofslit tapestry with eccentric weave and applied fringe, 1000–1470, camelid fiber and cotton, 16 3/4 x 18 in., Los Angeles County Museum of Art

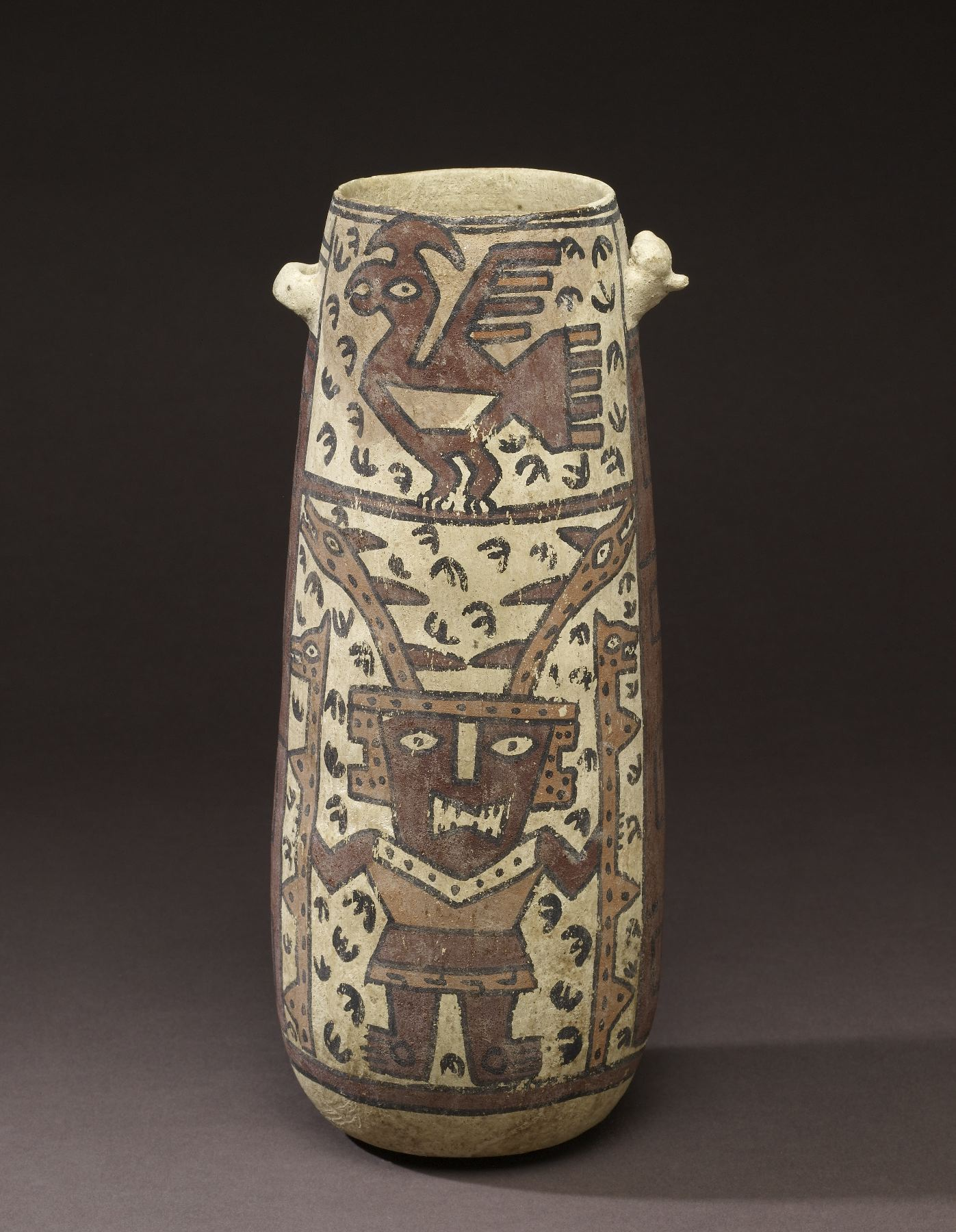
Vessel; 1000–1470; earthenware, slip paint; height: 29.6 cm (11.6 in.); diameter: 12.1 cm (4.7 in.); Walters Art Museum

==== Inca ====
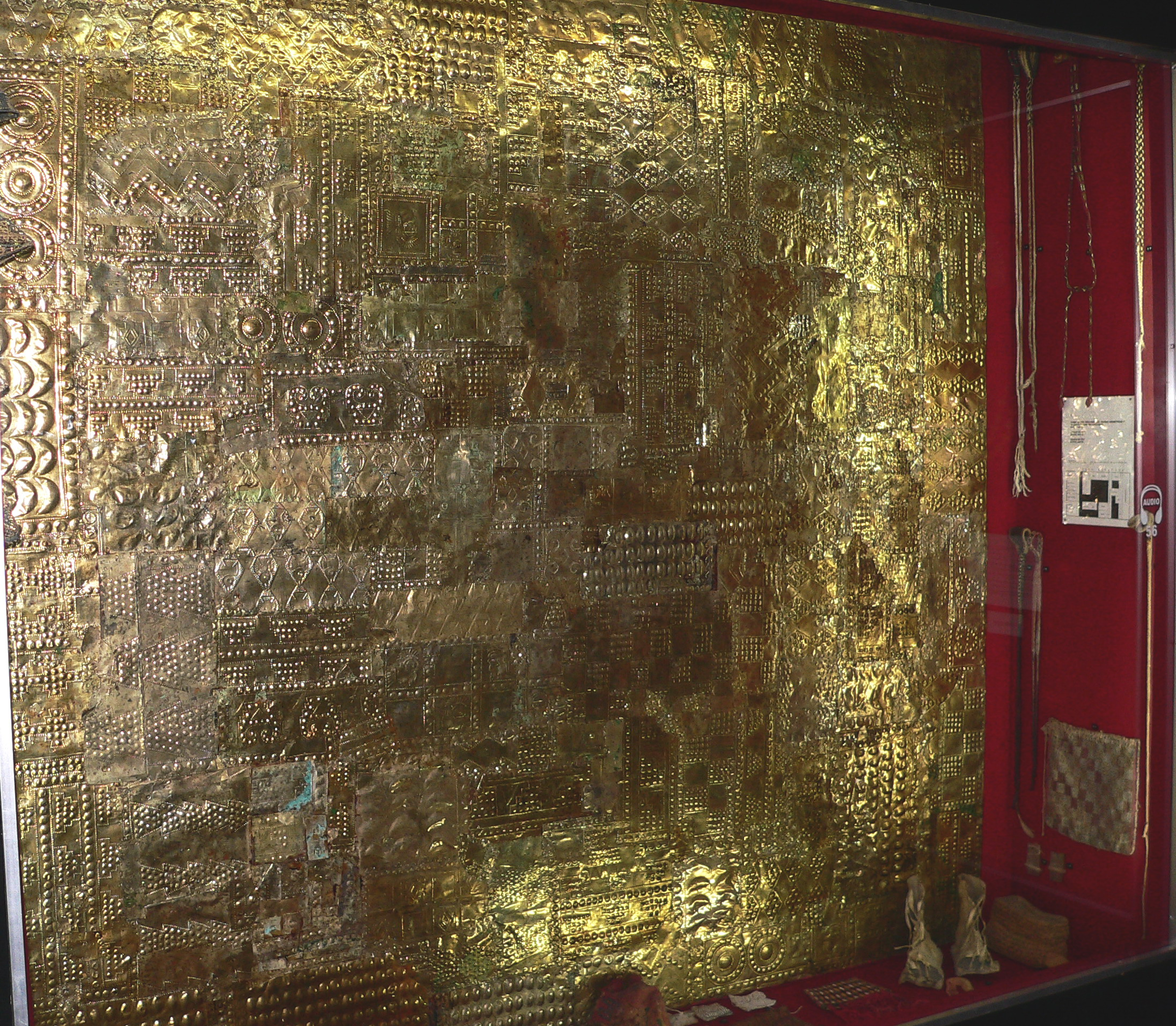
Hammered and Repoussed gold mural

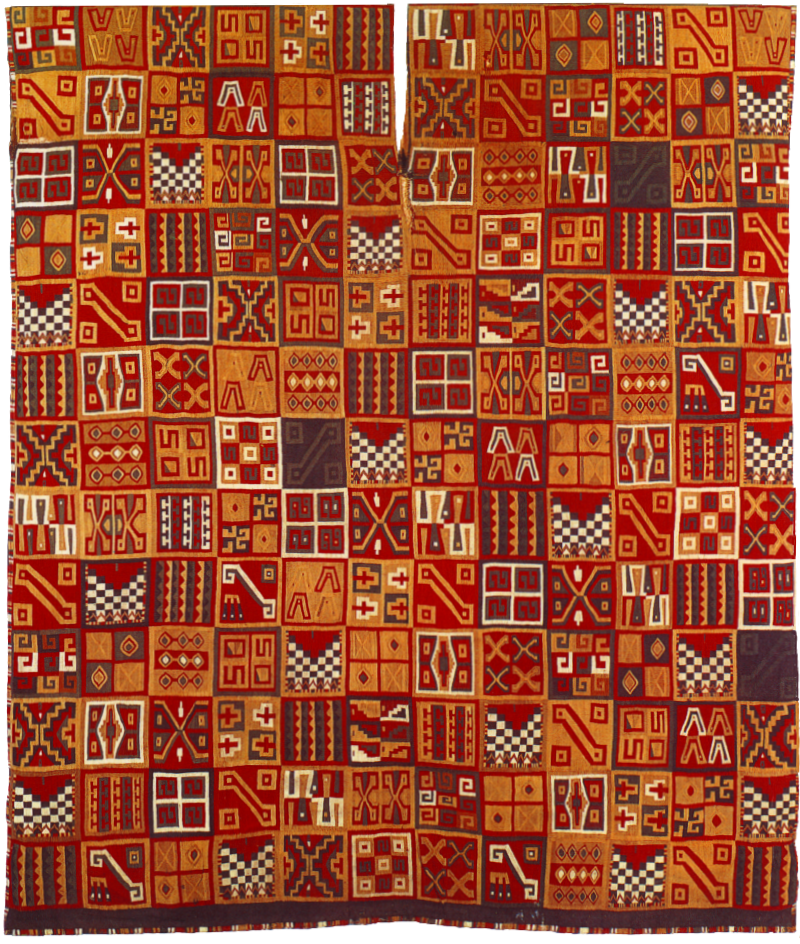
Inca tunic

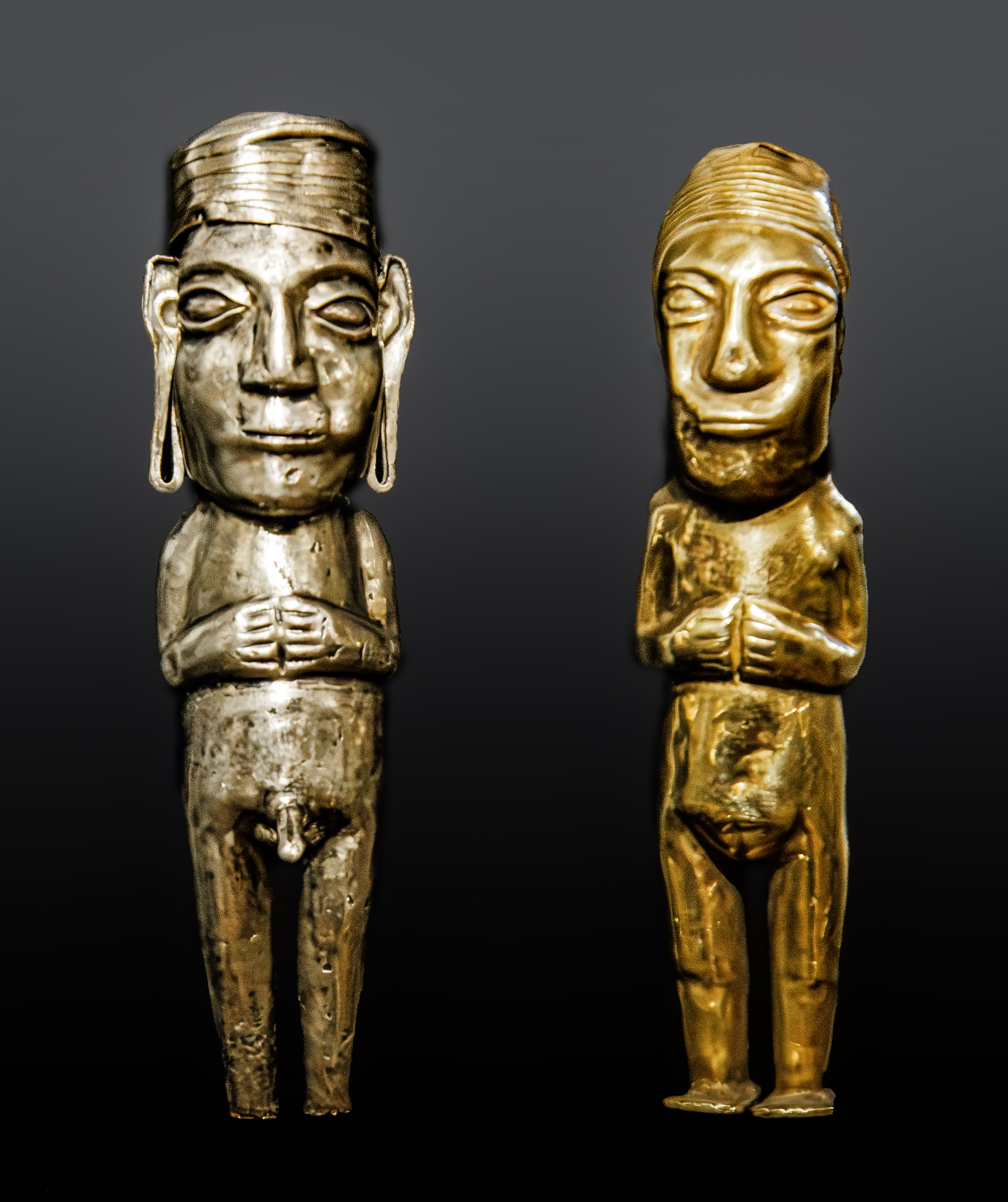
Silver and gold Inca statuettes, from the Musee D'Auch

=== Amazonia ===
Traditionally limited in access to stone and metals, Amazonian indigenous peoples excel at featherwork, painting, textiles, and ceramics. Caverna da Pedra Pintada (Cave of the Painted Rock) in the Pará state of Brazil houses the oldest firmly dated art in the Americas – rock paintings dating back 11,000 years. The cave is also the site of the oldest ceramics in the Americas, from 5000 BCE.

The Island of Marajó, at the mouth of the Amazon River was a major center of ceramic traditions as early as 1000 CE and continues to produce ceramics today, characterized by cream-colored bases painted with linear, geometric designs of red, black, and white slips.

With access to a wide range of native bird species, Amazonian indigenous peoples excel at feather work, creating brilliant colored headdresses, jewelry, clothing, and fans. Iridescent beetle wings are incorporated into earrings and other jewelry. Weaving and basketry also thrive in the Amazon, as noted among the Urarina of Peru.

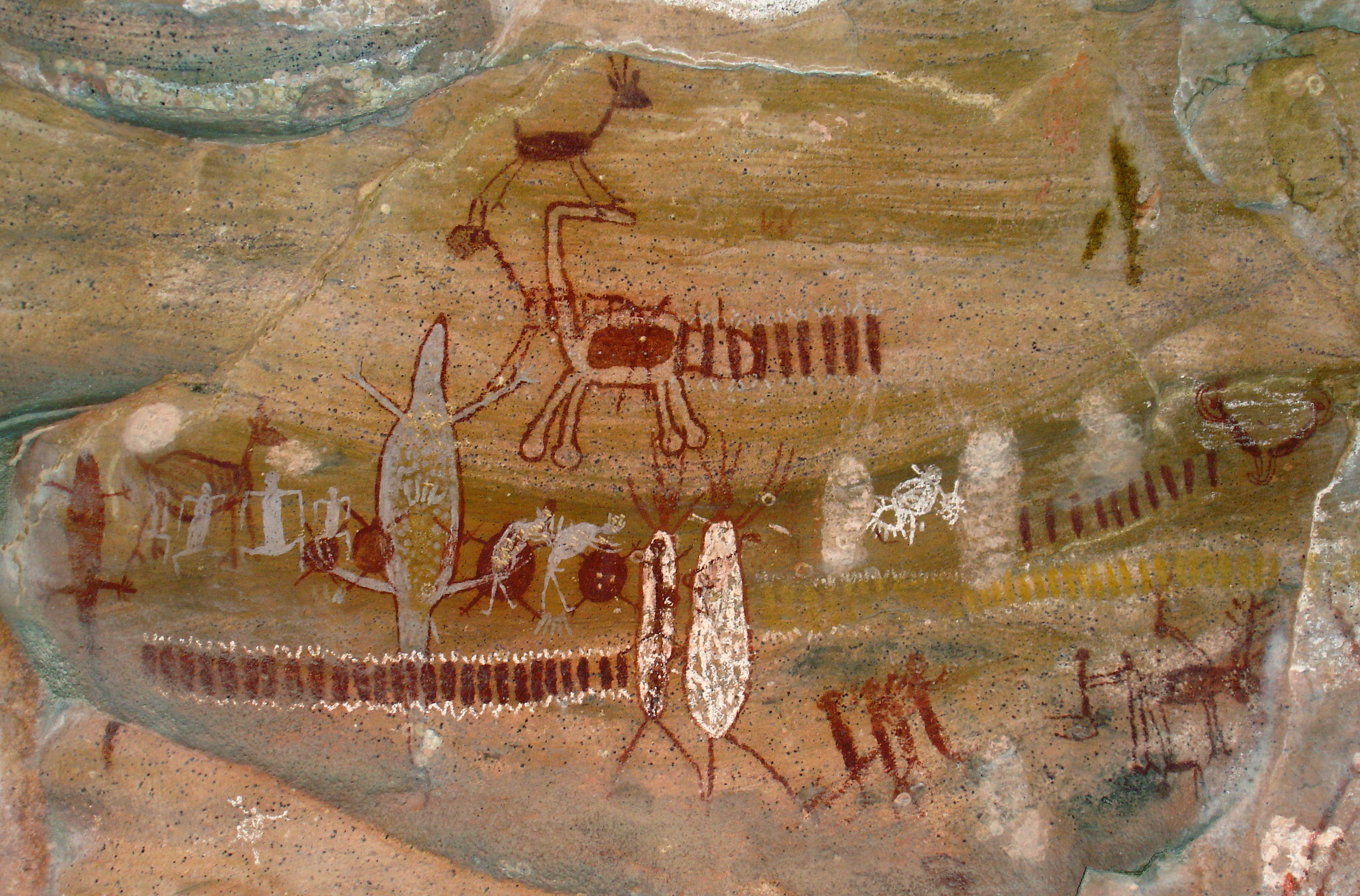
Cave painting, Serra da Capivara National Park

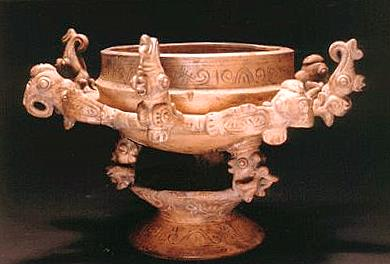
Ceramic zoomorphic vase, Santarém culture, Museu Paraense Emílio Goeldi, Belém, Brazil

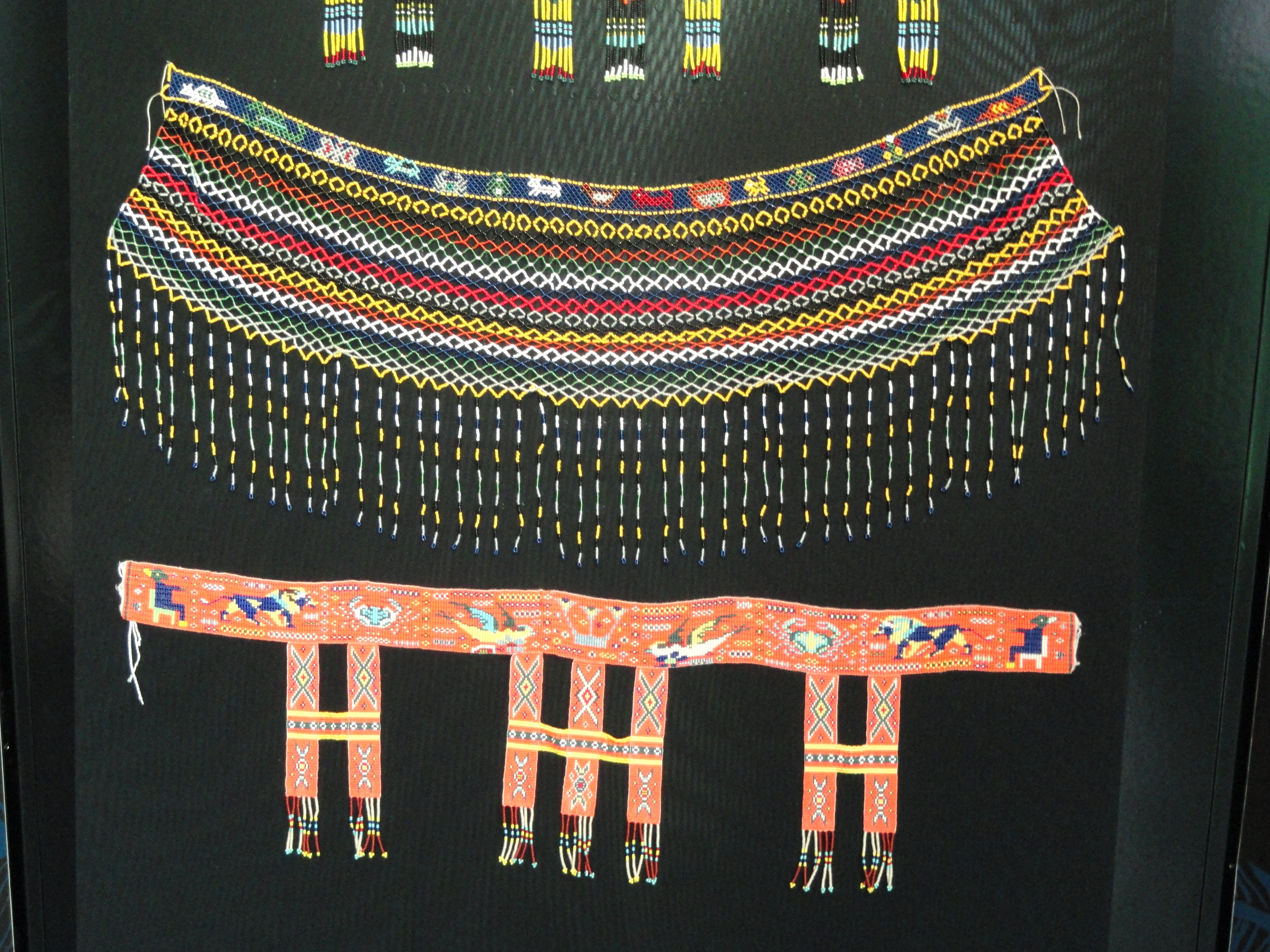
Tiriyó-Kaxuyana beadwork, Memorial dos Povos Indígenas, Brasília

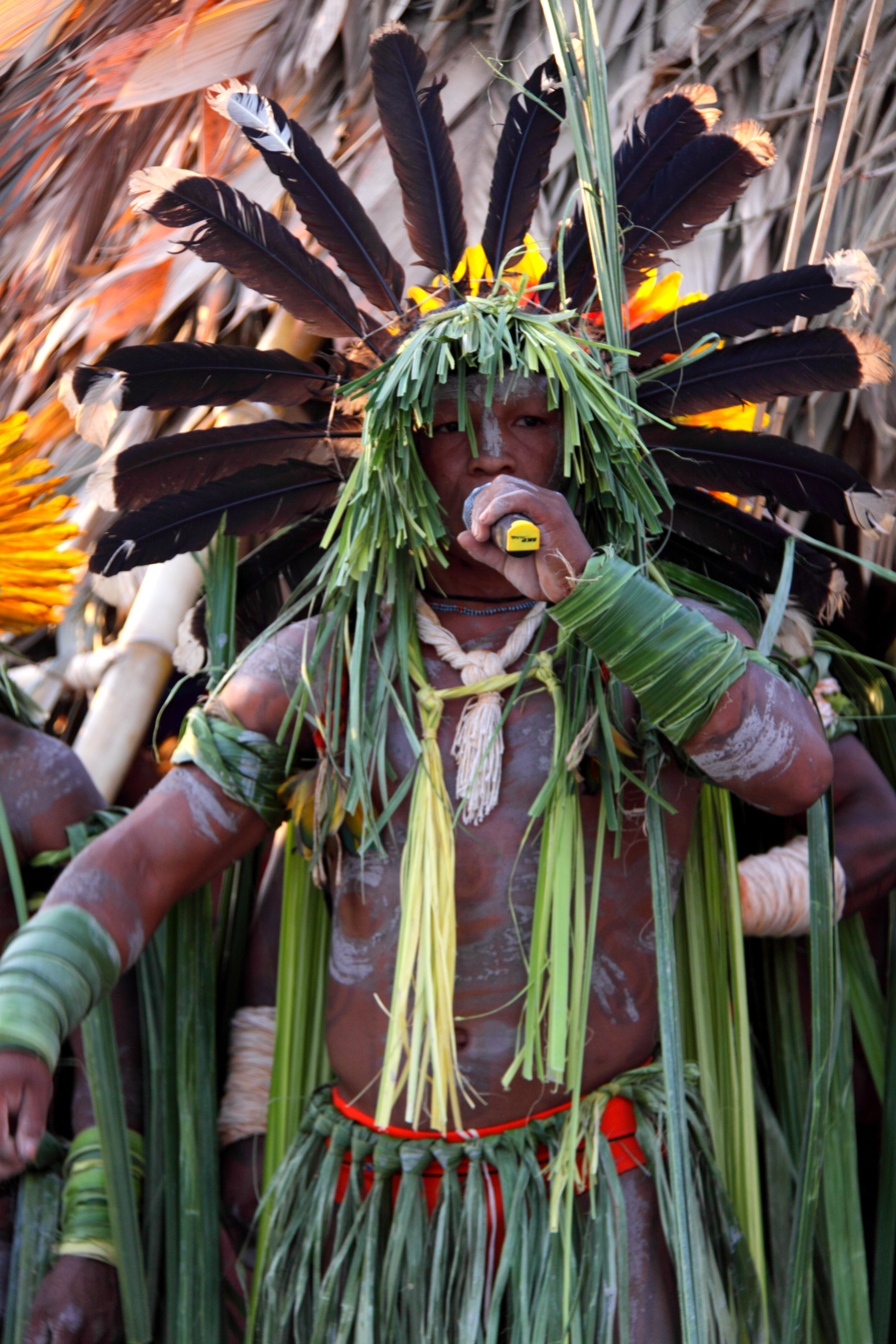
Enawene-nawe featherwork and body art

== Modern and contemporary ==
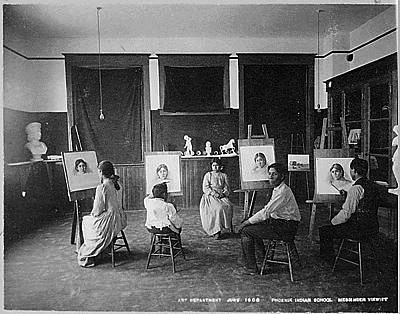
Drawing class at the Phoenix Indian School, 1900

=== Beginnings of contemporary Native American art ===
Pinpointing the exact time of emergence of "modern" and contemporary Native art is problematic. In the past, Western art historians have considered use of Western art media or exhibiting in international art arena as criteria for "modern" Native American art history. Native American art history is a new and highly contested academic discipline, and these Eurocentric benchmarks are followed less and less today. Many media considered appropriate for easel art were employed by Native artists for centuries, such as stone and wood sculpture and mural painting. Ancestral Pueblo artists painted with tempera on woven cotton fabric, at least 800 years ago. Certain Native artists used non-Indian art materials as soon as they became available. For example, Texcocan artist Fernando de Alva Cortés Ixtlilxóchitl painted with ink and watercolor on paper in the late 16th century. Bound together in the Codex Ixtlilxóchitl, these portraits of historical Texcocan leaders are rendered with shading, modeling and anatomic accuracy. The Cuzco School of Peru featured Quechua easel painters in the 17th and 18th centuries. The first cabinets of curiosities in the 16th century, precursors to modern museums, featured Native American art.

The notion that fine art cannot be functional has not gained widespread acceptance in the Native American art world, as evidenced by the high esteem and value placed upon rugs, blankets, basketry, weapons, and other utilitarian items in Native American art shows. A dichotomy between fine art and craft is not commonly found in contemporary Native art. For example, the Cherokee Nation honors its greatest artists as Living Treasures, including frog- and fish-gig makers, flint knappers, and basket weavers, alongside sculptors, painters, and textile artists. Art historian Dawn Ades writes, "Far from being inferior, or purely decorative, crafts like textiles or ceramics, have always had the possibility of being the bearers of vital knowledge, beliefs and myths."

Recognizable art markets between Natives and non-Natives emerged upon contact, but the 1820–1840s were a highly prolific time. In the Pacific Northwest and the Great Lakes region, tribes dependent upon the rapidly diminishing fur trade adopted art production a means of financial support. A painting movement known as the Iroquois Realist School emerged among the Haudenosaunee in New York in the 1820s, spearheaded by the brothers David and Dennis Cusick.

African-Ojibwe sculptor, Edmonia Lewis maintained a studio in Rome, Italy and carved Neoclassicist marble sculptors from the 1860s–1880s. Her mother belonged to the Mississauga band of the Credit River Indian Reserve. Lewis exhibited widely, and a testament to her popularity during her own time was that President Ulysses S. Grant commissioned her to carve his portrait in 1877.

Ho-Chunk artist, Angel De Cora was the best known Native American artist before World War I. She was taken from her reservation and family to the Hampton Institute, where she began her lengthy formal art training. Active in the Arts and Crafts movement, De Cora exhibited her paintings and design widely and illustrated books by Native authors. She strove to be tribally specific in her work and was revolutionary for portraying Indians in contemporary clothing of the early 20th century. She taught art to young Native students at Carlisle Indian Industrial School and was an outspoken advocate of art as a means for Native Americans to maintain cultural pride, while finding a place in mainstream society.

The Kiowa Six, a group of Kiowa painters from Oklahoma, met with international success when their mentor, Oscar Jacobson, showed their paintings in First International Art Exposition in Prague, Czechoslovakia in 1928. They also participated in the 1932 Venice Biennale, where their art display, according to Dorothy Dunn, "was acclaimed the most popular exhibit among all the rich and varied displays assembled."

The Santa Fe Indian Market began in 1922. John Collier became Commissioner of Indian Affairs in 1933 and temporarily reversed the BIA's assimilationist policies by encouraging Native American arts and culture. By this time, Native American art exhibits and the art market increased, gaining wider audiences. In the 1920s and 1930s, Indigenist art movements flourished in Peru, Ecuador, Bolivia, and Mexico, most famously with the Mexican Muralist movements.

=== Basketry ===
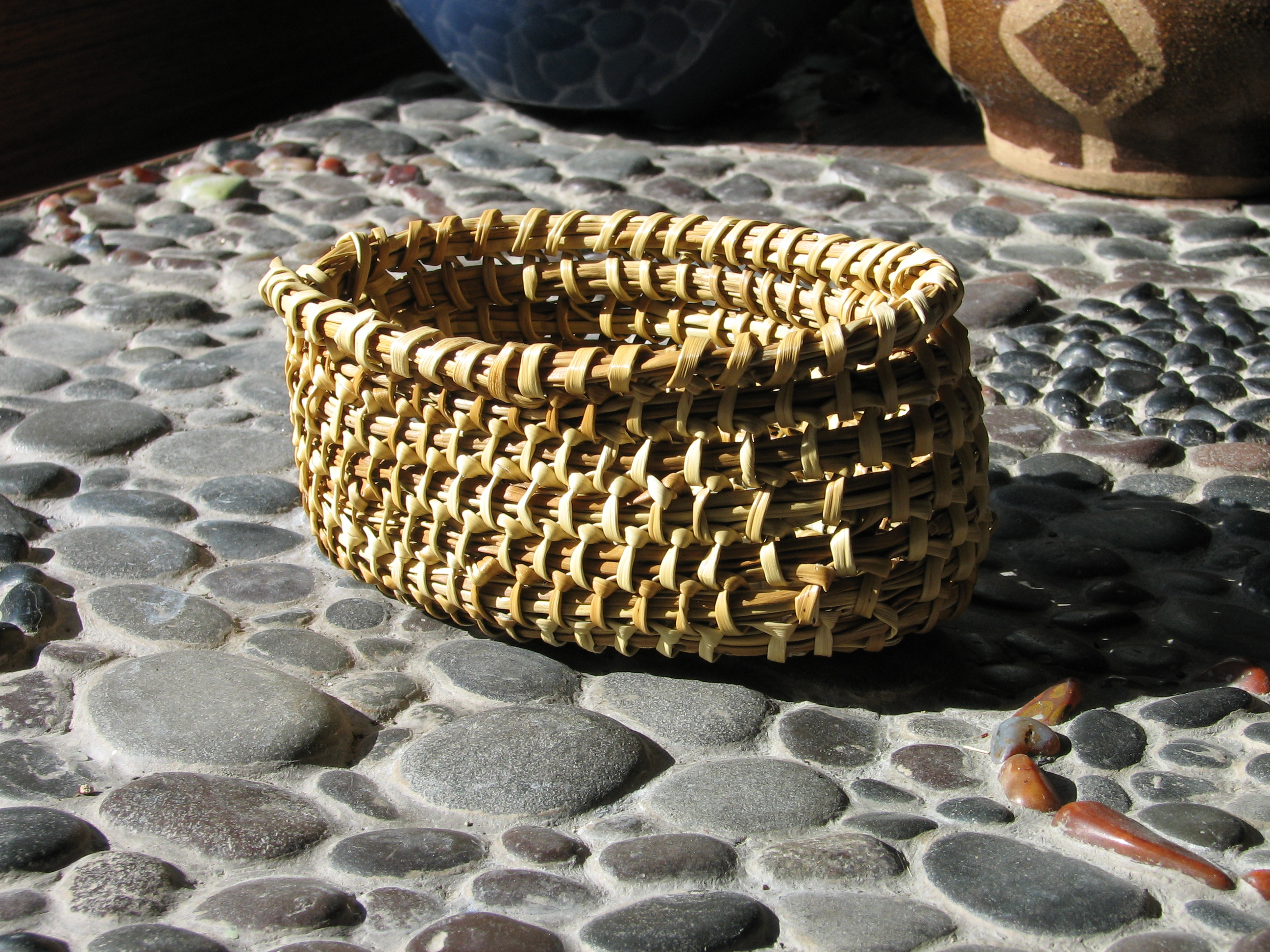
Traditional Yahgan basket, woven by Abuela Cristina Calderón, Chile, photo by Jim Cadwell

Basket weaving is one of the ancient and most-widespread art forms in the Americas. From coiled sea lyme grass baskets in Nunavut to bark baskets in Tierra del Fuego, Native artists weave baskets from a wide range of materials. Typically baskets are made of vegetable fibers, but Tohono O'odham are known for their horsehair baskets and Inupiaq artists weave baskets from baleen, filtering plates of certain whales. Grand Traverse Band Kelly Church, Wasco-Wishram Pat Gold, and Eastern Band Cherokee Joel Queen all weave baskets from copper sheets or wire, and Mi'kmaq-Onondaga conceptual artist Gail Tremblay weaves baskets in the traditional fancywork patterns of her tribes from exposed film. Basketry can take many forms. Haida artist Lisa Telford uses cedar bark to weave both traditional functional baskets and impractical but beautiful cedar evening gowns and high-heeled shoes.

A range of native grasses provides material for Arctic baskets, as does baleen, which is a 20th-century development. Baleen baskets are typically embellished with walrus ivory carvings. Cedar bark is often used in northwest coastal baskets. Throughout the Great Lakes and northeast, black ash and sweetgrass are woven into fancy work, featuring "porcupine" points, or decorated as strawberries. Bark baskets are traditional for gathering berries. Rivercane is the preferred material in the Southeast, and Chitimachas are regarded as the finest rivercane weavers. In Oklahoma, rivercane is prized but rare so baskets are typically made of honeysuckle or buckbrush runners. Coiled baskets are popular in the southwest and the Hopi and Apache in particular are known for pictorial coiled basketry plaques. The Tohono O'odham are well known for their basket-weaving prowess, and evidenced by the success of Annie Antone and Terrol Dew Johnson.

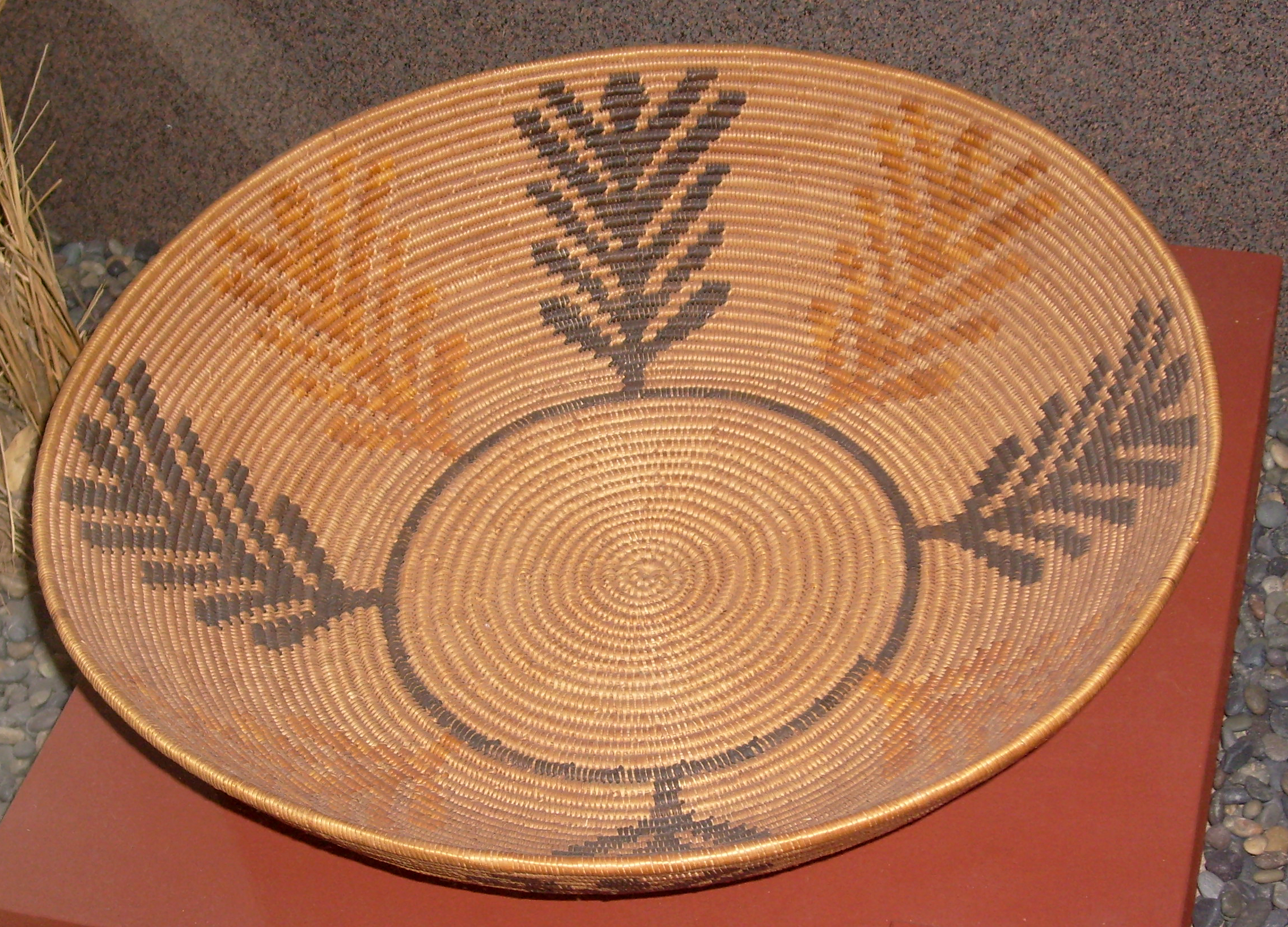
Kumeyaay coiled basket, Celestine Lachapa of Inajo, late 19th century

California and Great Basin tribes are considered some of the finest basket weavers in the world. Juncus is a common material in southern California, while sedge, willow, redbud, and devil's claw are also used. Pomo basket weavers are known to weave 60–100 stitches per inch and their rounded, coiled baskets adorned with quail's topknots, feathers, abalone, and clamshell discs are known as "treasure baskets". Three of the most celebrated Californian basket weavers were Elsie Allen (Pomo), Laura Somersal (Wappo), and the late Pomo-Patwin medicine woman, Mabel McKay, known for her biography, Weaving the Dream. Louisa Keyser was a highly influential Washoe basket weaver.

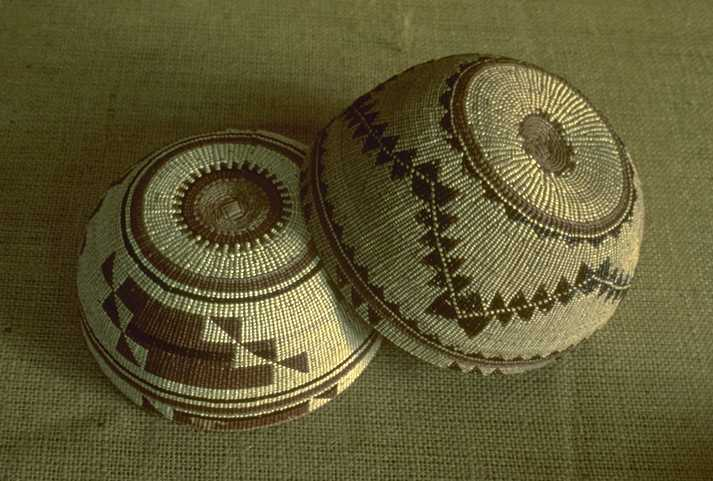
Yurok women's basketry caps, Northern California

A complex technique called "doubleweave," which involves continuously weaving both an inside and outside surface is shared by the Choctaw, Cherokee, Chitimacha, Tarahumara, and Venezuelan tribes. Mike Dart, Cherokee Nation, is a contemporary practitioner of this technique. The Tarahumara, or Raramuri, of Copper Canyon, Mexico typically weave with pine needles and sotol. In Panama, Embera-Wounaan peoples are renowned for their pictorial chunga palm baskets, known as hösig di, colored in vivid full-spectrum of natural dyes.

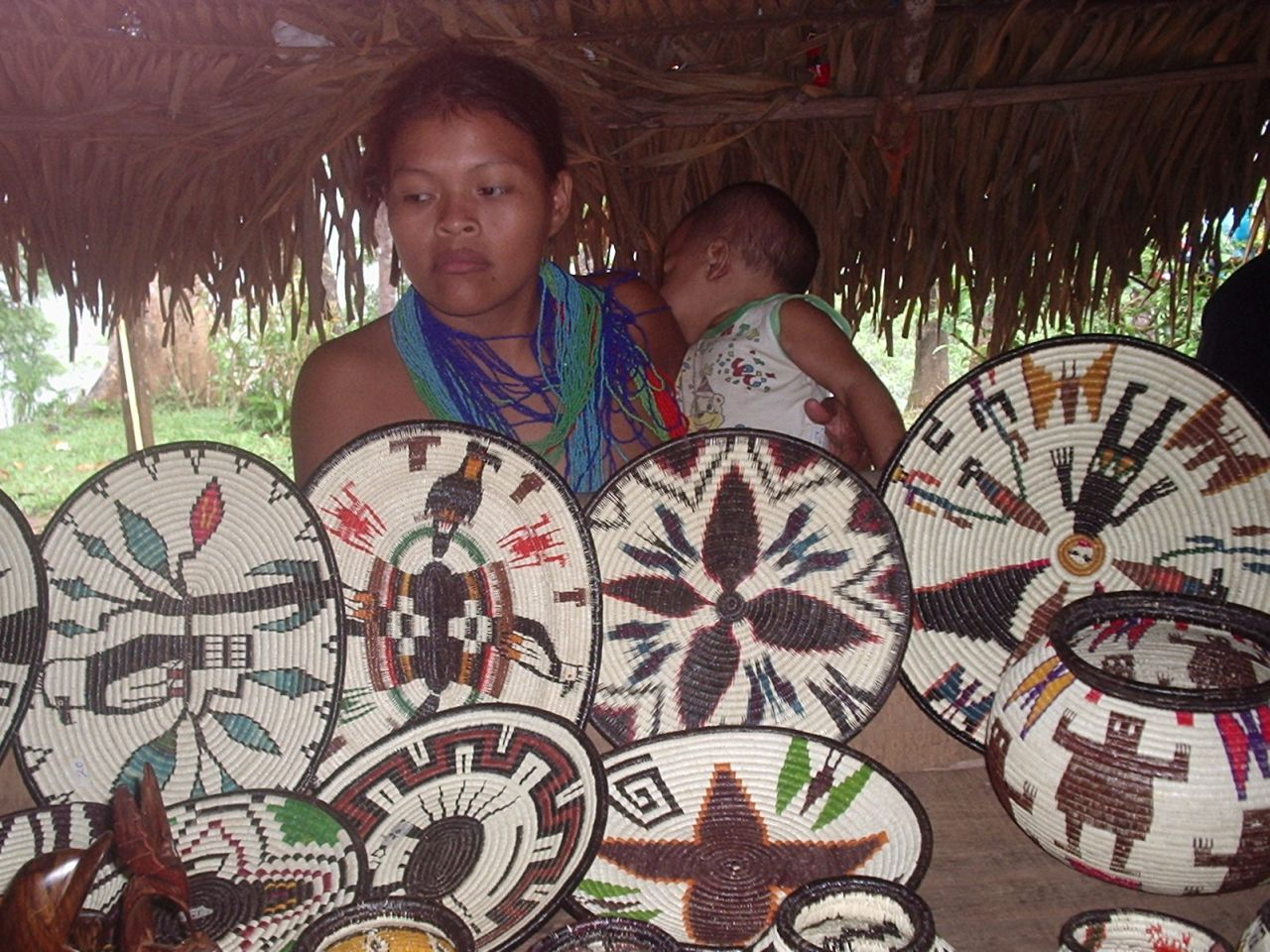
Embera woman selling coiled baskets, Panama

Yanomamo basket weavers of the Venezuelan Amazon paint their woven tray and burden baskets with geometric designs in charcoal and onto, a red berry. While in most tribes the basket weavers are often women, among the Waura tribe in Brazil, men weave baskets. They weave a wide range of styles, but the largest are called mayaku, which can be two feet wide and feature tight weaves with an impressive array of designs.

Today basket weaving often leads to environmental activism. Indiscriminate pesticide spraying endangers basket weavers' health. The black ash tree, used by basket weavers from Michigan to Maine, is threatened by the emerald ash borer. Basket weaver Kelly Church has organized two conferences about the threat and teaches children how to harvest black ash seeds. Many native plants that basket weavers use are endangered. Rivercane only grows in 2% of its original territory. Cherokee basket weaver and ethnobotanist, Shawna Cain is working with her tribe to form the Cherokee Nation Native Plant Society. Tohono O'odham basket weaver Terrol Dew Johnson, known for his experimental use of gourds, beargrass, and other desert plants, took his interest in native plants and founded Tohono O'odham Community Action, which provides traditional wild desert foods for his tribe.

=== Beadwork ===
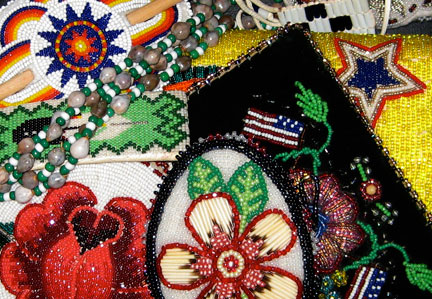
Examples of contemporary Native American beadwork

Beadwork is a quintessentially Native American art form, but ironically uses beads imported from Europe and Asia. Glass beads have been in use for almost five centuries in the Americas. Today a wide range of beading styles flourish.

In the Great Lakes, Ursuline nuns introduced floral patterns to tribes, who quickly applied them to beadwork. Great Lakes tribes are known for their bandolier bags, that might take an entire year to complete. During the 20th century the Plateau tribes, such as the Nez Perce perfected contour-style beadwork, in which the lines of beads are stitch to emphasize the pictorial imagery. Plains tribes are master beaders, and today dance regalia for man and women feature a variety of beadwork styles. While Plains and Plateau tribes are renowned for their beaded horse trappings, Subarctic tribes such as the Dene bead lavish floral dog blankets. Eastern tribes have a completely different beadwork aesthetic, and Innu, Mi'kmaq, Penobscot, and Haudenosaunee tribes are known for symmetrical scroll motifs in white beads, called the "double curve." Iroquois are also known for "embossed" beading in which strings pulled taut force beads to pop up from the surface, creating a bas-relief. Tammy Rahr (Cayuga) is a contemporary practitioner of this style. Zuni artists have developed a tradition of three-dimensional beaded sculptures.

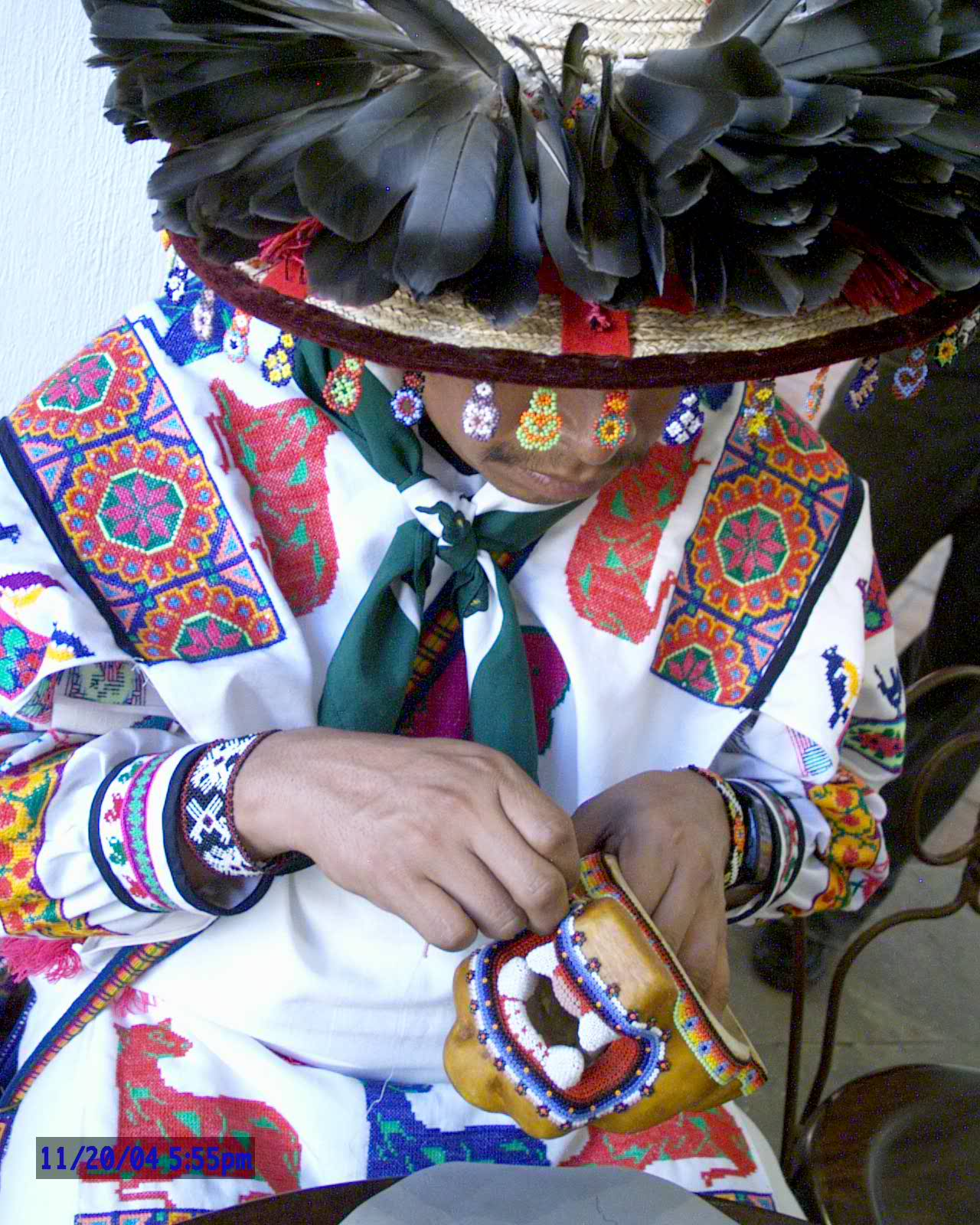
Huichol bead artist, photo by Mario Jareda Beivide

Huichol Indians of Jalisco and Nayarit, Mexico have a unique approach to beadwork. They adhere beads, one by one, to a surface, such as wood or a gourd, with a mixture of resin and beeswax.

Most Native beadwork is created for tribal use but beadworkers also create conceptual work for the art world. Richard Aitson (Kiowa-Apache) has both an Indian and non-Indian audience for his work and is known for his fully beaded cradleboards. Another Kiowa beadworker, Teri Greeves has won top honors for her beadwork, which consciously integrates both traditional and contemporary motifs, such as beaded dancers on Converse high-tops. Greeves also beads on buckskin and explores such issues as warfare or Native American voting rights.

Marcus Amerman, Choctaw, one of today's most celebrated bead artists, pioneered a movement of highly realistic beaded portraits. His imagery ranges from 19th century Native leaders to pop icons such as Janet Jackson and Brooke Shields.

Roger Amerman, Marcus' brother, and Martha Berry, Cherokee, have effectively revived Southeastern beadwork, a style that had been lost because of forced removal from tribes to Indian Territory. Their beadwork commonly features white bead outlines, an echo of the shell beads or pearls Southeastern tribes used before contact.

Jamie Okuma (Luiseño-Shoshone-Bannock) was won top awards with her beaded dolls, which can include entire families or horses and riders, all with fully beaded regalia. The antique Venetian beads she uses can as small as size 22°, about the size of a grain of salt. Juanita Growing Thunder Fogarty, Rhonda Holy Bear, and Charlene Holy Bear are also prominent beaded dollmakers.

The widespread popularity of glass beads does not mean aboriginal bead making is dead. Perhaps the most famous Native bead is wampum, a cylindrical tube of quahog or whelk shell. Both shells produce white beads, but only parts of the quahog produce purple. These are ceremonially and politically important to a range of Northeastern Woodland tribes. Elizabeth James-Perry (Aquinnah Wampanoag-Eastern Band Cherokee) creates wampum jewelry today, including wampum belts.

=== Ceramics ===
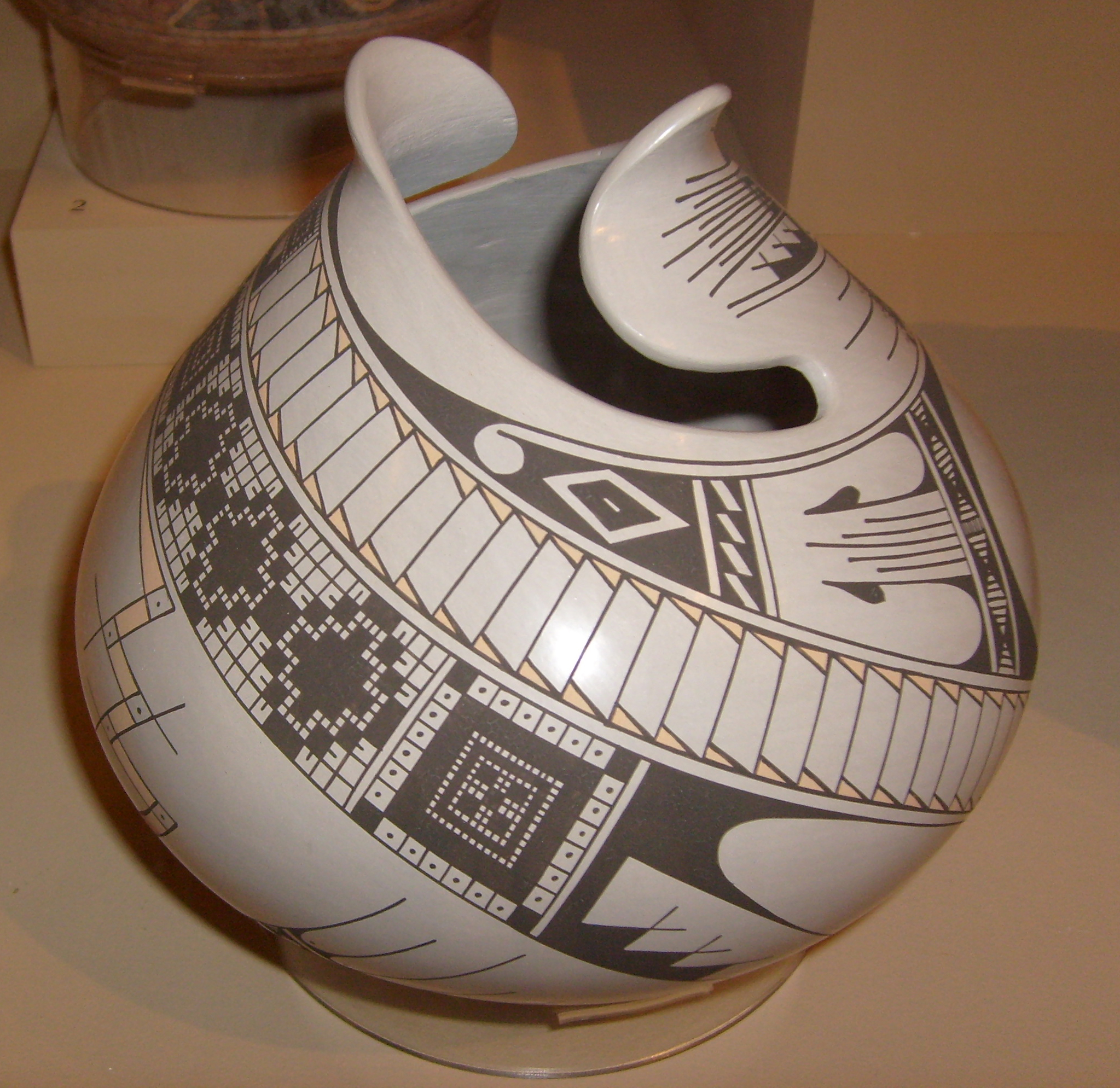
Mata Ortiz pottery jar by Jorge Quintana, 2002. Displayed at Museum of Man, San Diego, California

Ceramics have been created in the Americas for the last 8000 years, as evidenced by pottery found in Caverna da Pedra Pintada in the heart of the Brazilian Amazon. The Island of Marajó in Brazil remains a major center of ceramic art today. In Mexico, Mata Ortiz pottery continues the ancient Casas Grandes tradition of polychrome pottery. Juan Quezada is one of the leading potters from Mata Ortiz.

In the Southeast, the Catawba tribe is known for its tan-and-black mottled pottery. Eastern Band Cherokees' pottery has Catawba influences. In Oklahoma, Cherokees lost their pottery traditions until revived by Anna Belle Sixkiller Mitchell. The Caddo tribe's centuries-long pottery tradition had died out in the early 20th century, but has been effectively revived by Jereldine Redcorn.

Pueblo people are particularly known for their ceramic traditions. Nampeyo (c. 1860 – 1942) was a Hopi potter who collaborated with anthropologists to revive traditional pottery forms and designs, and many of her relatives are successful potters today. Maria and Julian Martinez, both San Ildefonso Pueblo revived their tribe's blackware tradition in the early 20th century. Julian invented a gloss-matte blackware style for which his tribe is still known today. Lucy Lewis (1898–1992) of Acoma Pueblo gained recognition for her black-on-white ceramics in the mid-20th century. Cochiti Pueblo was known for its grotesque figurines at the turn-of-the-20th century, and these have been revived by Virgil Ortiz. Cochiti potter Helen Cordero (1915–1994) invented storyteller figures, which feature a large, single figure of a seated elder telling stories to groups of smaller figures.

While northern potters are not as well known as their southern counterparts, ceramic arts extend as far north as the Arctic. Inuk potter, Makituk Pingwartok of Cape Dorset uses a pottery wheel to create her prizewinning ceramics.

Today contemporary Native potters create a wide range of ceramics from functional pottery to monumental ceramic sculpture. Roxanne Swentzell of Santa Clara Pueblo is one of the leading ceramic artists in the Americas. She creates coil-built, emotionally charged figures that comment on contemporary society. Nora Naranjo-Morse, also of Santa Clara Pueblo is world-renowned for her individual figures as well as conceptual installations featuring ceramics. Diego Romero of Cochiti Pueblo is known for his ceramic bowls, painted with satirical scenes that combine Ancestral Pueblo, Greek, and pop culture imagery. Hundreds more Native contemporary ceramic artists are taking pottery in new directions.

=== Jewelry ===
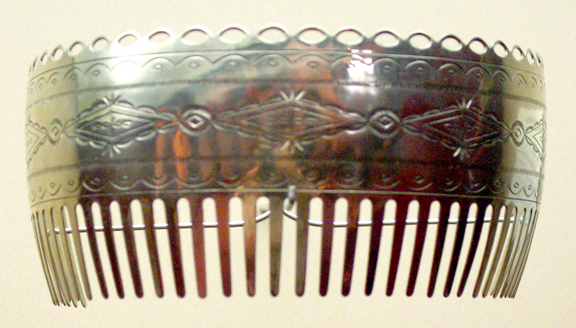
German silver hair comb, by Bruce Caeser (Pawnee/Sac & Fox), Oklahoma, 1984, Oklahoma Historical Society

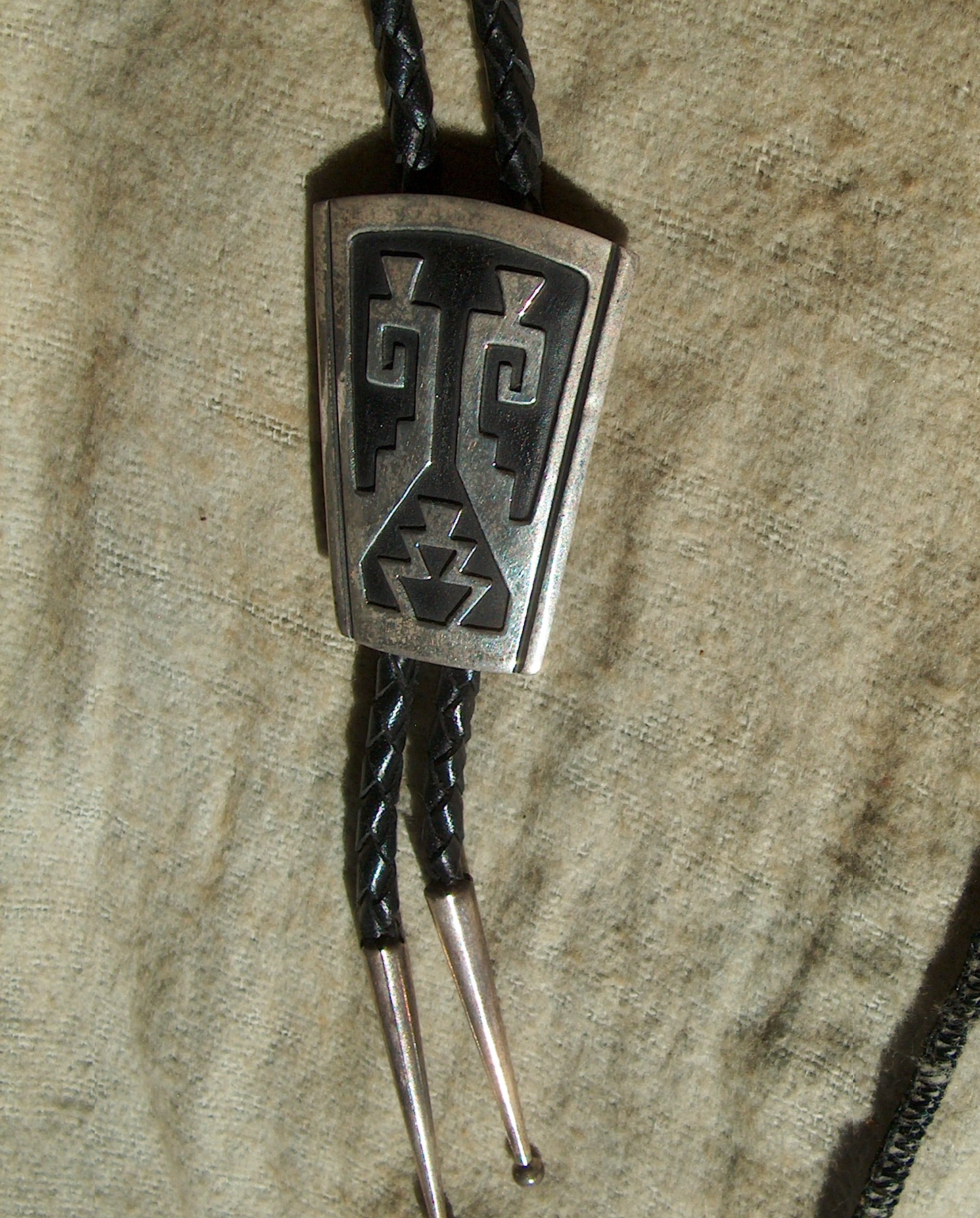
Silver overlay bolo tie by Tommy Singer (Navajo), New Mexico, c. 1980s

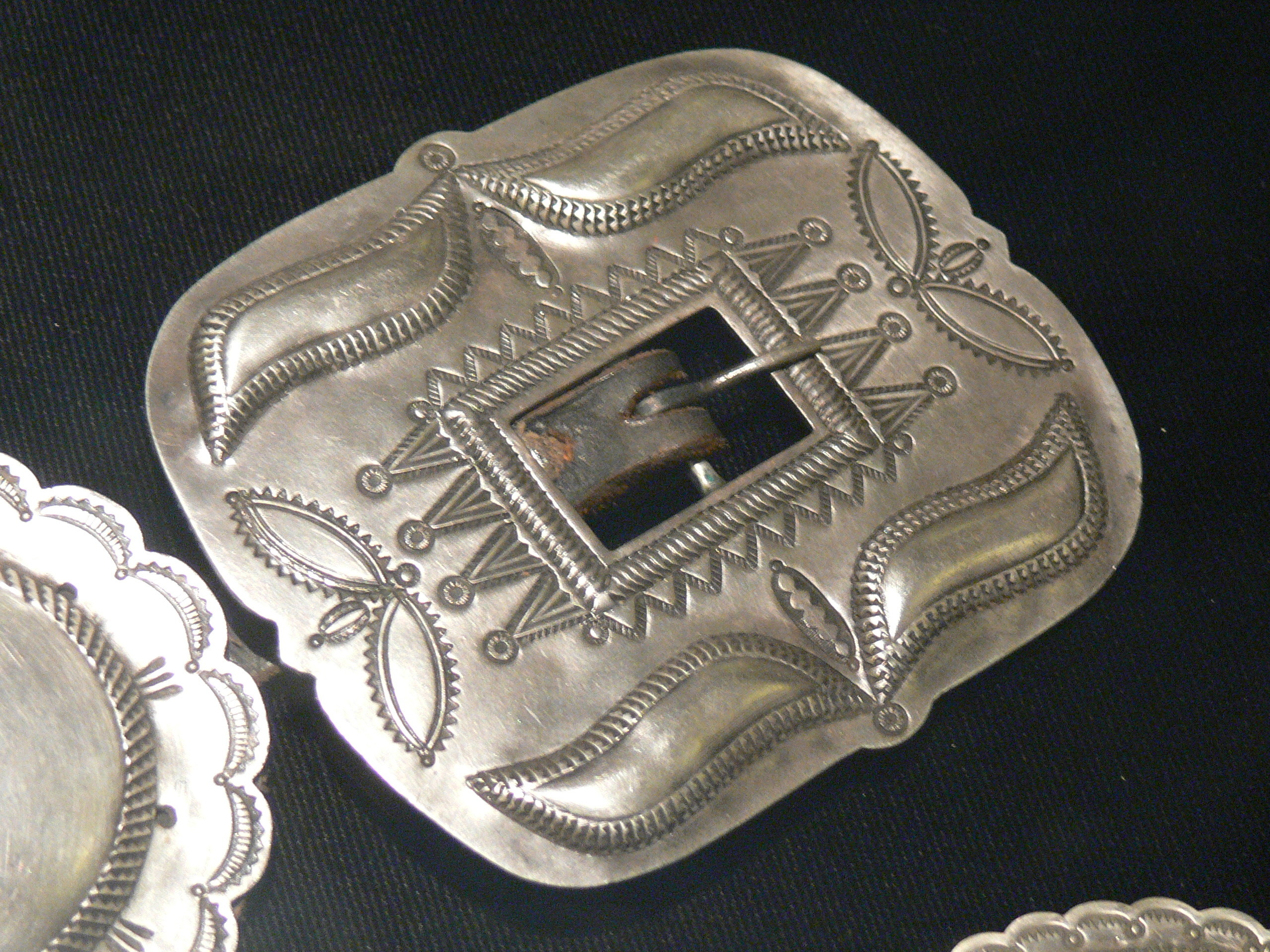
Navajo stamped silver belt buckle, collection of Woolaroc

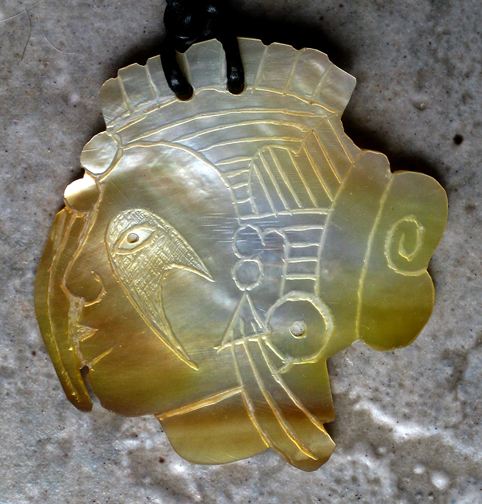
Shell gorget carved by Benny Pokemire (Eastern Band Cherokee)

=== Performance art ===
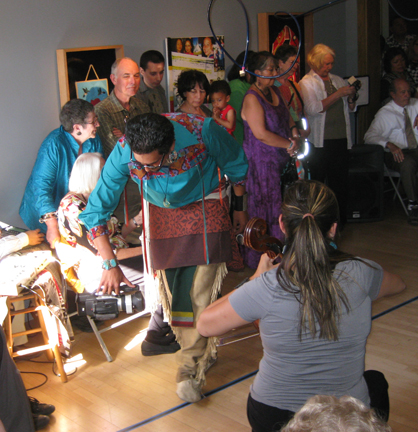
Performance art by Wayne Gaussoin (Picuris), Museum of Contemporary Native Art

Performance art is a new art form, emerging in the 1960s, and so does not carry the cultural baggage of many other art genres. Performance art can draw upon storytelling traditions, as well as music and dance, and often includes elements of installation, video, film, and textile design. Rebecca Belmore, a Canadian Ojibway performance artist, has represented her country in the prestigious Venice Biennale. James Luna, a Luiseño-Mexican performance artist, also participated in the Venice Biennale in 2005, representing the National Museum of the American Indian.

Performance allows artists to confront their audience directly, challenge long held stereotypes, and bring up current issues, often in an emotionally charged manner. "[P]eople just howl in their seats, and there's ranting and booing or hissing, carrying on in the audience," says Rebecca Belmore of the response to her work. She has created performances to call attention to violence against and many unsolved murders of First Nations women. Both Belmore and Luna create elaborate, often outlandish outfits and props for their performances and move through a range of characters. For instance, a repeating character of Luna's is Uncle Jimmy, a disabled veteran who criticizes greed and apathy on his reservation.

On the other hand, Marcus Amerman, a Choctaw performance artist, maintains a consistent role of the Buffalo Man, whose irony and social commentary arise from the odd situations in which he finds himself, for instance a James Bond movie or lost in a desert labyrinth. Jeff Marley, Cherokee, pulls from the tradition of the "booger dance" to create subversive, yet humorous, interventions that take history and place into account.

Erica Lord, Inupiaq-Athabaskan, explores her mixed-race identity and conflicts about the ideas of home through her performance art. In her words, "In order to sustain a genuine self, I create a world in which I shift to become one or all of my multiple visions of self." She has suntanned phrases into her skin, donned cross-cultural and cross-gender disguises, and incorporated songs, ranging from Inupiaq throat singing to racist children's rhymes into her work.

A Bolivian anarcha-feminist cooperative, Mujeres Creando or "Women Creating" features many indigenous artists. They create public performances or street theater to bring attention to issues of women's, indigenous people's, and lesbian's rights, as well as anti-poverty issues. Julieta Paredes, María Galindo and Mónica Mendoza are founding members.

Performance art has allowed Native Americans access to the international art world, and Rebecca Belmore mentions that her audiences are non-Native; however, Native American audiences also respond to this genre. Bringing It All Back Home, a 1997 film collaboration between James Luna and Chris Eyre, documents Luna's first performance at his own home, the La Jolla Indian Reservation. Luna describes the experience as "probably the scariest moment of my life as an artist ... performing for the members of my reservation in the tribal hall."

=== Photography ===
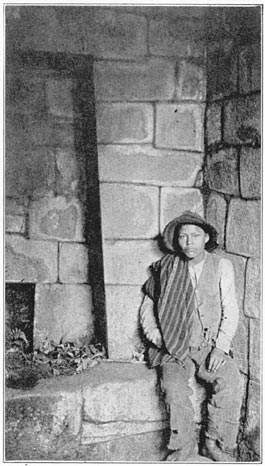
Martín Chambi (Peru), photo of a man at Machu Picchu, published in Inca Land. Explorations in the Highlands of Peru, 1922

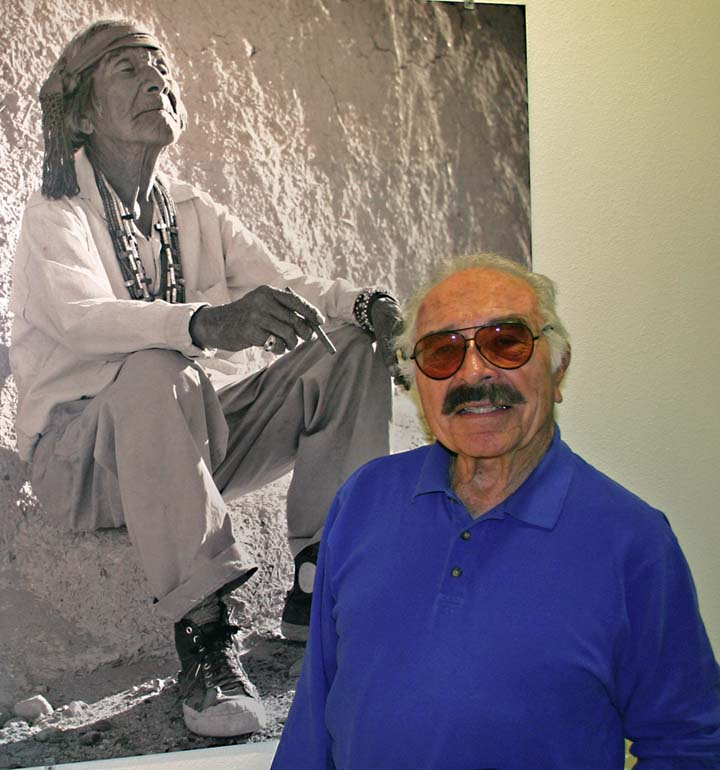
Lee Marmon (Laguna Pueblo, 1925–2021), next to his most famous photograph, "White Man's Moccasins"

Native Americans embraced photography in the 19th century. Some even owned their own photography studios, such as Benjamin Haldane (1874–1941), Tsimshian of Metlakatla Village on Annette Island, Alaska, Jennie Ross Cobb (Cherokee Nation, 1881–1959) of Park Hill, Oklahoma, and Richard Throssel (Cree, 1882–1933) of Montana. Their early photographs stand in stark contrast to the romanticized images of Edward Curtis and other contemporaries. Scholarship by Mique’l Askren (Tsimshian/Tlingit) on the photographs of B.A. Haldane has analyzed the functions that Haldane's photographs served for his community: as markers of success by having Anglo-style formal portraits taken, and as markers of the continuity of potlatching and traditional ceremonials by having photographs taken in ceremonial regalia. This second category is particularly significant because the use of the ceremonial regalia was against the law in Canada between 1885 and 1951.

Martín Chambi (Quechua, 1891–1973), a photographer from Peru, was one of the pioneering Indigenous photographers of South America. Peter Pitseolak (Inuk, 1902–1973), from Cape Dorset, Nunavut, documented Inuit life in the mid-20th century while dealing with challenges presented by the harsh climate and extreme light conditions of the Canadian Arctic. He developed his film himself in his igloo, and some of his photos were shot by oil lamps. Following in the footsteps of early Kiowa amateur photographers Parker McKenzie(1897–1999) and Nettie Odlety McKenzie (1897–1978), Horace Poolaw (Kiowa, 1906–1984) shot over 2000 images of his neighbors and relatives in Western Oklahoma from the 1920s onward. Jean Fredericks (Hopi, 1906–1990) carefully negotiated Hopi cultural views toward photography and did not offer his portraits of Hopi people for sale to the public.

Today innumerable Native people are professional art photographers; however, acceptance to the genre has met with challenges. Hulleah Tsinhnahjinnie (Navajo/Muscogee/Seminole) has not only established a successful career with her own work, she has also been an advocate for the entire field of Native American photography. She has curated shows and organized conferences at the C.N. Gorman Museum at UC Davis featuring Native American photographers. Tsinhnahjinnie wrote the book, Our People, Our Land, Our Images: International Indigenous Photographers. Native photographers have taken their skills into the fields of art videography, photocollage, digital photography, and digital art.

=== Printmaking ===
Although it is widely speculated that the ancient Adena stone tablets were used for printmaking, not much is known about aboriginal American printmaking. 20th-century Native artists have borrowed techniques from Japan and Europe, such as woodcut, linocut, serigraphy, monotyping, and other practices.

Printmaking has flourished among Inuit communities in particular. European-Canadian James Houston created a graphic art program in Cape Dorset, Nunavut in 1957. Houston taught local Inuit stone carvers how to create prints from stone-blocks and stencils. He asked local artists to draw pictures and the shop generated limited edition prints, based on the ukiyo-e workshop system of Japan. Cooperative print shops were also established in nearby communities, including Baker Lake, Puvirnituq, Holman, and Pangnirtung. These shops have experimented with etching, engraving, lithography, and silkscreen. Shops produced annual catalogs advertising their collections. Local birds and animals, spirit beings, and hunting scenes are the most popular subject matter, but are allegorical in nature. Backgrounds tend to be minimal and perspective is mixed. One of the most prominent of Cape Dorset artists is Kenojuak Ashevak (born 1927), who has received many public commissions and two honorary doctorate degrees. Other prominent Inuit printmakers and graphic artists include Parr, Osuitok Ipeelee, Germaine Arnaktauyok, Pitseolak Ashoona, Tivi Etok, Helen Kalvak, Jessie Oonark, Kananginak Pootoogook, Pudlo Pudlat, Irene Avaalaaqiaq Tiktaalaaq, and Simon Tookoome. Inuk printmaker Andrew Qappik designed the coat of arms of Nunavut.

Many Native painters transformed their paintings into fine art prints. Potawatomi artist Woody Crumbo created bold, screen prints and etchings in the mid-20th century that blended traditional, flat Bacone Style with Art Deco influences. Kiowa-Caddo-Choctaw painter, T.C. Cannon traveled to Japan to study wood block printing from master printers.

In Chile, Mapuche printmaker Santos Chávez (1934–2001) was one of the most celebrated artists of his country – with over 85 solo exhibitions during his lifetime.

Melanie Yazzie (Navajo), Linda Lomahaftewa (Hopi-Choctaw), Fritz Scholder and Debora Iyall (Cowlitz) have all built successful careers with their print and have gone on to teach the next generation of printers. Walla Walla artist, James Lavadour founded Crow's Shadow Institute of the Arts on the Umatilla Reservation in Oregon in 1992. Crow's Shadow features a state-of-the-art printmaking studio and offers workshops, exhibition space, and printmaking residencies for Native artists, in which they pair visiting artists with master printers.

=== Sculpture ===
Native Americans have created sculpture, both monumental and small, for millennia. Stone sculptures are ubiquitous through the Americas, in the forms of stelae, inuksuit, and statues. Alabaster stone carving is popular among Western tribes, where catlinite carving is traditional in the Northern Plains and fetish-carving is traditional in the Southwest, particularly among the Zuni. The Taíno of Puerto Rico and the Dominican Republic are known for their zemis– sacred, three-pointed stone sculptures.

Inuit artists sculpt with walrus ivory, caribou antlers, bones, soapstone, serpentinite, and argillite. They often represent local fauna and humans engaged in hunting or ceremonial activities.

Edmonia Lewis paved the way for Native American artists to sculpt in mainstream traditions using non-Native materials. Allan Houser (Warms Springs Chiricahua Apache) became one of the most prominent Native sculptors of the 20th century. Though he worked in wood and stone, Houser is most known for his monumental bronze sculptors, both representational and abstract. Houser influenced a generation of Native sculptors by teaching at the Institute of American Indian Arts. His two sons, Phillip and Bob Haozous are sculptors today. Roxanne Swentzell (Santa Clara Pueblo) is known for her expressive, figurative, ceramic sculptures but has also branched into bronze casting, and her work is permanently displayed at the National Museum of the American Indian.

The Northwest Coastal tribes are known for their woodcarving – most famously their monumental totem poles that display clan crests. During the 19th century and early 20th century, this art form was threatened but was effectively revived. Kwakwaka'wakw totem pole carvers such as Charlie James, Mungo Martin, Ellen Neel, and Willie Seaweed kept the art alive and also carved masks, furniture, bentwood boxes, and jewelry. Haida carvers include Charles Edenshaw, Bill Reid, and Robert Davidson. Besides working in wood, Haida also work with argillite. Traditional formline designs translate well into glass sculpture, which is increasingly popular thanks to efforts by contemporary glass artists such as Preston Singletary (Tlingit), Susan Point (Coast Salish) and Marvin Oliver (Quinault/Isleta Pueblo).

In the Southeast, woodcarving dominates sculpture. Willard Stone, of Cherokee descent, exhibited internationally in the mid-20th century. Amanda Crowe (Eastern Band Cherokee) studied sculpture at the Art Institute of Chicago and returned to her reservation to teach over 2000 students woodcarving over a period of 40 years, ensuring that sculpture thrives as an art form on the Qualla Boundary.

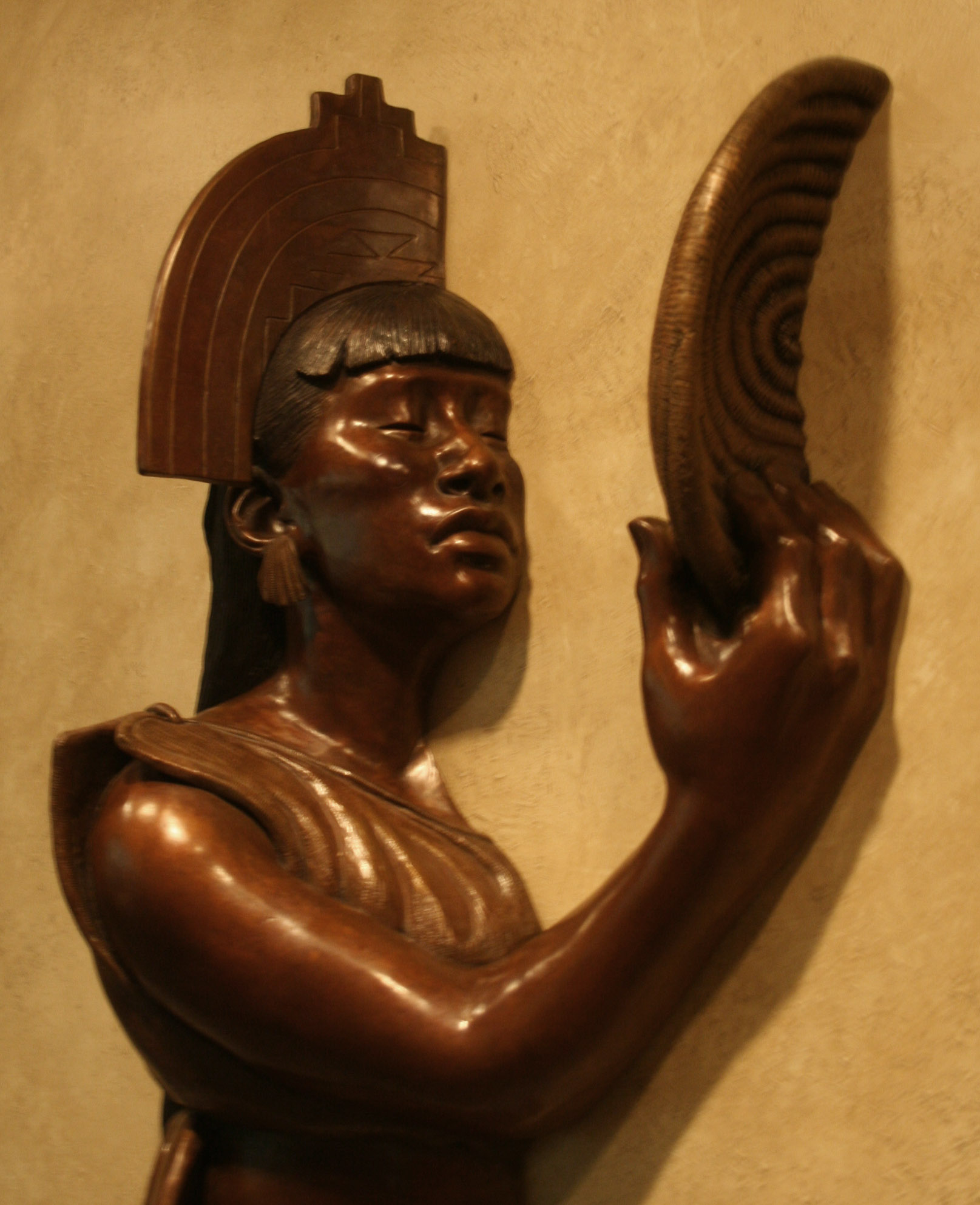
For Life in all Directions, Roxanne Swentzell (Santa Clara Pueblo), bronze, NMAI

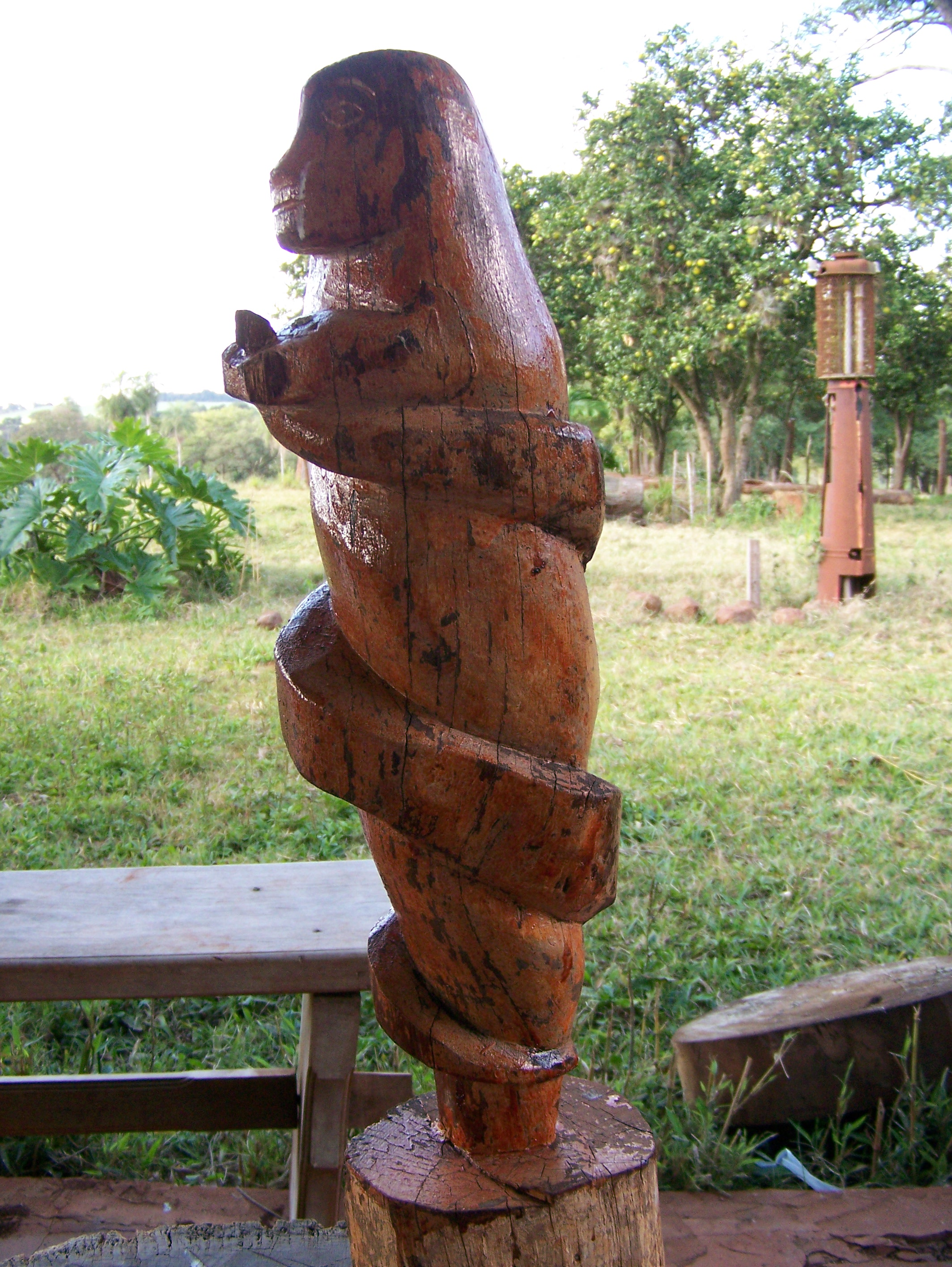
Pai Tavytera traditional woodcarving, Amambay Department, Paraguay, 2008

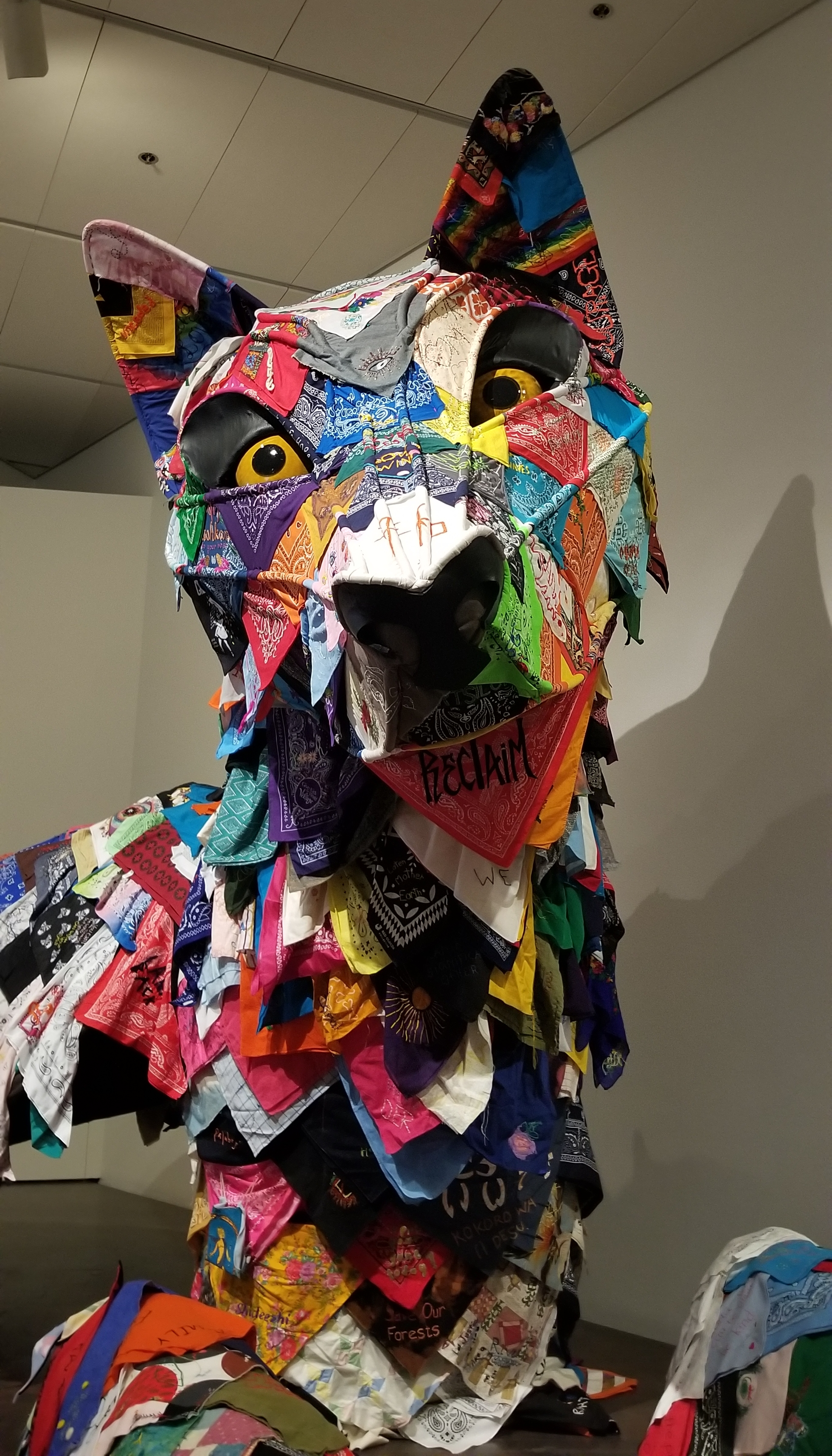
Each/Other by Marie Watt and Cannupa Hanska Luger, 2021

=== Textiles ===
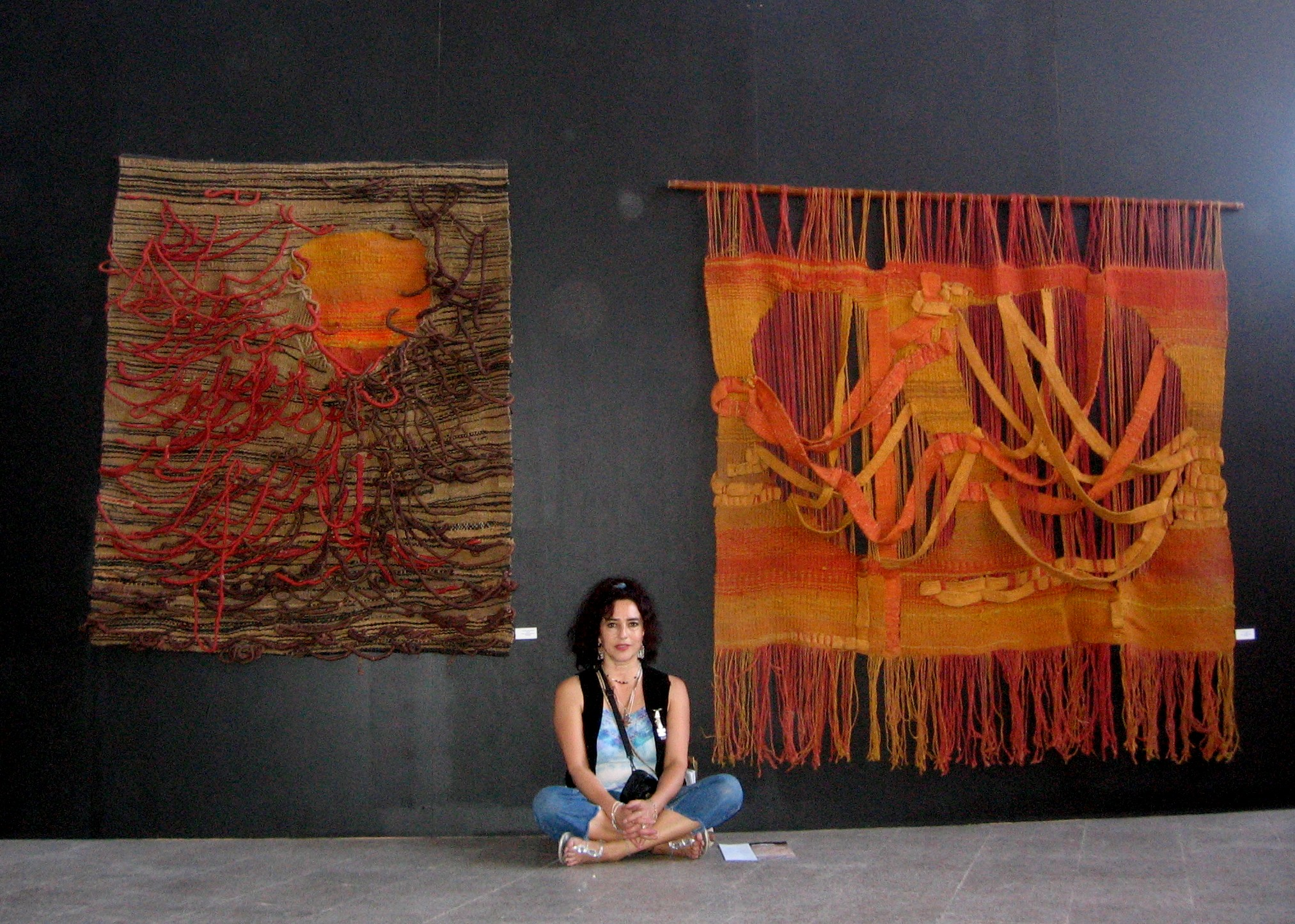
Lorena Lemunguier Quezada (Mapuche) with two of her weavings at the Bienal de Arte Indígena, Santiago, Chile

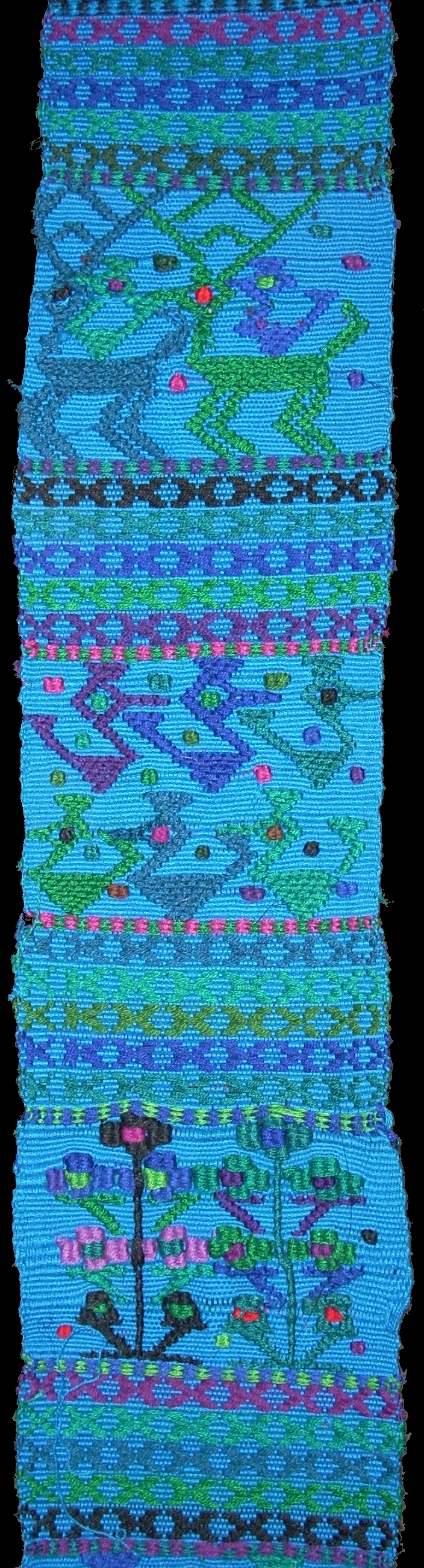
Kaqchikel Maya sash, Santa Catarina Palopó, Guatemala, c. 2006–07

Fiberwork dating back 10,000 years has been unearthed from Guitarrero Cave in Peru. Cotton and wool from alpaca, llamas, and vicuñas have been woven into elaborate textiles for thousands of years in the Andes and are still important parts of Quechua and Aymara culture today. Coroma in Antonio Quijarro Province, Bolivia is a major center for ceremonial textile production. An Aymara elder from Coroma said, "In our sacred weavings are expressions of our philosophy, and the basis for our social organization... The sacred weavings are also important in differentiating one community, or ethnic group, from a neighboring group..."

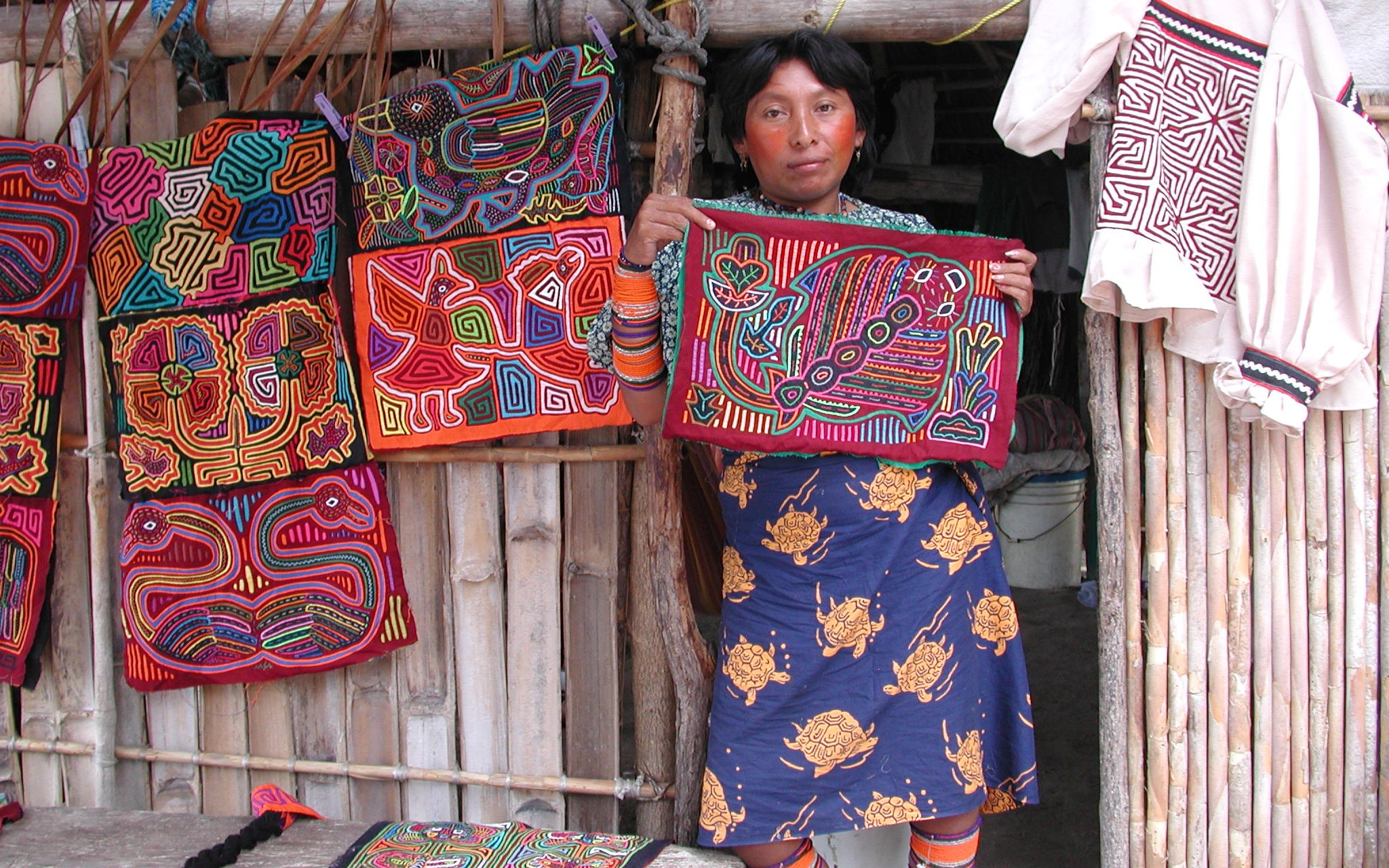
Guna woman with molas, San Blas Islands, Panama

Guna tribal members of Panama and Colombia are famous for their molas, cotton panels with elaborate geometric designs created by a reverse appliqué technique. Designs originated from traditional skin painting designs but today exhibit a wide range of influences, including pop culture. Two mola panels form a blouse, but when a Guna woman is tired of a blouse, she can disassemble it and sell the molas to art collectors.

Mayan women have woven cotton with backstrap looms for centuries, creating items such as huipils or traditional blouses. Elaborate Maya textiles featured representations of animals, plants, and figures from oral history. Organizing into weaving collectives have helped Mayan women earn better money for their work and greatly expand the reach of Mayan textiles in the world.

Seminole seamstresses, upon gaining access to sewing machines in the late 19th century and early 20th centuries, invented an elaborate appliqué patchwork tradition. Seminole patchwork, for which the tribe is known today, came into full flower in the 1920s.

Great Lakes and Prairie tribes are known for their ribbonwork, found on clothing and blankets. Strips of silk ribbons are cut and appliquéd in layers, creating designs defined by negative space. The colors and designs might reflect the clan or gender of the wearer. Powwow and other dance regalia from these tribes often feature ribbonwork. These tribes are also known for their fingerwoven sashes.

Pueblo men weave with cotton on upright looms. Their mantas and sashes are typically made for ceremonial use for the community, not for outside collectors.

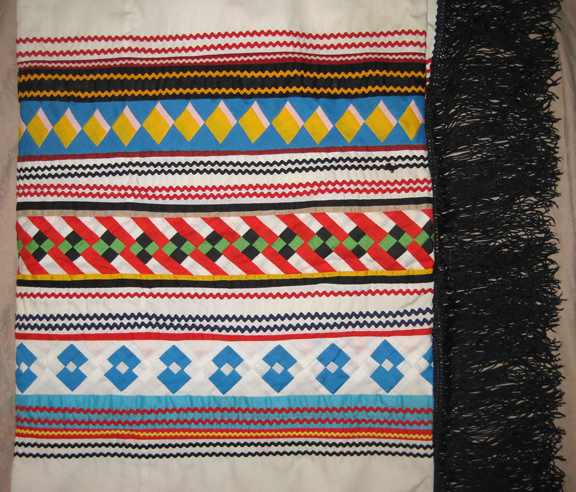
Seminole patchwork shawl made by Susie Cypress from Big Cypress Indian Reservation, c. 1980s

Navajo rugs are woven by Navajo women today from Navajo-Churro sheep or commercial wool. Designs can be pictorial or abstract, based on traditional Navajo, Spanish, Oriental, or Persian designs. 20th-century Navajo weavers include Clara Sherman and Hosteen Klah, who co-founded the Wheelwright Museum of the American Indian.

In 1973, the Navajo Studies Department of the Diné College in Many Farms, Arizona, wanted to determine how long it took a Navajo weaver to create a rug or blanket from sheep shearing to market. The study determined the total amount of time was 345 hours. Out of these 345 hours, the expert Navajo weaver needed: 45 hours to shear the sheep and process the wool; 24 hours to spin the wool; 60 hours to prepare the dye and to dye the wool; 215 hours to weave the piece; and only one hour to sell the item in their shop.

Customary textiles of Northwest Coast peoples using non-Western materials and techniques are enjoying a dramatic revival. Chilkat weaving and Ravenstail weaving are regarded as some of the most difficult weaving techniques in the world. A single Chilkat blanket can take an entire year to weave. In both techniques, dog, mountain goat, or sheep wool and shredded cedar bark are combined to create textiles featuring curvilinear formline designs. Tlingit weaver Jennie Thlunaut (1982–1986) was instrumental in this revival.

Experimental 21st-century textile artists include Lorena Lemunguier Quezada, a Mapuche weaver from Chile, and Martha Gradolf (Winnebago), whose work is overtly political in nature. Valencia, Joseph and Ramona Sakiestewa (Hopi) and Melissa Cody (Navajo) explore non-representational abstraction and use experimental materials in their weaving.

== Cultural sensitivity and repatriation ==
As in most cultures, Native peoples create some works that are to be used only in sacred, private ceremonies. Many sacred objects or items that contain medicine are to be seen or touched by certain individuals with specialized knowledge. Many Pueblo and Hopi katsina figures (tihü in Hopi and kokko in Zuni) and katsinam regalia are not meant to be seen by individuals who have not received instruction about that particular katsina. Many institutions do not display these publicly out of respect for tribal taboos.

Midewiwin birch bark scrolls are deemed too culturally sensitive for public display, as are medicine bundles, certain sacred pipes and pipe bags, and other tools of medicine people.

Navajo sandpainting is a component for healing ceremonies, but sandpaintings can be made into permanent art that is acceptable to sell to non-Natives as long as Holy People are not portrayed. Various tribes prohibit photography of many sacred ceremonies, as used to be the case in many Western cultures. As several early photographers broke local laws, photographs of sensitive ceremonies are in circulation, but tribes prefer that they not be displayed. The same can be said for photographs or sketches of medicine bundle contents.

Two Mohawk leaders sued a museum, trying to remove a False Face Society mask or Ga:goh:sah from an exhibit because "it was a medicine object intended to be seen only by community members and that its public display would cause irreparable harm to the Mohawk." The Grand Council of the Haudenosaunee has ruled that such masks are not for sale or public display, nor are Corn Husk Society masks.

Tribes and individuals within tribes do not always agree about what is or is not appropriate to display to the public. Many institutions do not exhibit Ghost Dance regalia. At the request of tribal leaders, the Brooklyn Museum is among those that does not exhibit Plains warrior's shields or "artifacts imbued with a warrior's power". Many tribes do not want grave goods or items associated with burials, such as funerary urns, in museums, and many would like associated grave goods reinterred. The process is often facilitated within the United States under the Native American Graves Protection and Repatriation Act (NAGPRA). In Canada, repatriation is negotiated between the tribes and museums or through Land Claims laws. In international situations, institutions are not always legally required to repatriate indigenous cultural items to their place of origin; some museums do so voluntarily, as with Yale University's decision to return 5,000 artifacts and human remains to Cusco, Peru.

== Fraud ==
Fraud has been a challenge facing Indigenous artists of the Americas for decades. In 1935, the United States passed the Indian Arts and Crafts Act which established the Indian Arts and Crafts Board and outlawed "willfully offer[ing] for sale any goods, with or without any Government trade mark, as Indian products or Indian products of a particular Indian tribe or group, resident within the United States or the Territory of Alaska, when such person knows such goods are not Indian products or are not Indian products of the particular Indian tribe or group." In response to widespread Indigenous identity fraud, New Mexico passed the Indian Arts and Crafts Sales Act in 1959, which has been amended many times including in 1978 and 2023. Oklahoma passed its American Indian Arts and Crafts Sales Act of 1974. Native American activists fought to strengthen protections against fraud which resulted in the 1990 Indian Arts and Crafts Act (IACA), which makes it "illegal to offer or display for sale, or sell, any art or craft product in a manner that falsely suggests it is Indian produced, an Indian product, or the product of a particular Indian or Indian tribe or Indian arts and crafts organization, resident within the United States." The penalties for the violation of IACA can include fines up to $250,000 and/or sentences up to five years in prison.

Some tribes face so much fraud that they have had to enact their own laws to address the problem. The Cherokee Nation passed its own Cherokee Nation Truth in Advertising for Native Art in 2008. This law states that only citizens of the three federally recognized Cherokee tribes can sell their artwork, books, or other creative works as being "Cherokee."

Indigenous artists of Mexico and Guatemala have fought to protect their designs through intellectual property laws. Maya textile artists have lobbied for Guatemala to amend the nation's copyright laws to protect their collective intellectual property. Non-Native fashion designers have misappropriated Indigenous designs and artwork.

== Museum representation ==
Indigenous American arts have had a long and complicated relationship with museum representation since the early 1900s. In 1931, The Exposition of Indian Tribal Arts was the first large scale show that held Indigenous art on display. Their portrayal in museums grew more common later in the 1900s as a reaction to the Civil Rights Movement. With the rising trend of representation in the political atmosphere, minority voices gained more representation in museums as well.

Although Indigenous art was being displayed, the curatorial choices on how to display their work were not always made with the best of intentions. For instance, Native American art pieces and artifacts would often be shown alongside dinosaur bones, implying that they are a people of the past and non-existent or irrelevant in today's world. Native American remains were on display in museums up until the 1960s.

Though many did not yet view Native American art as a part of the mainstream as of the year 1992, there has since then been a great increase in volume and quality of both Native art and artists, as well as exhibitions and venues, and individual curators. Such leaders as the director of the National Museum of the American Indian insist that Native American representation be done from a first-hand perspective. The establishment of such museums as the Heard Museum and the National Museum of the American Indian, both of which trained spotlights specifically upon Native American arts, enabled a great number of Native artists to display and develop their work. For five months starting in October 2017, three Native American works of art selected from the Charles and Valerie Diker Collection to be exhibited in the American Wing at the Metropolitan Museum of Art.

Museum representation for Indigenous artists calls for great responsibility from curators and museum institutions. The Indian Arts and Crafts Act of 1990 prohibits non-Indigenous artists from exhibiting as Native American artists. Institutions and curators work discussing whom to represent, why are they being chosen, what Indigenous art looks like, and what its purpose is. Museums, as educational institutions, give light to cultures and narratives that would otherwise go unseen; they provide a necessary spotlight and who they choose to represent is pivotal to the history of the represented artists and culture.

== See also ==
- Archaeology of the Americas
- Indian Arts and Crafts Board
- Indian Space Painters
- Iroquois art
- List of indigenous artists of the Americas
- List of Native American artists
- Native American fashion
- Native American jewelry
- Native American pottery
- Painting in the Americas before Colonization
- Paraguayan indigenous art
- Pre-Columbian art
- Prehistoric art
  - List of Stone Age art
- Timeline of Native American art history
