= Rina Swentzell =

Pueblo architect, activist and artist (1939–2015)

Rina Naranjo Swentzell
- Born: 1939; Santa Clara Pueblo, New Mexico
- Died: October 30, 2015 (aged 75–76)
- Education: University of New Mexico, PhD American Studies
- Occupations: Architect, artist, activist and writer
- Spouse: Ralph Swentzell
- Children: 4, including Roxanne Swentzell
- Parent(s): Michael Edward and Rose Naranjo
- Relatives: Michael Naranjo, brother Nora Naranjo Morse, sister Jody Folwell, sister Jody Naranjo, niece Susan Folwell, niece Rose Bean Simpson, granddaughter

Rina Naranjo Swentzell (1939–2015) was a Tewa Santa Clara Puebloan author, potter, historian and architect. She was known for her expertise in Pueblo art and architecture, and for her work as an activist for the Santa Clara Pueblo people.

== Biography ==
Rina Swentzell was born Rina Naranjo to Rose "Gia" and Michael Naranjo, a Baptist minister and a traditional potter in Santa Clara Pueblo. One of ten children born to the Naranjo family, their mother's line hailed from a long line of ceramicists and Puebloan artists. Swentzell's brother Michael Naranjo and sister Jody Folwell would become prominent ceramic artists. Swentzell's home of the Santa Clara Pueblo, and the tradition of Puebloan pottery passed down through the generations would leave a strong impression on her future studies and career.

=== Academics and art ===
Plan of the Santa Clara Pueblo, where Swentzell was born and where she would focus her studies

Swentzell earned a bachelor's degree in education at New Mexico Highlands University. In 1976 she earned a Master of Art in architecture at the University of New Mexico. In 1982 she earned a doctorate in American Studies at the University of New Mexico. In 1989, she was honored with an International Woman Award from the University of New Mexico's Women's Studies program.

Swentzell became a preeminent expert in Pueblo art and architecture. She would go on to work as a consultant to the Institute of American Indian Arts and the Smithsonian and serve as a visiting lecturer to Yale and Oxford universities. In 1990, she was the subject of a public television art program ¡COLORES! Rina Swentzell: An Understated Sacredness where she shared her life growing up on the Pueblo in the 1940s. Her academic writing explored the conflicts between culture and landscape within the Santa Clara pueblo and the relationship between how architecture, land and space reflected the belief systems of the Tewa people who lived there.

In 1993, she wrote Children of Clay: A Family of Pueblo Potters (We Are Still Here) and in 1996 co-authored To Touch the Past: The Painted Pottery of the Mimbres People with J.J. Brody. In 1996, Swentzell shared the School for Advanced Research's Katrin H. Lamon fellowship with her sister Tessie Naranjo and brother Tito Naranjo, where they wrote Sacred to Secular: The Transformation of a Gendered Pueblo World. Tessie and Tito Naranjo similarly became established Pueblo academics.

In 2010, she published Younger-Older Ones: Tieu-Paadeh Ing, a novel about moving to the modern day Santa Clara Pueblo. Alongside her academic and architectural work, Swentzell followed in her family tradition to become a ceramic artist. Her art is described as challenging entrenched systems of patriarchy, capitalism and colonialism.

=== Personal life ===
After meeting at New Mexico Highlands University, Swentzell married Ralph Swentzell. They had four children, including artist Roxanne Swentzell. Her granddaughter is mixed media artist Rose Bean Simpson. In 2006, after Ralph's death, Swentzell moved from Santa Fe back to Santa Clara Pueblo. There, she and her daughter Athena designed and built an adobe house together, emblematic of the Puebloan style. It would be Swentzell's final architecture project. Swentzell died on October 30, 2015.

== See also ==
- Pueblo architecture
- Pueblo pottery
