= Douglas Miles =

American painter

Douglas Miles Sr
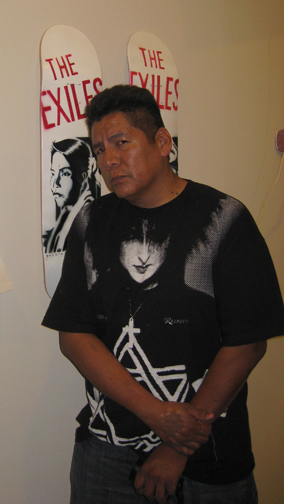
- Miles in 2008
- Born: December 27, 1963 (age 62); Carrizo, Arizona, U.S.
- Citizenship: San Carlos Apache, United States
- Known for: Street art, skateboard art, stencil art, painting, printmaking
- Movement: Apache art, Native pop

External images
- "Love is a losing game" by Douglas Miles, c. 2010
- "My Babe" by Miles

Douglas Miles is a White Mountain Apache-San Carlos Apache-Akimel O'odham painter, printmaker and photographer from Arizona, who founded Apache Skateboards and Apache Skate Team.

== Background ==
Miles was born in Carrizo, Arizona, on the Fort Apache Indian Reservation of the White Mountain Apache Tribe. He grew up in Phoenix, Arizona, then moved back to the San Carlos Apache Indian Reservation in Arizona. He drew images from cartoons, sci-fi, and comic books and attended the Al Collins Graphic Design School in Phoenix. From 1978 to 1980, Miles attended the Bostrom Alternative High School, when he created street art.

== Artwork and Apache Skateboards ==
Watching his son practice skateboarding, Miles drew corollaries between skateboarding and the Apache warrior tradition, as both involved increase concentration, stamina, and the ability to withstand pain. After finding no skate decks available relevant to Apache culture, Miles painted a skateboard deck himself. He gave it to his son, and this spawned Apache Skateboards.

Founded in 2002, Apache Skateboards is one of the earlier Native American-owned skateboard companies. Native artists working on the Apache Skateboard project with Miles include Razelle Bennally; Tracy Polk Jr.; Douglas Miles Jr.; Keith Secola; Reuben Ringlero; Irwin Lewis; Tony Steele; and Tashadawn Hastings. As Apache Skate Team, the group gives skating demonstrations, organizes skateboard contests and concerts, and curates art shows around the country, and especially on Indian reservations in the American Southwest.

"Painting on the skateboards ... opens up a whole new medium for me," Miles told Shade magazine. "My skateboards are both traditional and contemporary by design. Are they fine art or pop art? Why can't they be both?" He emphasizes Native American youth, Apache culture, and reservation lifestyles in his work. "You need to show 'Indian people' in the 21st century and not so much as museum pieces," Miles says.

Miles and Apache Skateboards have succeeded in finding new venues for art and skateboarding, blending the arenas of fine art, pop culture, and sport. They have successfully challenged outmoded categorization of Native American art based on anthropological perspectives. Together they have helped form the artist collective, Native Agents, and added visual artists Micah Wesley (Muscogee Creek-Kiowa), Rose B. Simpson (Santa Clara Pueblo-descent), and Yatika Starr Fields (Osage-Muscogee Creek-Cherokee) to the Apache Skateboard group. Native Agents curate "Pop Life" events, which combine visual art, music, and skateboarding, and are informed by the DIY ethic of punk culture.

Apache Skateboards work continually in film, photography, fine art, skateboarding, murals, multimedia projects, community projects, skate park planning, skateboard events, apparel design, television, film, youth conferences and speaking engagements. They produced a documentary, "Walk Like a Warrior: The Apache Skateboards Story," which was co-directed by Douglas Miles and Franck Boistel.

In 2008, Apache Skateboards collaborated with iPath Footwear to create the I-PACHE collection of sneakers, fitted hats, and T-shirts, all of which feature Douglas Miles' original designs.

In 2019, Miles and Apache Skateboards were featured in the documentary The Mystery of Now. In the film, Miles shares the socio-political context around the history that lead to life on the San Carlos Apache reservation. The Mystery of Now was featured in National Geographic's short film showcase.

== Notable exhibits ==
- 2011 Indian Ink II. Pravus Gallery. Phoenix, Arizona.
- 2010 Indian Ink I. Legends Santa Fe. Santa Fe, New Mexico.
- 2008 Apache: Douglas Miles. Officially Closed: Dead Letter Department. Los Angeles, California.
- 2005 Pop Life. Wilson College, Princeton University.
- 2005 Reservation Radical/Apache Skateboards: The Art of Douglas Miles. Santa Cruz Museum of Art and History. Santa Cruz, California.
- 2004–2007 Native Views: Influences of Modern Culture. Art Train USA. Traveling exhibit.
- 2004 Native Nollies: Skateboard Deck Art. Institute of American Indian Arts Museum, Santa Fe, New Mexico.
- 2003 Santa Fe Indian Market. SWAIA. First Place, Mixed Media.
- 2003 Heard Museum Indian Art Market. Heard Museum. Phoenix, Arizona. Won Best of Painting.

Apache Skateboards has worked with the Gila River Tribe (twice), Salt River Pima-Maricopa Indian Community, Red Lake Band of Chippewa Indians, Navajo Nation (twice), White Mountain Apache Tribe, San Carlos Apache Tribe, Chemehuevi Indian Tribe, Agua Caliente Band of Cahuilla Indians (twice), Tohono O'Odham Nation, Jicarilla Apache Nation, University of New Mexico-Gallup, Brown University, Harvard University, Peabody Essex Museum, and soon, the Mashantucket Pequot Museum.

External image
- Blood and Dirt collaboration. Click on images to enlarge.

== Collaboration with Susan Folwell ==
Douglas Miles collaborated with Santa Clara Pueblo potter Susan Folwell to make the "Blood and Dirt" collection, featuring painted pottery works by both artists, in contemporary social-commentary style.

== Collections ==
Several pieces of his work are in the collection of the National Museum of the American Indian. His paintings are in private collections in France, Germany, New York, and Los Angeles. Miles' and Apache Skateboard's art is also in the permanent collections of the Montclair Art Museum, Eiteljorg Museum, IAIA Museum, Warner Brothers Studios and The Eddie Basha Collection. He has a temporary exhibit at the Arizona Capitol Museum in Phoenix Az, running from Nov. 22nd to Jan. 22nd 2018.
