= Poeh Museum =

- Nah Poeh Meng
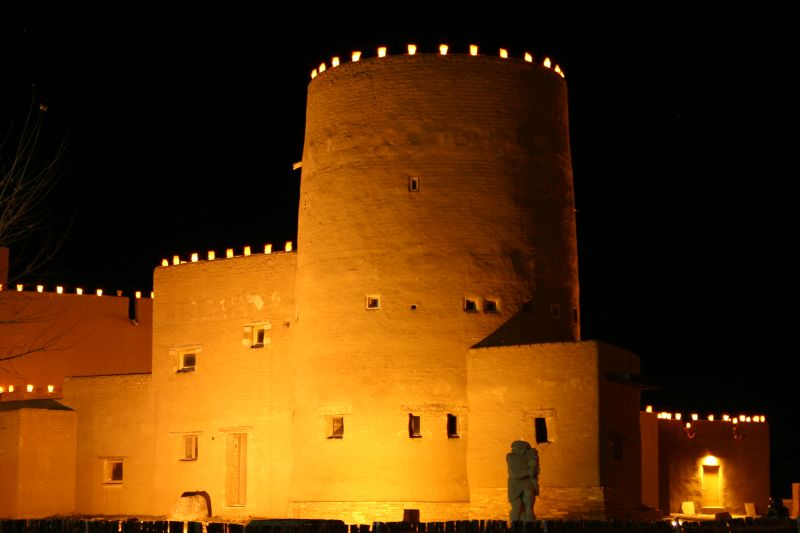
- 2005 photo
- Established: 1988
- Location: Pojoaque, New Mexico
- Coordinates: 35.8820°N 106.0119°W
- Type: Native American art museum
- Website: https://poehcenter.org/

The Poeh Museum (/poʊ/; from Tewa pʼôe, pronounced [pʼôː], 'pathway') is a museum in Pojoaque, New Mexico, U.S.A. The museum is located off U.S. Route 84. It is devoted to the arts and culture of the Puebloan peoples, especially the Tewas in the northern part of the state. It was founded by Pojoaque Pueblo in 1987, and is housed in the Poeh Center. The museum organizes changing exhibitions, and is a large repository of permanent artifacts and programs. The museum has run the Oral Histories Documentation, which is part of the museum's records, which involved participation of 38 Tewa elders providing stories about their lives; the information is available in both Tewa and English.

== Location ==
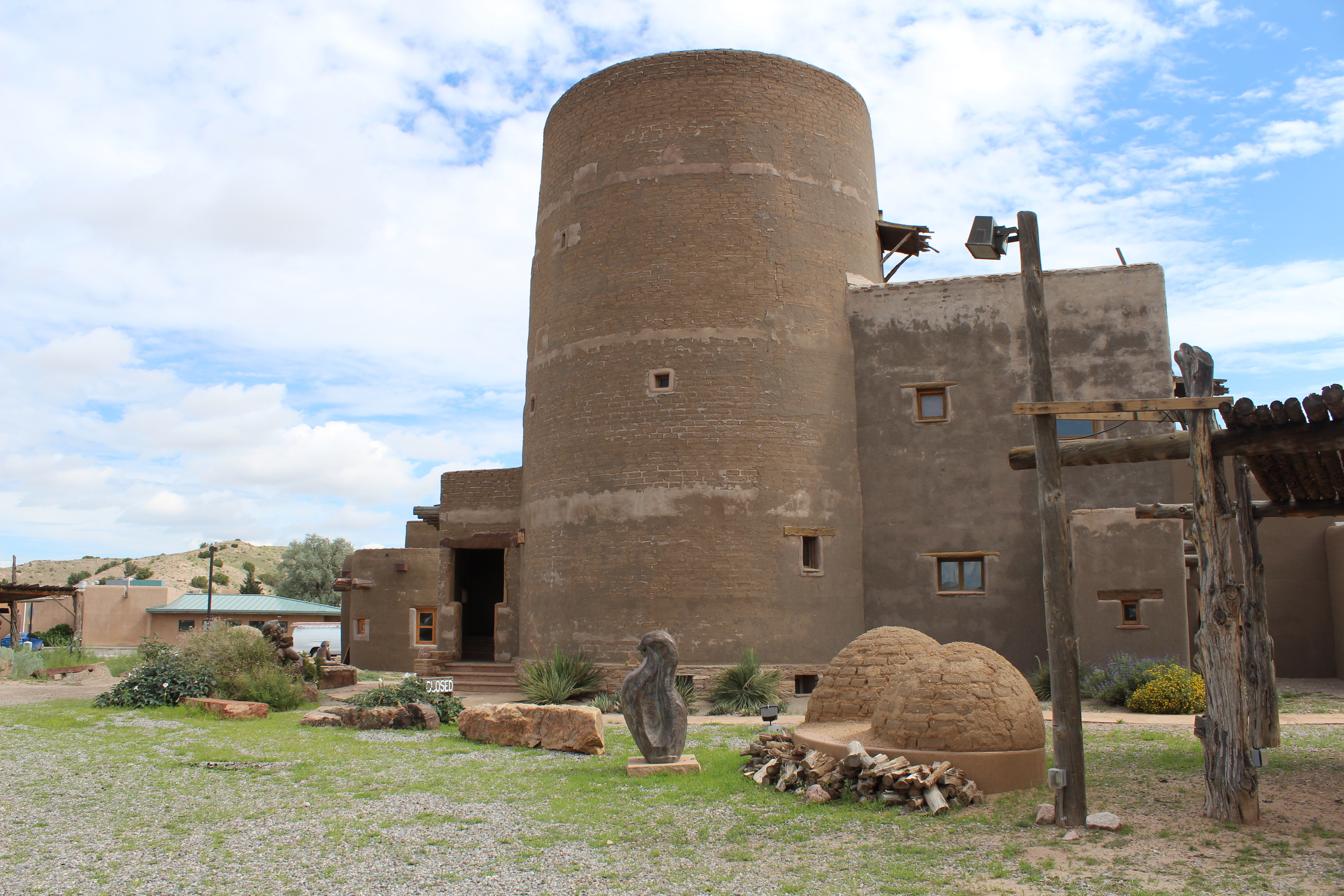
Poeh Museum & Cultural Center, 2014

The building is located off Highway 84. It is near Pojoaque Pueblo's Cities of Gold Casino and Hotel, and about 16 miles (26 km) from Santa Fe.

== History ==
The museum was established in 1987 by the Pojoaque Pueblo. Its mission is to promote the work of Pueblan artists and the culture of Pueblan people from pre-European period to the present age. Construction on the Poeh Center, where the museum is currently housed, started in 1992 with gaming revenue, and was completed in 2003. Funding was also provided for the museum's development by the Pojoaque Pueblo Construction Services Corporation, the New Mexico State Legislature, the Bay Foundation, the New Mexico Youth Conservation Corps, and the National Endowment for the Humanities. Joyce Begah-Foss served as curator in the 1990s, while Vernon Lujan has served as director in the 2000s.

== Poeh Center ==
The museum is located in the Poeh Center, which is widely recognized for its traditional pueblo architecture and building techniques. It also houses the Poeh Arts educational program, the Poeh Tower Gallery, and administrative offices. The Poeh Tower is the tallest adobe structure in New Mexico.

The main attraction in the museum is entered through a narrow hall which appears as a cave-like opening. A water channel passes through the entire length of the exhibits. The gallery is provided with a state-of-the-art security system, a Fire Suppression System including climate control system which was funded through a grant of US$109,217 by the National Endowment for the Humanities. In recognition of the Museum and Cultural center's contribution to the revival of culture and its propagation, Harvard University awarded the Poeh Center with the “Honoring Nations” award in 2000.

== Collections ==
There are roughly 600 artifacts of historical interest, which include paintings, jewelry, pottery, textiles, and sculptures of pre-European period to date. The pieces are by local people as well as by young artists of the six Tewa speaking tribes which helps students under the Poeh Arts Program to learn and adopt their culture. The exhibits consist of a number of figurines dressed with skins bordered with fur. The figurines are shown in a snow-covered landscape with hunting implements such as spears and atlatls. The figurines are made of very short stature with dark skin and with large wide eyes and round feet. These figurines were made by Roxanne Swentzell, a local clay sculptor.

The history of the Pueblan people is depicted in a sequence emerging from Sipapu, past hunting and gathering period, to the initial practices of agriculture, and then through the Spanish Entrada and finally ending in a modern-day living room of a family. The permanent exhibit, Nah Poeh Meng (from Tewa Napʼôemän, (Note: pronounced [nàpʼôːmæ̀ŋ]) transl. 'along the continuous path') was created by Mark Van Wickler and Iron Orca Studios of Washington State. It portrays pueblo history from the Pueblan viewpoint, and features sculptures by Swentzell and murals by Marcellus Medina of Zia Pueblo. This permanent exhibit which opened on 14 August 2005 is created in a floor area of 1,600 square feet (150 m^{2}). It provides recorded information through the voices of local people, provided in the seven different languages – Tewa, Tiwa, Towa, Keresan, Zuni, Spanish, and English spoken by the local people. The presentation is unique as it adopts visual arts as the medium, without any text.

=== Di Wae Powa (They Come Back): return of historic Tewa pottery ===
In 2012, the Poeh Cultural Center began conversations with the National Museum of the American Indian to develop a partnership focused on the return of pottery by Tewa artists that had been in the Smithsonian Institution's collection to its native homeland. In 2019, 100 pots were brought to the Poeh Museum where they are on long term loan. The origin of the pots are from six Tewa pueblos: Nambé, Ohkay Owingeh (formerly San Juan), Santa Clara, Pojoaque, San Ildefonso, Tesuque. The pots had been dispersed to various private and institutional collections in the mid-19th to early 20th centuries after having been "acquired" by private collectors and anthropologists. The pots, which represent various designs and styles are now on long term exhibit at the Poeh under a co-stewardship agreement.

== Services ==
The museum and cultural centre collections are also used for teaching and research by students. To promote this research activity, the museum has officially established links with many institutions such as the Southwest Association for Indian Arts (SWAIA), the Museum of Indian Arts and Culture, Santa Fe Indian School, the Institute of American Indian Arts, Northern New Mexico College, and the School for Advanced Research. An on-line access of archival, photographic, and permanent collection is also available for classroom training. This was facilitated under the National Endowment for the Arts Technology Program. This archive also provides information on the festivals of Pueblans, their dances, architecture, agriculture in addition to aspects related to economic development of Pojoaque. The museum archive holds about 10,000 photographs, ranging from early Edward S. Curtis prints to snapshots of contemporary Pueblan life. Approximately 5,000 of these images have been catalogued and digitized, and the remainder were expected to have been completed by the end of 2009. Its displays have included contemporary textiles, and these were complemented by weaving classes.

To encourage local talent, the museum also provides free studio space to any Native American artist.

The museum holds frequent art demonstrations and traditional dance festivals. The museum gift shop features art and gifts unique to Pueblo culture.
