= Eliza Naranjo Morse =

Native American artist

- Born: 1980 (age 45–46); New Mexico, U.S.
- Education: Parsons School of Design; Institute of American Indian Arts; Skidmore College (BA)
- Known for: Drawing, mixed-media installation, murals
- Movement: Contemporary Native American art
- Relatives: Nora Naranjo Morse (mother); Rose B. Simpson (cousin)

Eliza Naranjo Morse (born 1980) is an artist from the Santa Clara Pueblo (Khaˀpʼoe Ówîngeh) in New Mexico. She works with mediums ranging from clay and organic materials to drawing and mixed-media installation. She comes from a family of artists, frequently collaborating with her mother, Nora Naranjo Morse, and her cousin, Rose B. Simpson.

== Early life and education ==
Eliza Naranjo Morse was born in 1980 in New Mexico. She is of mixed heritage, the daughter of a Tewa mother and an Anglo father from Connecticut. Through her lineage, she is connected to the Sicneros, Sartori, Naranjo, and Morse families.

Morse studied figure drawing at the Parsons School of Design and also studied painting and figure drawing at the Institute of American Indian Arts (IAIA). She completed a bachelor's degree in art from Skidmore College.

== Career ==
Morse began creating artwork for sale at the age of 18. In 2008, she collaborated with her mother, Nora Naranjo Morse, and her cousin, Rose B. Simpson, on a piece for the Lucky Number Seven biennial at SITE Santa Fe. Their entry, titled Story Line, was a linear installation created from mixed media including nylon pantyhose, quilt batting, and sticks covered in various clays sourced from Pueblo lands.

Morse participated in an art project in Veracruz, in 2010, facilitated in association with the Smithsonian Institution. During this project, she spent a month working with local children to create large works of art using organic materials. In late 2014, she returned to collaborative performance art with the 5x5 Project in Washington, D.C. Alongside her mother and artist Alexis Elton, she performed a piece titled Digging, which was staged to highlight the value of physical labor.

In 2016, Morse opened a solo exhibition titled Forward at the IAIA Museum of Contemporary Native Arts (MoCNA). The exhibition featured a mural titled And We Will Live Off the Fat of the Land and included a "gargantuan parade" of anthropomorphized insect figures. The procession was led by a dung beetle, which was the only figure without a partner. For this exhibition, Morse incorporated personal materials such as garlic stalks she grew, feathers from a turkey she raised, and plastic collected from a landfill where she worked.

The Santa Fe Reporter selected Morse to create the cover art for their 2019 "Locals Guide" issue. The following year, the Wheelwright Museum of the American Indian commissioned her to create a mural for their staircase. Titled All Together. Making Our Way. Everyday. Medicine., the 30-foot mural spanned two stories.

Morse was a featured artist in the National Museum of Women in the Arts' exhibition New Worlds: Women to Watch 2024, where she presented the mural A Return to Relationship. In 2025, her work was exhibited alongside her mother's in the show In Creative Harmony: Three Artistic Partnerships at the Blanton Museum of Art.

In addition to her studio practice, Morse teaches art at the Kha'p'o Community School in Santa Clara Pueblo. She has exhibited at venues including MoCNA, Axle Contemporary, the Heard Museum, and the Chelsea Art Museum.

== Artistry ==
Morse's artistic practice encompasses a variety of media, including clay drawings, oil painting, sewing, and glow-in-the-dark imagery. She frequently incorporates natural materials into her work, such as using mud and clay to paint or create installation elements.

Thematically, her work often features anthropomorphized animals and insects depicted on journeys or pilgrimages.

== Personal life ==
As of 2016, she lived on reservation land and did not own a cell phone. By 2019, Morse resided in Española, New Mexico, where she was building a home on ancestral family land. Prior to focusing primarily on her art, she held different jobs, including working as a substitute teacher and at a landfill.
