= Always Becoming =

Artwork by Nora Naranjo-Morse

Coordinates: 38°53′17″N 77°0′59″W

- Artist: Nora Naranjo-Morse
- Year: 2007
- Type: Dirt, sand, straw, clay, stone, black locust wood, bamboo, grass, and yam vines.
- Location: National Museum of the American Indian, Washington, D.C.

Always Becoming is an artwork created in 2007 by Nora Naranjo-Morse, a Native American potter and poet. The artwork groups five sculptures made with natural materials, which allows them to gradually change over time. The National Museum of the American Indian selected and commissioned the artwork to be exhibited at one of its entrances in 2006.

== Description ==
The sculpture consists of five separate sculptures that make up a family. Grounded in figures from Santa Clara Pueblo oral tradition, the sculptures are named Father, Mother, Little One, Moon Woman, and Mountain Bird.

The sculptures were built in situ over the summer of 2007 by Nora Naranjo-Morse, her niece Athena Swentzell Steen and her husband Bill Steen, natural material sculptors, and the family of Don Juan Morales (Tepehuan) from the Mexican state of Durango. Many volunteers including museum staff and visitors also contributed to the construction.

Being strangers at the beginning of this journey, we came from distant places with the intent to build sculptures, and in the process built a family as well.

— Nora Naranajo-Morse, 2007

== Materials ==
The sculptures consist solely of natural materials, such as dirt, sand, straw, clay, stone, locust wood, bamboo, grass, and yam vines. These materials were deliberately chosen for their dynamic and changeable qualities.

== Dimensions ==
The five sculptures range in size from 7 feet 6 inches tall (~2.29 meters) to 16 feet (~4.84 meters) tall.

== History and location ==
On May 24, 2006, the National Museum of the American Indian announced that Naranjo-Morse had won its outdoor sculpture design competition. During the summer of 2007, on the grounds of the National Museum of the American Indian in Washington, D.C., Naranjo-Morse built a family of clay sculptures. The opening of these public works took place on September 1, 2007.

The sculptures are intended to disintegrate over time. The lives of the sculptures, from creation until they have decayed, are being documented by filmmaker Dax Thomas (Laguna/Acoma). As the sculptures disintegrate, the films of their lives will form a more permanent record of their existence, and are therefore an essential part of the artistic process and the work itself.

Native culture and the environment served as the inspiration for the sculpture design. 'Always Becoming' will reflect themes of growth and adaptation and represent indigenous peoples' unique relationship to the environment, ... The sculpture's metaphor of home and family not only conveys a universal theme to all peoples, but also enhances the visitors' experience that they have entered a Native place when they step foot [sic] on the museum grounds.

— Nora Naranajo-Morse, 2007

== See also ==
- List of public art in Washington, D.C., Ward 2
- Sculpture
