= Poeh Center =

Coordinates: 35.88238°N 106.01182°W

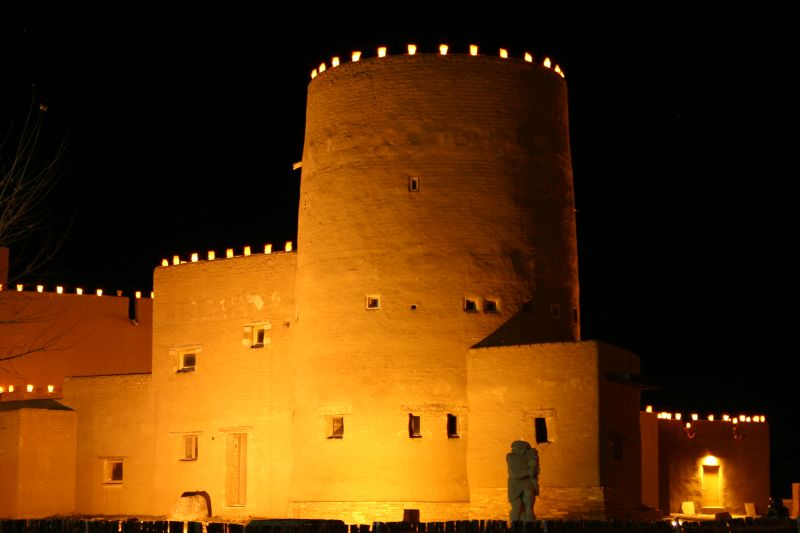
Poeh Center with Tower Gallery, 2005

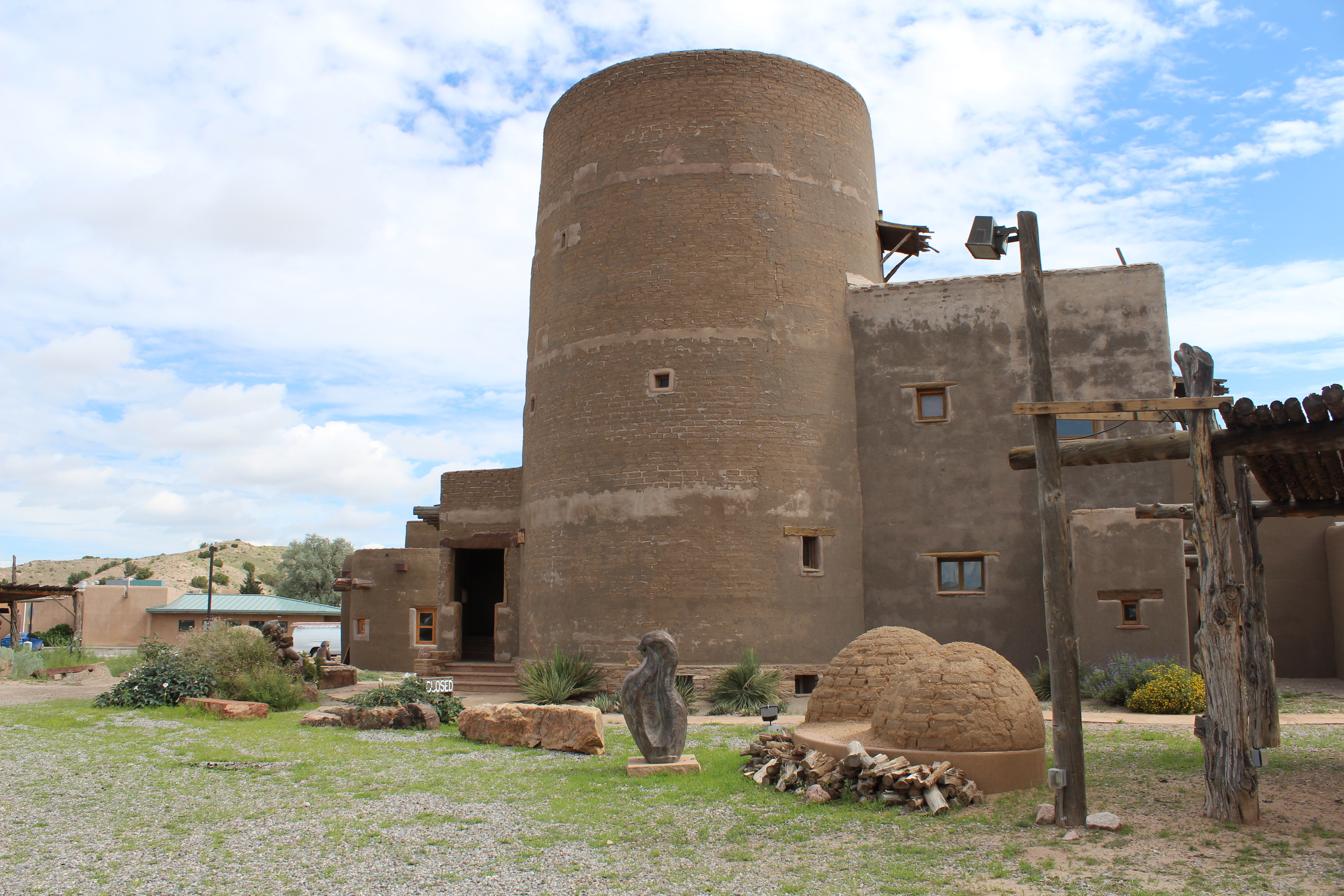
Poeh Museum & Cultural Center, 2014

Poeh Center (/poʊ/; from Tewa pʼôe, pronounced [pʼôː], 'pathway') is a cultural center in the U.S. state of New Mexico. Established by Pojoaque Pueblo, it is devoted to the arts and culture of the Puebloan peoples. The center is located off of U.S. Route 84. It is near Pojoaque Pueblo's Cities of Gold Casino and Hotel, and about 16 miles (26 km) north of Santa Fe. Construction started in 1992 with gaming revenue, and was completed in 2003.

The Poeh Center is widely recognized for its traditional pueblo architecture and building techniques. Built of adobe bricks and local wood products, it also houses the Poeh Museum, the Poeh Arts educational program, the Poeh Tower Gallery, and administrative offices. The Poeh Tower, currently occupied by sculptor Roxanne Swentzell, is the tallest adobe structure in New Mexico. The Poeh Center is the first tribally owned and maintained facility for cultural preservation of northern New Mexico and is compared to a Kiva-type building. It has traditional pueblo elements such as motifs in the interior, ceilings made of wooden beams, horno fireplaces and Pojoaque pottery. Its architecture is a blend of the New Mexico type pueblo architecture resembling some of the religious structures of Chaco Canyon and Mesa Verde. The building occupies a space of 4,930 square feet (458 m^{2}), and with plans for expansion to include a traditional pueblo plaza, and an amphitheater for performing arts and lectures related to Puebloan culture.
