= Rose Naranjo =

Tewa Puebloan potter (1917–2004)

- Aakonpóvi
- Born: 1917; Santa Clara Pueblo, New Mexico, United States
- Died: August 16, 2004 (aged 86–87); Santa Clara Pueblo, New Mexico, United States
- Other name: Gia Naranjo
- Occupations: Visual artist, potter
- Spouse: Michael Edward Naranjo (m.)
- Children: 10, including Jody Folwell, Rina Swentzell, Michael Naranjo and Nora Naranjo Morse

Rose "Gia" Naranjo (Tewa: Aakonpóvi; 1917 – August 16, 2004) was a Tewa potter and visual artist from Santa Clara Pueblo, New Mexico. She was the matriarch of the Naranjo Puebloan family of ceramists, artist and scholars. A former Southern Baptist missionary, she was named a "Living treasure" by the city of Santa Fe, New Mexico in 1994.

== Biography ==
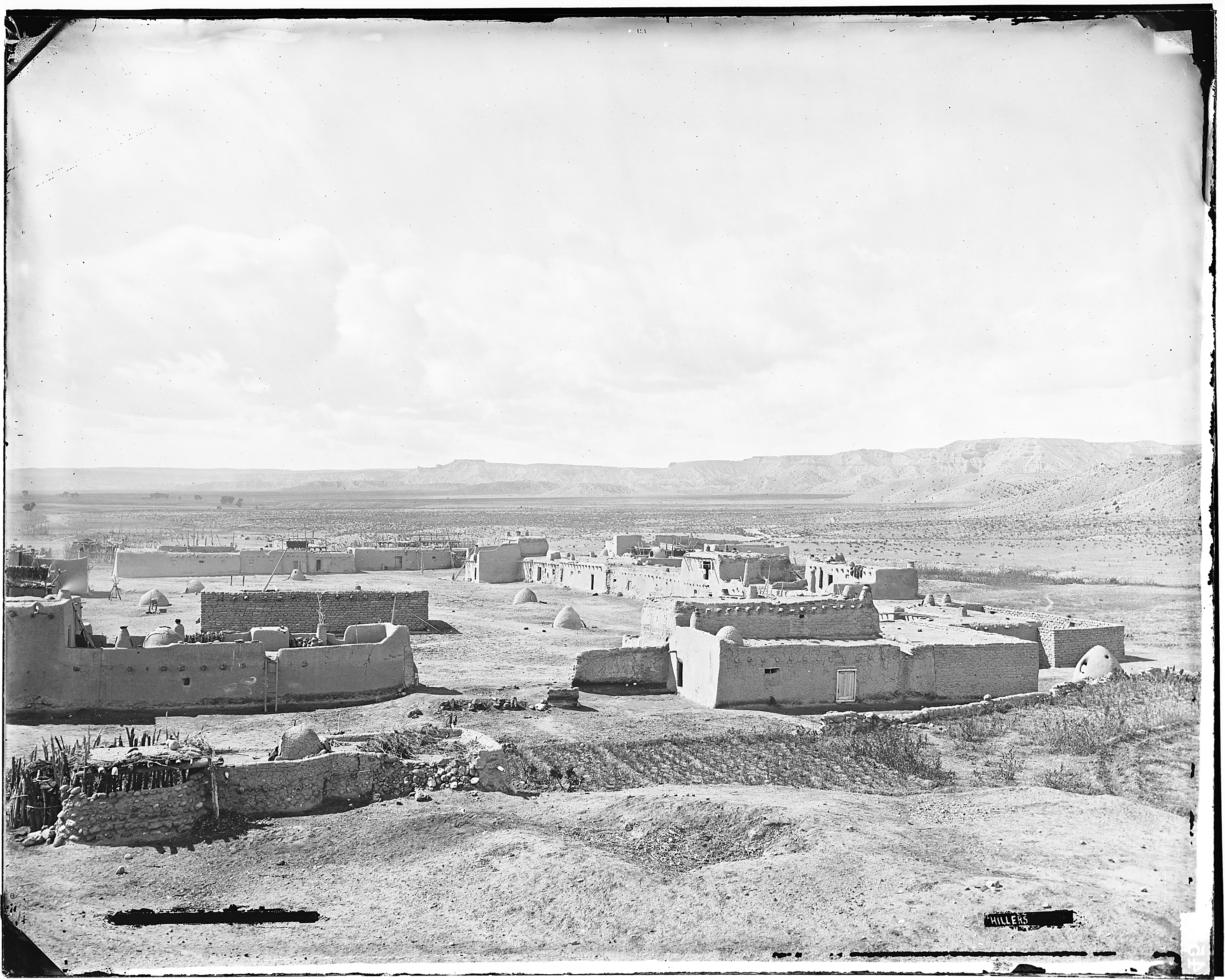
Santa Clara Pueblo, where Naranjo grew up

=== Early life and pottery ===
Rose Naranjo was born in 1917 in Santa Clara Pueblo, New Mexico. Her Tewa name, Aakonpóvi, translates to "Meadow flower". She was raised by her grandmother, Lupita, "Corn Tassel" a medicine woman and midwife after her parents died in the Spanish flu pandemic. Naranjo could trace her matrilineal heritage to Nampeyo, one of the first named Native American artists.

Naranjo began learning traditional Puebloan pottery as a teenager. She made her first pot aged 13 at her grandmother's home. Naranjo, as with other Tewa potters considered clay was a gift of Mother Earth, appreciating the material as having its own agency and being. She described clay as having a strength and personality, saying "clay is very selfish. It will form itself to what the clay wants to be." Working with the material, Naranjo claimed that a potter with "good intentions" could create designs that were a shared vision between the spirits of the potter and the clay. Creating pottery became a conversation between the potter and her material.

At age 18, she married her husband, Michael Edward Naranjo, a Southern Baptist minister. Together, they moved to Taos to become missionaries, working in Taos and Santa Clara Pueblo. Together, they conducted missionary work throughout the Southwest. Rose continued to craft traditional pots to support her family. Rose and Michael raised ten children together.

Example of a 19th-century Santa Clara Pueblo pottery design, similar to the style that Rose Naranjo would become known for

=== Matriarch ===
Rose and Michael Naranjo worked as missionaries until 1976, when they turned to pottery production full time. Naranjo passed on her skills as a potter to her children, as her grandmother did to her. She has been described as heading "one of the most distinguished and accomplished families of artists in North American art history". Alongside the arts, the family instilled the importance of education in their children. Several of their children became well known artists as well as Pueblo scholars. Their children include:

- Louise Cata Romero, Puebloan embroiderer of ceremonial montas, teacher and educator, developed a weaving dictionary.
- Edna K”apovi Romero, micaceous clay potter and artist and Pueblo educator
- Tito Naranjo, writer, hunting guide, sculptor, social worker, community activist and college teacher.
- Jody Folwell, contemporary political and social activist potter and artist
- Rina Swentzell, scholar of Pueblo architecture.
- Tessie Naranjo, scholar of the Tewa language.
- Michael Naranjo, blind sculptor after overcoming injuries suffered while serving in the Vietnam war.
- Dolly Naranjo Neikrug, Puebloan ceramicist and embroiderer
- Nora Naranjo Morse, contemporary artist and poet
- Cleo Naranjo

Naranjo became known as "Gia", or "Mother" within the Santa Clara Puebloan community. In 1994, she and her family were honored with the National Buddy Award, recognizing them for raising women who made a difference in education. In 1994, she was named a Santa Fe "Living Legend" for her contributions to art. In 1996, the Naranjo family was recognized by New Mexico Highlands University with The Distinguished Family Award, for their commitment to education and public service.

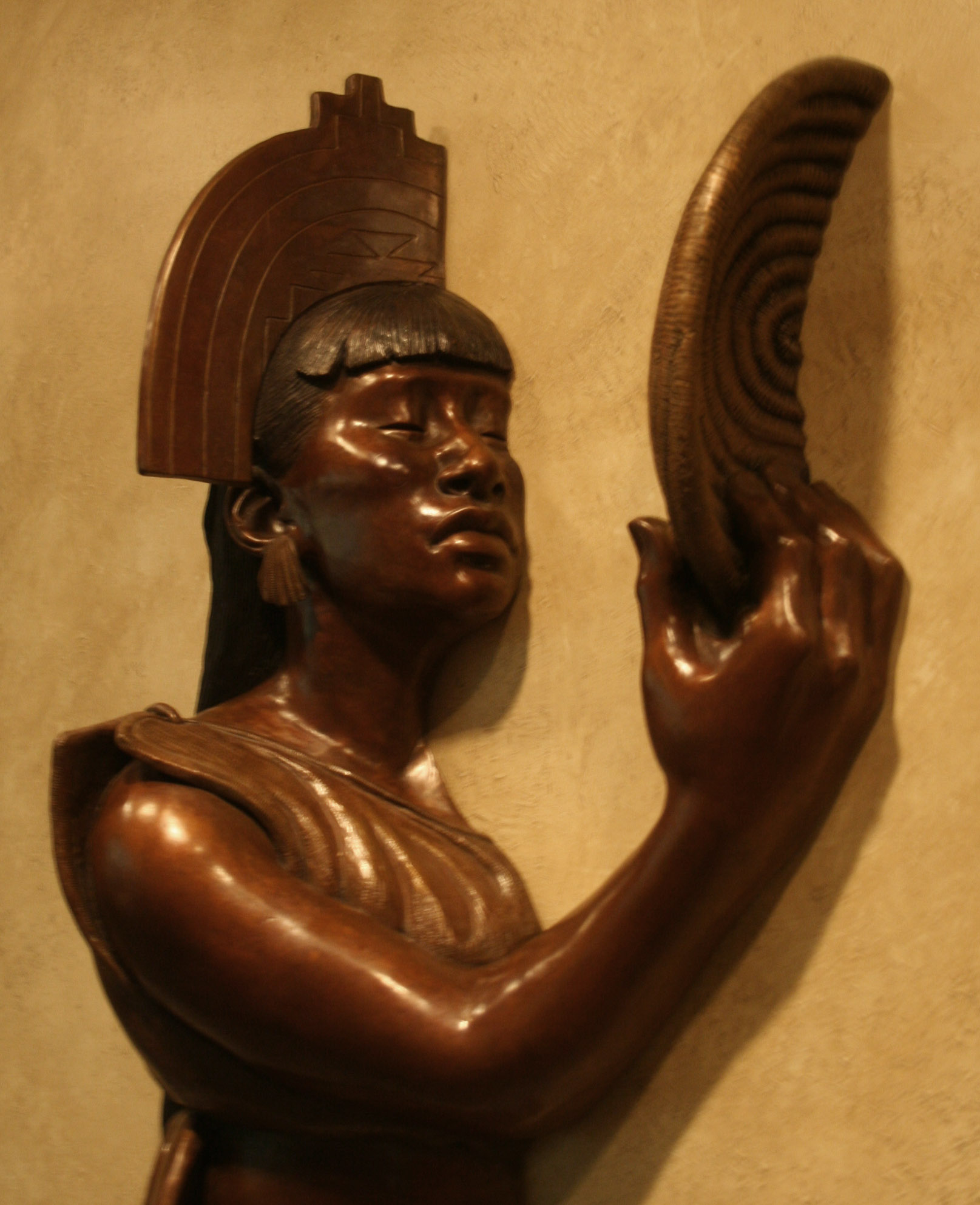
Bronze sculpture by Rose's granddaughter, Roxanne Swentzell

=== Later life and legacy ===
After Michael Naranjo's death in 1994, Rose returned to Santa Clara Pueblo. She continued to produce art well into her eighties. In 2001, the Southwest Association of the Arts recognized Rose Naranjo with a Lifetime Achievement Award for her lifetime contributions to Native American arts.

Naranjo died at home in Santa Clara Pueblo on August 16, 2004. She was 89 years old. After her death, her granddaughter Roxanne Swenzell recalled the impact on their family, "We all buzzed around her like drones around a queen bee. When she died, the hub of this family died with her". Naranjo left a lasting legacy with her art and devotion to Pueblo scholarship through her descendants. Her grandchildren and great-grandchildren include the artists Jody Naranjo, Susan Folwell, and Rose B. Simpson.

== Exhibitions and holdings ==
- "Lost and Found Traditions: Native American Art 1965-1985" organized by the American Federation of Arts.
- "Bowl" and "Wedding Jar", Nora Eccles Harrison Museum of Art, University of Utah
- "Santa Clara Pueblo blackware pottery", Booth Western Art Museum
- "Rose, Rina, Roxanne And Rose B. Simpson: Four Generations Of Santa Clara Ceramics" at Norton Museum Of Art
- "The Folwell Family: 5 Generations of Potters", Booth Western Art Museum
- “O’Powa O’Meng: The Art and Legacy of Jody Folwell.” The Fralin Museum of Art
