= Rose B. Simpson =

Santa Clara Pueblo artist

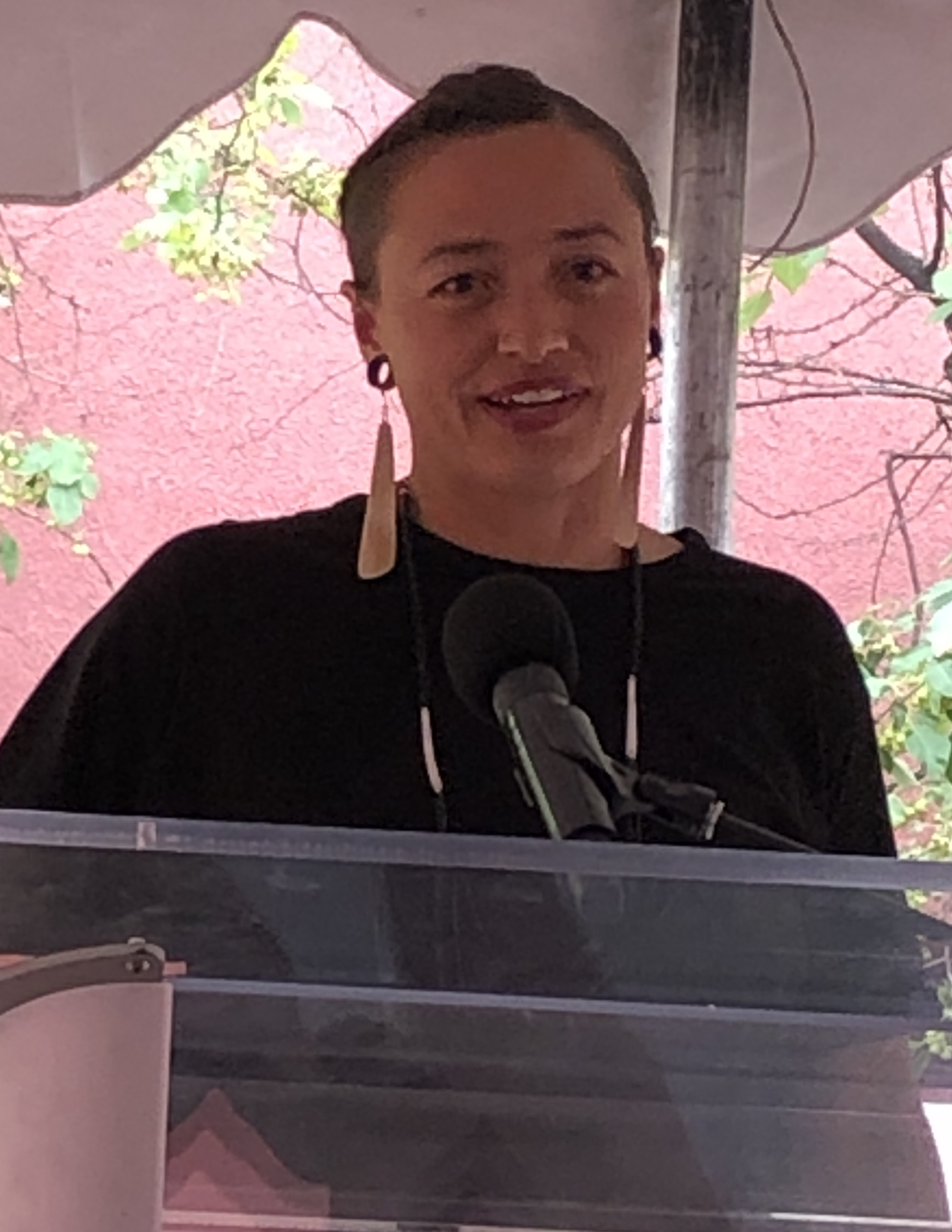
- Simpson in 2008
- Born: October 19, 1983
- Education: Institute of American Indian Arts (BFA, MFA), Rhode Island School of Design (MFA), Northern New Mexico College
- Known for: sculpture, ceramics
- Notable work: Maria
- Relatives: Eliza Naranjo Morse (cousin)
- Website: www.rosebsimpson.com

Rose B. Simpson (born 1983) of Tewa of Khaˀpʼoe Ówîngeh (Santa Clara Pueblo) and Euro-American ancestry is a mixed-media artist and sculptor who works in ceramic, metal, fashion, painting, music, performance, and installation. Simpson is the daughter of renowned Santa Clara Pueblo artist Roxanne Swentzell. She lives in Santa Clara Pueblo, New Mexico. Her work has been exhibited at SITE Santa Fe (2008, 2015); the Heard Museum (2009, 2010); the Museum of Contemporary Native Art, Santa Fe (2010); the National Museum of the American Indian, Smithsonian (2008); the Denver Art Museum; Pomona College Museum of Art (2016); Ford Foundation Gallery (2019); The Wheelwright Museum of the American Indian (2017); the Minneapolis Institute of Art (2019); the Savannah College of Art and Design (2020); the Nevada Museum of Art (2021); Whitney Museum of American Art (2023, 2024), and the Norton Museum of Art (2024).

== Early life ==
Growing up in Santa Clara Pueblo Rose B. Simpson was surrounded by creativity, as where she grew up was known for black/red ware pottery. Clay work is well practiced within her ancestral matrilineal lineage, with her late grandmother teaching pottery to all ten of her children. Simpson’s grandmother, Rina Swentzell, was an architect and potter. Her mother, Roxanne Swentzell, is a ceramic sculptor as well as an educator. When she was younger Simpson’s mother pulled her and her brother, Porter Swentzell, out of tribal day school to be homeschooled. Education rooted in relationship to land and community informed both of their life paths. Rose went on to pursue her creative practice at University, and her brother became an educator in Indigenous history.

Throughout her academic pursuits one of the experiences she cites as a pivotal point in her creative journey was school trip to Japan in 2010. It was on this trip where she learned about Japanese aesthetic tradition where art and craft are intertwined.

== Education ==
Simpson studied art at the University of New Mexico and the Institute of American Indian Arts, in Santa Fe, where she received her BFA degree in 2007. She went on to receive an MFA degree in ceramics from the Rhode Island School of Design in 2011; and another MFA degree in creative non-fiction from the Institute of American Indian Arts in 2018. She is also a graduate of the now defunct automotive science program at Northern New Mexico College in Española, New Mexico.

== Artwork ==
Simpson is a mixed-media artist whose artwork investigates the complex issues of past, present and future aspects of humanity's tenuous survival in our current ecological condition. Common themes that appear in her artwork include identity, maternity, and ancestry.

Although Simpson is an indigenous person, she aims to occupy her own space within the art world rather than be confined to expectations of what Native art should be. Simpson creates art that challenges western hierarchies of fine art by embracing cultural techniques and ideas passed down through her family heritage. She comes from a line of woman ceramic artists who passed their knowledge to her, and she still works alongside her mother, Roxanne Swentzell, and her young daughter when creating her art. Reflective of this matrilineal knowledge-sharing, femininity and maternity are communicated through her emphasis on creation—her artistic process. Simpson developed her own signature clay-making technique called “slap-slab,” in which she tears off pieces from very thin slabs of clay and assembles them together while intentionally leaving imperfections visible. To her, evidence of process is a deep truth she does not want to conceal, so fingerprints, marks, and painterly brushstrokes are clearly visible in her ceramic works. Her style as an artist is also inspired by the Japanese aesthetic tradition and kintsugi ("golden joinery") which spiritually represents self-love and forgiveness.

Simpson also creates performance art that she calls “transformances” because her intention with them is to transform herself and her audience. In her transformances, she works with other participants to take up space and march in public spaces wearing post-apocalyptic indigenous regalia to cause a transformation of perspective.

== Exhibitions ==
From August 30, 2025 – August 2, 2026, the Fine Arts Museums of San Francisco exhibited Rose B. Simpson: LEXICON. The “exhibition debuts Simpson’s second customized car, Bosque, a 1964 Buick Riviera painted in vibrant polychrome.” It was shown along with her first custom car, Maria.

In 2021, Simpson opened the large-scale solo exhibition "Countdown," at Savannah College of Art and Design.

In 2019 to 2020, her work was featured in the traveling exhibition, "Hearts of Our People". Simpson exhibited the sculptural work, Maria, an homage to the San Ildefonso Native American ceramicist, Maria Martinez in which she modified and customized a 1985 Chevy El Camino with San Ildefonso blackware (glossy black on matte black) pottery designs.

In 2018 to 2019 Simpson had a solo museum retrospective exhibition at the Wheelwright Museum of the American Indian, Santa Fe New Mexico, titled LIT: The Work of Rose B. Simpson. The museum produced a catalog of Simpson's work in conjunction with the exhibition.

In 2016 she had a solo exhibition, entitled Ground, at the Pomona College Museum of Art, California. In this exhibition she acted within the role of artist and curator. She mined the museum's collections to recontextualize historical objects among her own sculptures to "obliterate the western dichotomy of aesthetic versus utilitarian objects to propose an indigenous aesthetic of use and human connectedness'. Her intention in doing so was "to ground oneself is to reconnect physically to the earth, to root, to restore power, to build a strong foundation."

In 2016, her work was included in Con Cariño: Artists Inspired by Lowriders at the New Mexico Museum of Art. Her work was included in the 2024 exhibition Making Their Mark: Works from the Shah Garg Collection at the Berkeley Art Museum and Pacific Film Archive (BAMPFA).

In 2024 to 2025, the Cleveland Museum of Art exhibited Strata at the Ames Family Atrium.

== Selected works ==
=== Maria (2014) ===
In 2014, Simpson created Maria, a modified and customized 1985 Chevrolet El Camino. In many ways, the automobile sculpture is rooted in place. First, it is inspired by her time living in Española, New Mexico, which is considered to be the lowrider capitol of the world. Through its title, Maria also tells a story of the potter Maria Martinez (San Ildefonso Pueblo), who is known for creating the “black-on-black style” which Simpson incorporated on the car's exterior by using matte black paint as the base and glossy black paint for the traditional decorative designs. Finally, her choice of a car as the medium is a reflection of the time she spent studying automotive technology at Northern New Mexico College.

=== Dream House (2022) ===
In October of 2022, Simpson created Dream House, and it was displayed in the Fabric Workshop and Museum through 2022 to May 2023. In this installation Simpson wanted to depict imagery, and invoke a feeling, of home. The installation was divided into fives spaces, each one expressing an experience of home (Santa Clara Pueblo) for Simpson. It invited those visiting into a more interactive environment, allowing them to perceive Simpson's personal growth, as well as question their own. Each room displayed a different area of growth, containing either video, ceramics, windows, fabric art and much more. The last room in the installation was an open space where visitors could sit and reflect on what they saw.

=== Counterculture (2023) ===
In 2023, Simpson created a site-specific sculpture installation to be shown at the Field Farm in Williamstown, Massachusetts. The sculpture consists of 12 concrete-cast human-like figures that each stand 10 feet tall. The hollow-eyed figures are adorned with ceramic and found objects. Counterculture is a site-specific sculpture because the Field Farm is located on the ancestral homeland of the indigenous Mohican people, who were forcibly displaced by settler colonialism. Simpson created this series of beings to represent ancestors who act as witnesses to the landscape and its history. They also stand as a way of remembering the indigenous people who once inhabited the land.

== Collections ==
- Clay Art Center, Port Chester, New York
- Cleveland Museum of Art
- Denver Art Museum
- Hood Museum of Art
- Institute of Contemporary Art, Boston
- Metropolitan Museum of Art
- Museum of Fine Arts, Boston
- Museum of Modern Art
- Portland Art Museum
- Princeton University Art Museum
- Peabody Essex Museum
- San Francisco Museum of Modern Art
- Whitney Museum of American Art

== Awards, fellowships and residencies ==
- 2023 – Appointed member of Institute of American Indian Arts Board of Trustees by president Biden
- 2021 – Joan Mitchell Fellowship from the Joan Mitchell Foundation
- 2021 – Production and Exhibition Grant, Via Art Fund, Boston, MA
- 2021 – Residency, The Fabric Workshop and Museum, Philadelphia, PA
- 2021 – Residency, Tamarind Institute, Albuquerque, NM
- 2020 – Residency, Anderson Ranch Arts Residency, Snowmass, CO
- 2020 – President's Award for Art and Activism, Women's Caucus for Art, Chicago, IL
- 2017 – Fellowship from the National Parks Foundation for a residency at Aztec Ruins National Monument
- 2013 – National Artist Fellowship, Native Arts & Cultures Foundation

== Personal life ==
Simpson comes from a long line of Santa Clara Pueblo ceramic artists, including her mother Roxanne Swentzell, her grandmother Rina Swentzell, her great-aunt Nora Naranjo-Morse, her great-grandmother Rose Naranjo and her great-uncle Michael Naranjo. Her father is the sculptor, Patrick Simpson.

== Musical career ==
For a number of years, Simpson was the lead singer in the Native American punk band, Chocolate Helicopter. She also played in the hip-hop band, Garbage Pail Kidz.
