= Jody Naranjo =

American Tewa pottery maker

- Education: Institute of American Indian Arts
- Known for: Pottery
- Style: Traditional Tewa pottery, contemporary interpretations
- Movement: Native American Arts and Crafts Movement
- Children: 3
- Mother: Dolly Naranjo
- Awards: Santa Fe Indian Market – Jody Naranjo; 2011 First Prize – Pottery Santa Fe Indian Market – Jody Naranjo; 2022 First Prize – Pottery Eiteljorg Museum Indian Market – Jody Naranjo; 2007 Best in Show

External images
- Jody Naranjo at Indian Market, 2009
- Frogs and Butterflies, 2009

Jody Naranjo is a contemporary Tewa pottery maker from the Santa Clara Pueblo, New Mexico in the United States. She comes from a family of traditional Tewa potters. She learned the craft of pottery from her mother, Dolly Naranjo, and other female relatives. She attended the Institute of American Indian Arts. Naranjo was selling her artwork at age fifteen at the New Mexico History Museum. Her style is identifiable and showcases her keen sense of humour. Jody has 3 daughters and maintains her connections to her heritage and friends. She is represented by Blue Rain Gallery in Santa Fe.

== Technique ==
She uses traditional methods to make her pottery, including digging the clay from pueblo lands and processing the raw clay. She sifts, soaks, and strains the raw clay in into pottery-grade clay. She uses the coiling and pit firing to make her pots. Images of women, which she calls "pueblo girls," and animals, are a common themes in her artworks. She participates in the Santa Fe Indian Market. She won first prize in pottery at the Market in 2011 and 2022. She has served as an artist-in-residence at the Eiteljorg Museum of American Indians and Western Art. In 2007 she won best in show at the Eiteljorg's Indian Market. Her work has been exhibited at the Heard Museum.

== See also ==
- Nora Naranjo-Morse, Jody Naranjo's aunt
- Jody Folwell, her aunt
- Roxanne Swentzell, her cousin
- Rose Naranjo, matriarch of the Naranjo family of potters and ceramicists
