= Margaret and Luther Gutierrez =

American potters

Margaret Gutierrez (born 1936) and Luther Gutierrez (1911–1987) were a brother and sister team of Native American potters from Santa Clara Pueblo, New Mexico, United States. They descended from several generations of potters and continue the polychrome style of painting made famous by their parents Lela and Van Gutierrez. At age twelve, Margaret began apprenticing as a potter with her mother. Luther's father taught him where to find, and how to process the clay. Margaret and Luther began making pottery together in the 1960s.

Margaret and Luther's painted slips included unique color combinations. Their first creations included polychrome bowls, jars and wedding vases with designs centered on the Avanyu (water serpent), rain, clouds and lightning and sky bands. In the 1970s they came up with their original idea of making polychrome caricatures of animals and other smaller figurines rather than the jars made famous by their parents. These were painted with the same slips and pigments used on earlier pieces.

Margaret and Luther participated in the Seven Families in Pueblo Pottery exhibition at the Maxwell Museum of Anthropology, University of New Mexico in 1974, and the Popovi Da Studio of Indian Arts, gallery show in Santa Fe in 1976.

After Luther died Margaret continued to make pottery with the assistance of Luther's daughter Pauline but Pauline died shortly thereafter. Margaret now works with her great-niece Stephanie Naranjo. Today, the manufacture of famous multicolored polychrome is waning. Luther's son Paul, his wife Dorothy, and their son Gary, make blackware mudhead figures and animalitos (small animals) in large quantities.

== Works ==
This list is incomplete, you can help by expanding it with certified entries.

- Ceramic plaque or dish, 20th century, 3/4 x 5 x 3 7/8 in. (1.91 x 12.7 x 9.84 cm), MIA collection, Minneapolis, MN.

== References and further reading ==
- Allan Hayes and John Blom - Southwestern Pottery: Anasazi to Zuni. 1996.
- Maxwell Museum of Anthropology - Seven Families in Pueblo Pottery. 1974.
- Schaaf, Gregory - Pueblo Indian Pottery: 750 Artist Biographies. 2000.
- Rick Hill and W. Jackson Rushing - St. James Guide to Native North American Artists. 1997.

Specific
