= Anita Louise Suazo =

- Born: May 13, 1937 (age 89)
- Known for: Ceramics

Anita Louise Suazo (born May 13, 1937) is a Native American potter from Santa Clara Pueblo, New Mexico, United States.

== Background ==
She is the daughter of Ernesto Tapia and noted potter Belen Tafoya Tapia (1914–1999). Anita's mother Belen was one of the innovators of finely crafted polychrome redwares. She was a first cousin to Margaret Tafoya. Growing up in a family of traditional potters, Anita began learning Santa Clara pottery techniques as a child from her mother.

== Artwork ==
She works with her husband Joseph who helps her dig clay from the soil near Santa Clara. Her pots are made using the traditional, free hand coiling technique, polishing stones and native clays.

Anita makes carved redware and stoneware, polychrome redware, black melon pots and carved two-tone black on black pottery. She carves or decorates her pots with water serpents, rain clouds, kiva steps, feathers and other prehistoric stylized designs.

== Awards and honors ==
Anita is recognized as a master potter. Since 1979, she has consistently won awards at the Santa Fe Indian Market and the Eight Northern Pueblos Indian Arts and Crafts Shows. In 1985, she participated in the Sid Deusch Gallery show in New York with Margaret Tafoya and 42 other Santa Clara potters. In 1986 she received the Jack Hoover Memorial Award for excellence in Santa Clara pottery. She has taught workshops and given demonstrations on traditional Native American pottery techniques at the University of New Mexico and the University of California at Davis. Her pottery can be found in collections of the Heard Museum in Phoenix, the Smithsonian Institution, the Millicent Rogers Museum in Taos, the Museum of New Mexico in Santa Fe, and in collections around the world.
