= Santa Clara Indian Reservation =

Indian reservation in New Mexico, US

Coordinates: 35°58′42″N 106°12′18″W

Location of Santa Clara Pueblo

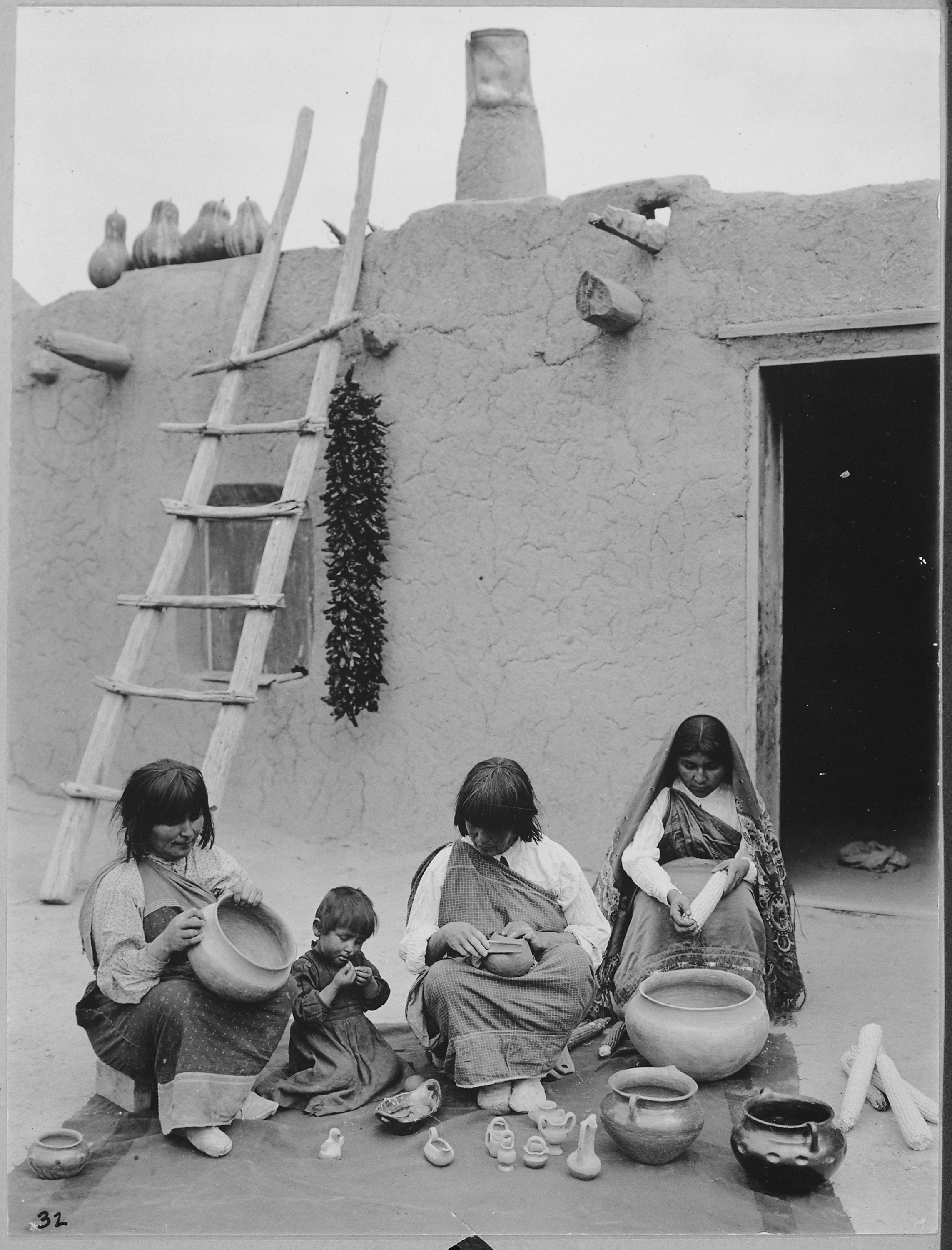
Indians of Santa Clara Pueblo, New Mexico, making pottery, 1916

The Santa Clara Pueblo (Tewa: Khaˀpʼoe Ówîngeh) is an Indian reservation in north-central New Mexico, United States. It is the homeland of a branch of the Pueblo people (Tewa) of Native Americans. The reservation lies on 76.73 sq mi (198.729 km^{2}) of southern Rio Arriba, northeastern Sandoval, and northern Santa Fe Counties. It includes the community (census designated place) of Santa Clara Pueblo, as well as parts of three other communities. The total population living on Santa Clara Pueblo land as of the 2000 census was 10,658 persons. Most of the population lives in the northeastern corner of the reservation. The largest community on reservation land is the city of Española, although a part of the city is not on reservation territory.

== Communities ==
- Española (most, population 5,681)
- Santa Clara Pueblo
- Santa Cruz (part, population 266)
- Sombrillo (part, population 157)
