= Susan Folwell =

Native American artist (born 1970)

Susan Folwell (born 1970) is a Native American artist from Santa Clara Pueblo, New Mexico, known for her work in the ceramic industry. Her work ties in Native designs and history and has been used by Folwell to demonstrate her viewpoints on society and politics. Folwell has been described by the Heard Museum as an "innovator in Pueblo pottery".

Her work is held in several permanent collections worldwide and Folwell is also a member of the Southwestern Association for Indian Arts, where she holds the chair position of the arts committee.

== Biography ==
Folwell was born in 1970 and raised in Santa Clara Pueblo. Her family was known for their participation in the art world, as her grandmother, Rose Naranjo, and mother, Jody Folwell, were established potters and her father was a painter. Her sister Polly Rose Folwell would also go on to become a potter as well. Folwell has recalled having to help dig up clay and chop fire wood to fire the pieces that were shaped before being allowed to go out with her friends. She remembers feeling like it was a chore to participate in any form of using clay and was not fond of any part of it.

She became interested in pottery after her mother gave her a lump of clay and Folwell chose to make a snake. The snake was a simple coil of clay shaped like an "S" and Folwell's mother made some tweaks to the clay to give it more character, which helped it sell for two dollars. During her teens Folwell attended an arts high school in Idyllwild, California, where she took a ceramics class. She has stated that this was when she realized how deeply the traditions of her Pueblo life and Pueblo life in general affected her. She has also noted that she wanted to maintain the traditions of Pueblo art and showcase it from a contemporary perspective. She went on to attend classes at the Center of Creative Studies in Detroit, Michigan, where she studied design and photography.

Folwell married Davison Koenig, who was an executive director and curator of the Couse-Sharpe Historic Site; Couse was one of the Taos artists that Susan Folwell was inspired by in her collection Peering Through Taos light that she collaborated on with her mom. Together, Folwell and Koenig moved to Taos, where she spent three years studying paintings done by the Taos Society of Artists. According to Folwell, there is a resemblance of their work to Edward Curtis due to the feeling of romanticism in the works.

Folwell's style of creation is predominantly sculptures, which she creates using the custom firing methods from the Santa Clara Pueblo.

== Select artworks ==
=== Vanishing (2017) ===
Follwell created Vanishing as part of a collection she collaborated on with her mother Jody, which they called Peering Through Taos Light. Of the piece Folwell has stated that its purpose was to take one of the artworks of E. Irving Couse and recreate it as a reflection in her clay, showing the way of old giving way to new. The piece depicts a Native man looking out through an opening in some trees and seeing his world built over in order to become more contemporary and move along with modern day.

=== The Wedding (2017) ===
Also a part of the Peering Through Taos Light collection, The Wedding was also created to reflect upon Couse's work. Folwell aligned the work with how she was feeling about the piece. In order to accomplish this she left the piece's faces unfinished, as she felt that viewers would be able to pick up on the tension between the two newlyweds without requiring any facial expressions.

=== Corn Maiden Jar (2014) ===
The Corn Maiden Jar is a ceramic piece and part of her Corn Maiden series that she collaborated on with Les Namingha. The purpose of the collection is to portray the importance of corn in Pueblo ceremonial life. It has been compared to the retablo of Our Lady of Guadalupe in Santa Cruz, New Mexico, as it draws on features from the Virgin Mary such as the delicate hands. The piece uses corn husks as a headdress around the body and head, which is intended to show the importance of corn in the lives of the Native community.

=== Pow Wow Girl ===
The Pow Wow Girl is a ceramic piece that is featured in an exhibit in the Phoenix International Airport. It depicts a Native woman wearing a headband with tribal designs. She is shown making a comment about a gentleman who thinks she is good-looking and asking if he would be at the pow wow that night. The text bubble on the piece is using text speak and internet slang such as "LOL", "2NITE", "@", and many exclamation points and question marks in a row.

=== Photo-Op Jar (2014) ===
Created in 2014, Photo-Op Jar is a ceramic artwork created by Folwell to be a part of her Cry Baby series. This piece features Hopi women reversing the roles with tourists and watching the tourists instead. It is meant to be a play on Edward Curtis having taken several photos of Hopi women.

== Select exhibitions ==
=== Solo exhibitions ===
- Harwood Museum of Art, Scottsdale, Santa Fe: Through the Looking Glass (July 5, 2019 - January 5, 2020)
- Museum of Art and Design, New York, NY
- Arizona State Museum, Tucson, AZ (2011) The Pottery Project: Potters in the Vanguard
- Mesa Arts Center, Mesa, AZ (2010) Transcending Traditions in Contemporary American Indian Art
- King Galleries, Scottsdale, AZ (1999, 2000, 2006, 2007, 2008, 2009, 2010)
- Stedelijk Museum - Hertogenbosch, Netherlands (2006) Free Spirit: The New Native American Potter
- Heard Museum, Phoenix, AZ (2004) Breaking the Surface: Carved Pottery Techniques and Design
- Museum of Art and Design, NY, NY (2002) Changing Hands: Art Without Reservation
- Philadelphia Museum of Art, Philadelphia, PA. (2002) PMA Craft Show
- Lawrence Arts Center, Lawrence, KS (1999) One Woman Show
- Charles King Gallery, Scottsdale, AZ (2018) Taos Light: Maidens to Mantas

=== Group exhibitions ===
- King Galleries, Scottsdale, AZ (2015) Corn Maiden Series: a collaboration with Les Namingha
- King Galleries, Scottsdale, AZ (2017) Peering Through Taos Light: a collaboration with mom Jody Folwell
- Heard Museum, Phoenix, AZ (2009) Mothers & Daughters: Stories in Clay: a collaboration with mom Jody Folwell, and sister Polly Rose Folwell
- Brinton Museum, The Spiritual Nature of Earth, Hide, and Metal: a collaboration with mom Jody Folwell, James F Jackson, and JhonDuane
- Vassar College, Poughkeepsie, NY (2006) Forms of Exchange: Art of Native Peoples from the Edward J. Guarino Collection
- National Museum of the American Indian, Washington D.C. (2005 - 2006) Osama Ken Barbie

== Permanent collections ==
- Museum of Art and Design, New York, NY
- Heard Museum, Phoenix, AZ
- Denver Art Museum, Denver, CO
- Montclair Museum, Montclair, NJ
- National Museum of the American Indian, Washington, D.C.
- Stedelijk Museum, Netherlands
- de Young Museum, San Francisco, CA
- Eiteljorg Museum, Indianapolis, IA
- Rockwell Museum of Western Art, Corning, NY
- Arizona State Museum, Tucson, AZ
- Phoenix Sky Harbor International Airport, Phoenix, AZ
- Philbrook Museum, Tulsa, OK
- Hallmark Permanent Collection, Kansas City, KS
- Spencer Museum of Art, Lawrence, KS
- Augustana College, Rock Island, IL
- Houston Museum of Fine Arts, Houston, TX
- Harwood Museum of Art, Santa Fe, New Mexico
- Wheelwright Museum, Santa Fe, New Mexico

== Honors and awards ==
- Conrad House Award at Heard Museum Guild Indian Fair and Market
- Best of Division 1st Place at Eiteljorg Museum Indian Market and Fair
- Best of Division 1st Place at Southwest Indian Art Fair
- Best of Division 1st Place at SWAIA, Santa Fe Indian Market 6 times in the years 1996, 1999, 2000, 2001, 2003, 2011
- Best of Division 1st Place at Heard Museum Guild Indian Fair and Market
- Governor's Arts Award at Phoenix Sky Harbor International Airport
- Best of Show at Eight Northern Indian Pueblos Arts and Crafts Fair
- Best of Non-Traditional Pottery at Santa Fe Indian Market
- Best Contemporary Pottery at the Heard Museum Indian Market
