= Paul Speckled Rock =

Native American artist (1952–2017)

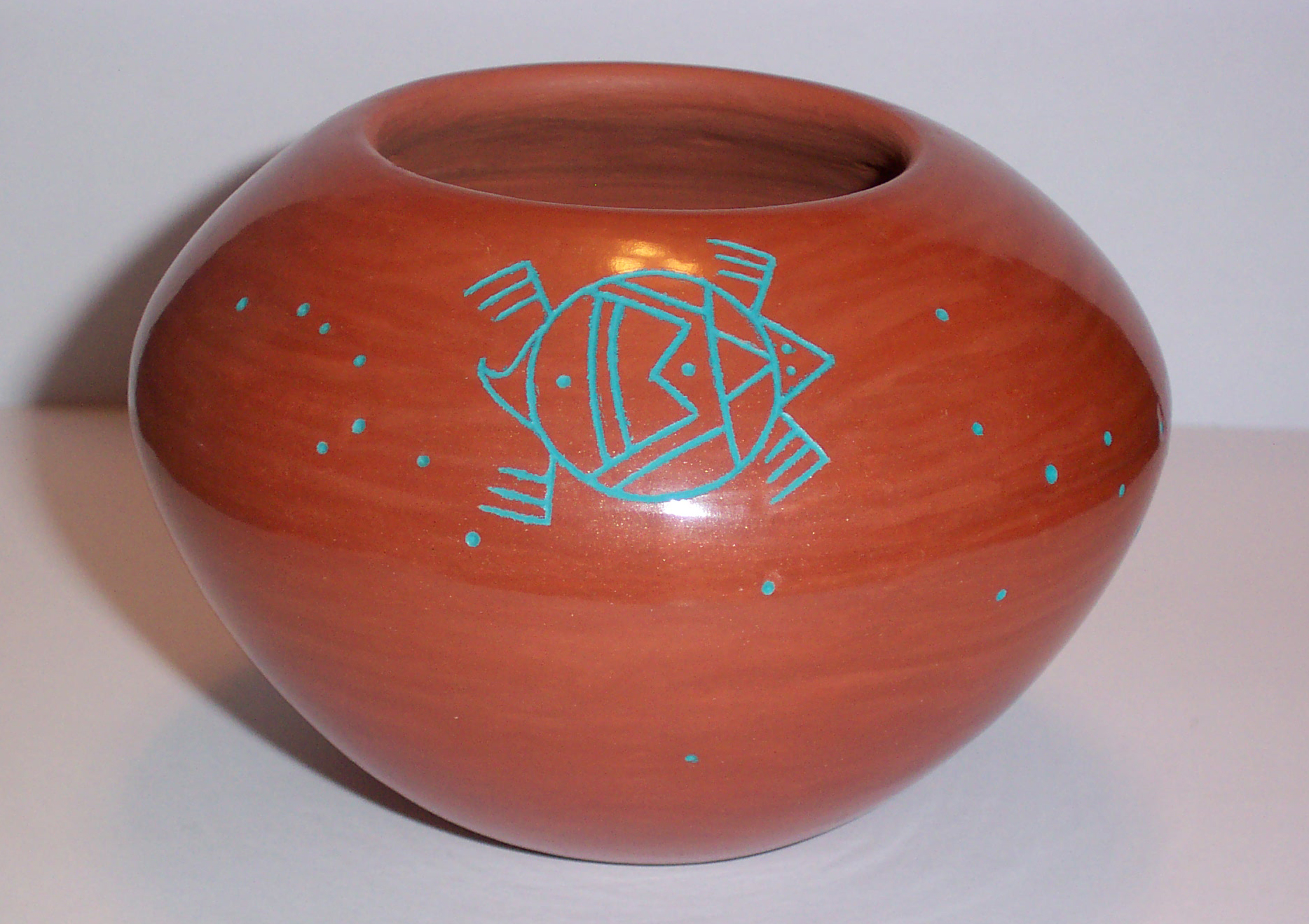
- Red clay pot with incised turquoise turtle motif by Paul Speckled Rock
- Born: Paul Joseph Tafoya; February 6, 1952
- Died: 2017 (aged 64–65)
- Known for: Painting, sculpture, pottery

Paul Joseph "Speckled Rock" Tafoya (1952 – 2017) was a Native American artist who was noted for his paintings, bear fetishes, bronze sculptures of Native American dancers, and redware and blackware pottery. A member of the Tewa and a resident of the Santa Clara Pueblo in New Mexico, Paul was the owner of the Merrock Galeria, which featured the work of contemporary pueblo artists.

== Personal life ==
Born on February 6, 1952, Paul Joseph Speckled Rock Tafoya was the son of Paul and Tonita Tafoya. Paul Tafoya Sr., was a welder who served as the governor of Santa Clara Pueblo from 1964 to 1983. Paul Speckled Rock was a brother of Kenneth and Ray Tafoya, a nephew of Angela Baca, and a grandson of Severa Tafoya, all of whom were noted Santa Clara Pueblo potters. Paul graduated from Espanola High School in 1970 and legally changed his name from Tafoya to Speckled Rock at that time. He then attended the National Electronics Institute, where he received an apprenticeship in architectural engineering.

In February 1972, Paul married Rosemary "Apple Blossom" Lonewolf, a noted potter who was a daughter of Joseph Lonewolf and niece of Grace Medicine Flower. Paul and Rosemary's son Adam Speckled Rock, who is a potter in his own right, was born in November 1972. At this time, Paul decided to turn his attention to art. He also worked weekends as a tribal policeman at the Santa Clara Pueblo from 1973 to 1976 to support his family.

Following a divorce from Rosemary, Paul married Mercedes Rivera, a contemporary potter who opened her own studio in 1998. Paul subsequently married Rosalda Vigil, daughter of Ernesto Vigil, a municipal judge for the City of Espanola. Paul Speckled Rock died in early 2017.

== Artistic creations ==
Paul Speckled Rock began his artistic career in 1973 by producing a series of small paintings, usually featuring pueblo motifs. His medium was typically acrylic on board. In 1977, he began making bronze sculptures, most commonly featuring Native American warriors in ceremonial dress. He also produced his signature bear fetishes. He began making pottery in 1983, having been inspired by his grandmother, Severa Tafoya. Much of his pottery consists of traditional redware, but he was also known for creating pottery with unusual shapes, often decorated using the sgraffito technique. A photo of Paul at work in his studio in 2012 was posted on Flickr by one of his visitors.

=== Awards ===
| Year | Award |
|---|---|
| 1984 | First, Second, Third Place, Gallup Inter-Tribal Ceremonial |
| 1984 | First Place, New Mexico State Fair |
| 1991 | Second Place, jar, Santa Fe Indian Market, Santa Fe, New Mexico |
| 1992 | Third Place, other bowl, Indian Market, Santa Fe, New Mexico |

=== Exhibitions ===
| Year | Venue |
|---|---|
| 1972 | New Mexico State Fair, Albuquerque, New Mexico |
| 1972-1981 | American Indian Art Show, Denver, Colorado |
| 1972-1984 | Gallup Inter-tribal Indian Ceremonial, Gallup, New Mexico |
| 1973 | Deer Dancer, University of Denver, Denver, Colorado |
| 1985 | Sid Deusch Gallery, New York, New York (gallery show with Margaret Tafoya) |
| 1985-1998 | Indian Market, Santa Fe, New Mexico |

Additional exhibitions included: Heritage Center Inc. Collection, Red Cloud Indian School, Pine Ridge, South Dakota; Heard Museum Guild Indian Fair and Market, Phoenix, Arizona; and the Wheelwright Museum of the American Indian, Santa Fe, New Mexico.

== Business activities ==
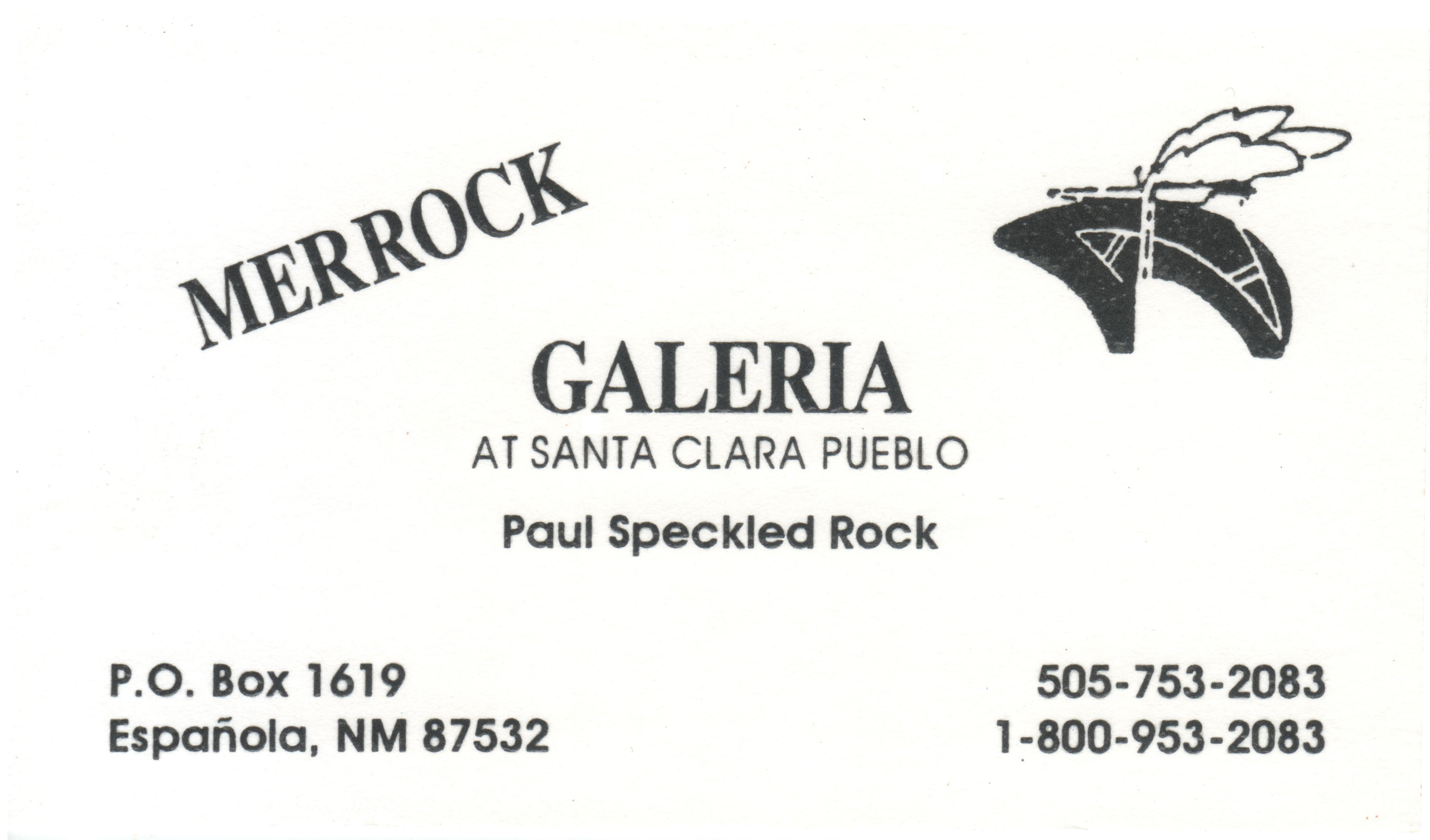
Business card for the Merrock Galeria, owned and managed by Paul Speckled Rock, featuring a representation of a bear fetish for which Paul was famous.

Paul Speckled Rock was the owner of the Merrock Galeria, which was located in the Santa Clara Pueblo. The Galeria was founded in 1984 by Paul and his wife Mercedes. The Galeria featured the work of various pueblo artists, not only from Santa Clara Pueblo but also from other pueblos in the American Southwest. Regarding his ownership of the Galeria, Paul remarked: "I find selling other people's work rewarding. I get to learn more about who my customers are. No two people are alike, and all have different tastes." The Merrock Galeria was frequently a stop on group tours of New Mexico, and Paul enjoyed discussing the artwork and the various creative techniques involved with tour members.
