= Angela Baca =

Native American potter (1927–2014)

Angela T. Baca
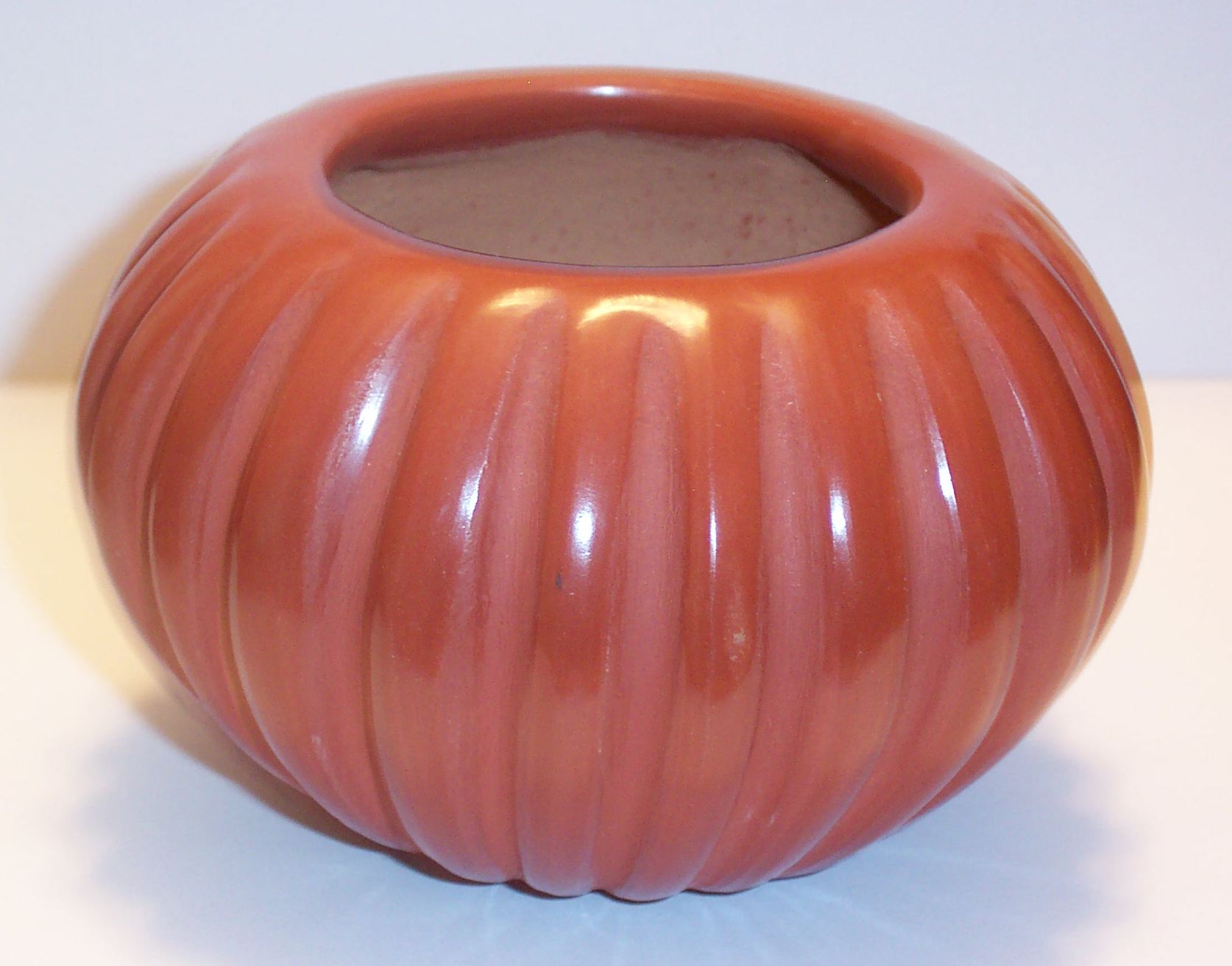
- Red melon bowl made by Angela Baca
- Born: Angela Tafoya; November 6, 1927
- Died: February 16, 2014 (aged 86)
- Known for: Carved redware and blackware; melon bowls; bear paw bowls
- Spouse: Jose Antonio Baca

Angela Tafoya Baca (1927 – 2014) was a Native American artist who was known for her redware and blackware pottery, especially melon bowls and bowls featuring a bear paw design. She had one of the longest careers of the potters in Santa Clara Pueblo in New Mexico. She was a member of the Tewa and a resident of Santa Clara Pueblo.

== Personal life ==
Born on November 6, 1927, Angela Tafoya Baca was the daughter of Severa and Cleto Tafoya. Her childhood home, located in the center of the plaza in Santa Clara Pueblo, later became the Merrock Galeria, which was owned and managed by her nephew Paul Speckled Rock.

Angela married Jose Antonio "Tony" Baca, who served as private first class in the United States Army during World War II. He worked for the Zia Company (later Johnson Controls), which provided support services to Los Alamos National Laboratory at Los Alamos, New Mexico. The couple had 10 children, four of whom (David, Darryl, Leona, and Alvin) became noted Santa Clara Pueblo potters. Angela Baca died on February 16, 2014. She was interred in the Santa Fe National Cemetery.

== Artistic creations ==
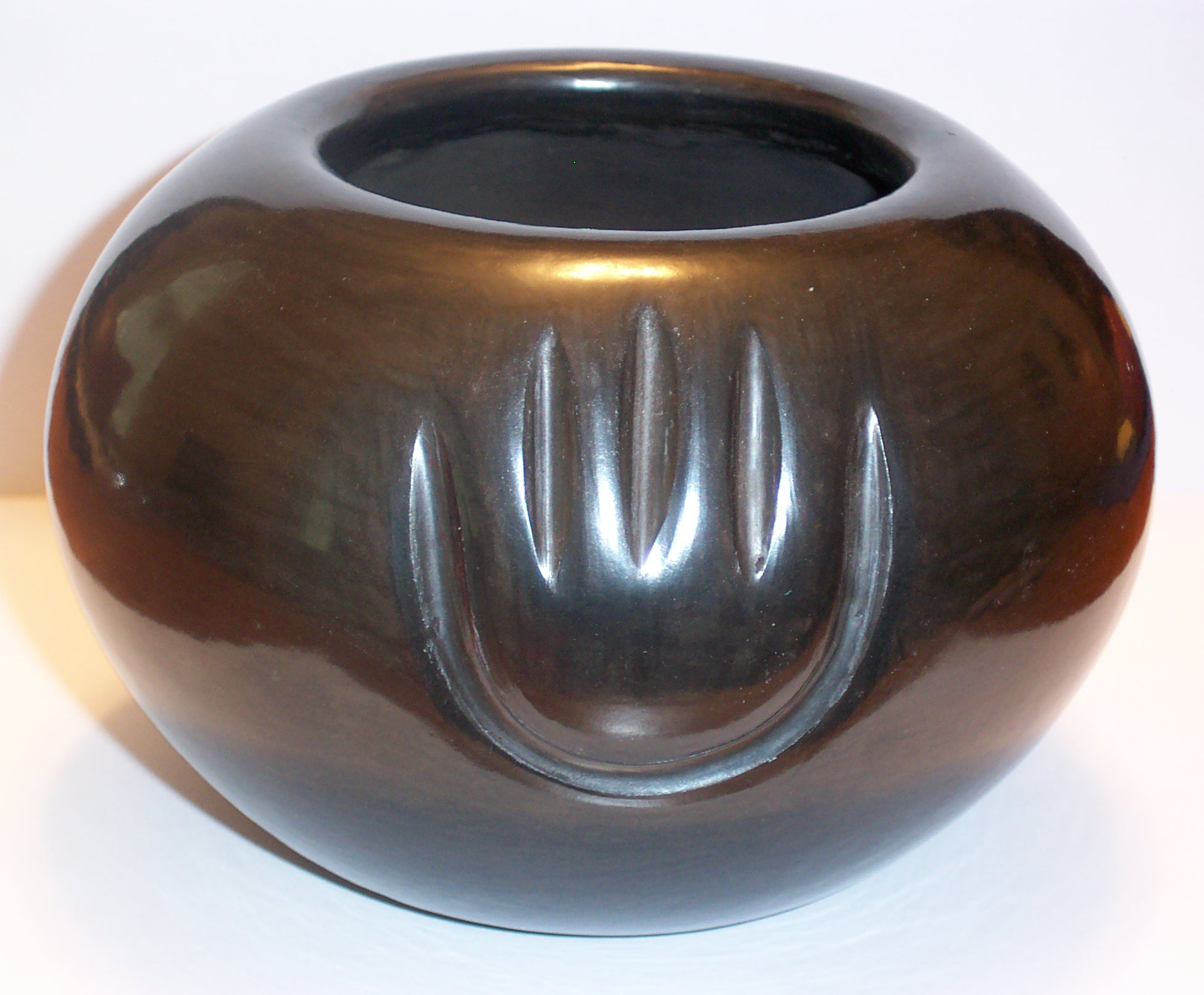
Black stone-polished bowl with bear paw design, crafted by Angela Baca.

Angela Baca learned pottery-making techniques from her mother, Severa Tafoya, a well-known potter of Santa Clara Pueblo. According to Angela, her mother made melon bowls with large ridges, and Angela decided to make them with smaller ridges. Her initial work won first prize at the Santa Fe Indian Market, Santa Fe, New Mexico, and she decided to focus on melon bowls, both red and black, although her work includes other designs, as well. She is considered to be the matriarch of the melon potters. A photograph of Angela Baca at the Santa Fe Indian Market in 1991 is available in the Palace of the Governors Photo Archives Collection.

Four of her children have carried on their mother's tradition of making melon vessels. Sons Darryl and Alvin Baca craft melon bowls and melon jars; son David "Yellow Mountain" Baca is known for his squash design melon bowls and melon seed pots; daughter Leona Baca primarily makes miniature versions of melon bowls.

My family influenced my work. I like it all: gathering the clay, making the pots and polishing.

— Angela Baca, in Neil Chapman, Santa Clara Portraits: A Proud Tradition (1999), page 14

=== Awards ===
Year	Award
1977	Third Place, black jar, Indian Market, Santa Fe, New Mexico
1979	Second Place, melon bowl, Indian Market, Santa Fe, New Mexico
1980	Second, Third Place, Indian Market, Santa Fe, New Mexico
1981	Second Place, Indian Market, Santa Fe, New Mexico
1986	Third Place, wedding vase, Indian Market, Santa Fe, New Mexico
1992	Third Place, black melon bowl, Indian Market, Santa Fe, New Mexico

=== Exhibitions ===
Year	Venue
1977-99	Indian Market, Santa Fe, New Mexico
1979	Old Santa Fe Trading Company, Elgin, Illinois
1984	The Graphic Image, Millburn, New Jersey (gallery show with Maria Martinez and Popovi Da, Blue Corn, Stella Chavarria, and others)
1985	Sid Deusch Gallery, New York, New York (gallery show with Margaret Tafoya)

Additional exhibitions: Heard Museum, Phoenix, Arizona; National Museum of the American Indian, Washington, D.C.; Wheelwright Museum of the American Indian, Santa Fe, New Mexico.
