= Roxanne Swentzell =

Native American sculptor from New Mexuci (born 1962)

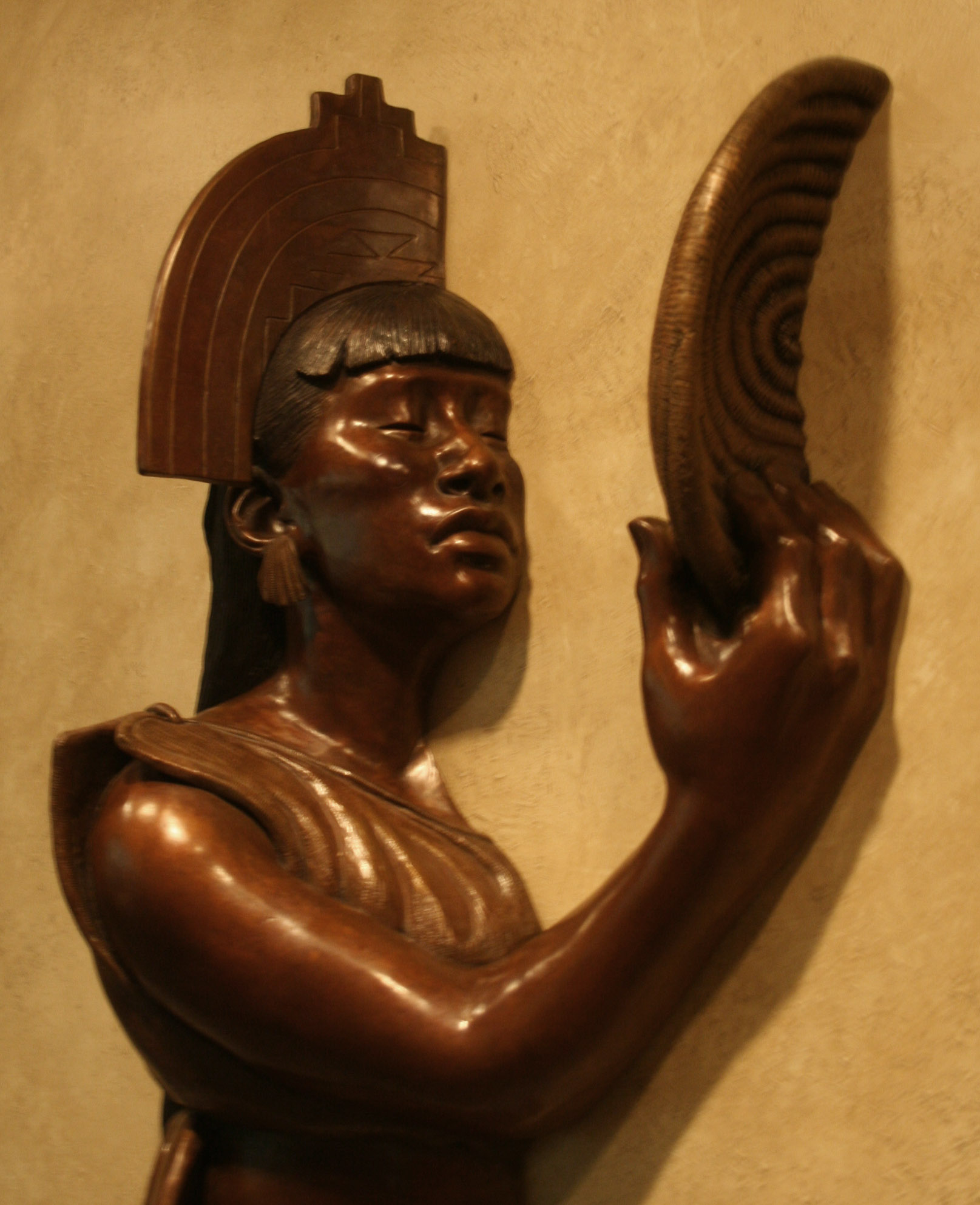
- For Life in all Directions, bronze sculpture by Roxanne Swentzell at National Museum of the American Indian
- Born: December 9, 1962 (age 63); Taos Pueblo, New Mexico, U.S.
- Citizenship: Santa Clara Pueblo and American
- Education: Portland Museum of Art School, Institute of American Indian Arts
- Known for: Ceramics, Sculpture
- Notable work: Mud Woman Rolls On (2011)
- Movement: Pueblo ceramics
- Website: roxanneswentzell.net

Roxanne Swentzell (born December 9, 1962) is a Santa Clara Tewa Native American sculptor, ceramic artist, Indigenous food activist, and gallerist. Her artworks are in major public collections and she has won numerous awards.

Swentzell's work addresses personal and social commentary, reflecting respect for family, cultural heritage, and for the Earth. Her sculptural work has been exhibited at the White House as well as in international museums and galleries. She has been commissioned to create permanent installations at the Smithsonian National Museum of the American Indian, the Museum of Wellington, New Zealand, and other venues, including the University of Pennsylvania Museum of Archaeology and Anthropology in Philadelphia.

== Early life ==
Swentzell was born at Taos Pueblo, New Mexico in 1962. Her parents Ralph and Rina Swentzell (Santa Clara Pueblo) fostered her interest in art. Her father was a German-American philosophy professor who taught at St. John's College, Santa Fe. Her mother, Rina Swentzell, was an activist, architect, scholar and artist born to a Santa Clara Pueblo (Kha'po Owingeh) family of artists. Her uncle, Tito Naranjo, was an artist and scholar, while her other uncle Michael Naranjo, is a well-known sculptor blinded in the Vietnam War. Swentzell's two aunts, Jody Folwell and Nora Naranjo Morse, are ceramic artists.

Swentzel is descended from a long line of Santa Clara Pueblo potters from whom she learned customary methods of pottery making. She grew up watching her mother harvest clay from the earth to create hand-coiled and pit-fired pots. Swentzell began to experiment with clay as a child. She created small figurines that depicted her feelings. Her speech impediment made it difficult for her to communicate, so scraps of clay left over from her mother's pottery projects allowed her to create small figurative sculptures to convey her emotions. Clay sculpture became her primary means to communicate her inner emotional state, and she was supported by understanding teachers.

=== Education ===
In 1978, Swentzell's parents enrolled her at the Institute of American Indian Arts (IAIA) in Santa Fe. Her first art show was in the IAIA Museum. After two years at IAIA, she transferred to the Portland Museum Art School in 1980 because of its emphasis on the human figure. Swentzell grew homesick after one year of study as she became dissatisfied and disillusioned with Portland's art scene. She felt that artists in Portland separated art from their everyday lives, and their art did not thus reflect what surrounded them, whereas her own art was inspired by her life experiences. Swentzell believes in lifelong learning and has said, "Everyday is an amazing new book, a test in every discipline, a chance to advance myself, and great times on the playground."

== Personal life ==
Swentzell homeschooled both her children and her grandchildren. Her son, Dr. Porter Swentzell, is a professor and associate dean at the Institute of American Indian Arts (IAIA). Her daughter Rose Bean Simpson is also a ceramic sculptor, who earned her MFA degree from Rhode Island School of Design; she has exhibited her work widely.

== Career ==
Swentzell's relationship with nature led her to design and plant trees and gardens at her home in the high-desert of Santa Clara Pueblo. Swentzell lives in an adobe house that she built herself. The family partakes in the pueblo's ceremonial dances and feasts at the pueblo. Swentzell also farms her own land to provide self-sustenance.

In 1987, Swentzell co-founded the Santa Clara Pueblo-based nonprofit organization Flowering Tree Permaculture Institute, where she serves as president. Flowering Tree is based on the theories of ecological design, sustainable human living, and agriculture. The institute offers lessons on techniques for living a healthy life. Classes taught at the institute include: methods of farming, low water-use farming in a high desert climate, animal husbandry, adobe construction, and solar energy. Her work at the institute is based on her own personal philosophy informed by Native American ancestors who serve as role models for protectors of Earth who preserve Indigenous knowledge of conservation. Swentzell's initiative, the Pueblo Food Experience, offers participants foods that were available to precontact Tewa people.

Swentzell runs the Tower Gallery located on Pojoaque Pueblo in north Santa Fe. She exhibits her ceramics and bronze work there as well as curated group art exhibitions.

== Artwork ==
Swentzell's sculptures depict emotional portrayals of her own personal experiences. They predominantly take the form of female figures and focus on issues such as gender roles, identity, politics, family, and the past. As in classic Pueblo pottery, Swentzell crafts her clay figures from coils of clay. She differs from other Pueblo potters who dig, sift, clean, and process their own clay by choosing to use commercially produced clay. Swentzell has stated that she is not overly concerned that her clay is store-bought, as clay, no matter where it comes from, comes from the earth. She forms the clay into thick coils to build the walls of the hollow figures. During the two- to four-day process of coiling, Swentzell keeps the clay moist. and uses a knife or stone to smooth over the ridges of the coils. While Swentzell's figures are hollow, the toes and fingers of each figure are solid. The final sculpture is often painted and can include details of eyes, hair or clothing.

=== Emergence of the Clowns ===
Swentzell's Santa Clara heritage can be seen in her Clown series. A clown, or koshare in the Pueblo belief, is a sacred being that often teaches through its actions. Swenztell's Despairing Clown figure is a comment on the loss of one's identity. The sculpture itself is a clown who looks down sadly as he peels off his stripes and seeks to convey the struggle of finding oneself again. Emergence of the Clowns (1988), symbolizes the surfacing of the Pueblo people into this world. Three of the figures in Emergence are partial human forms which progressively lead to a concluding figure who is complete. Each partial form is meant to capture the emotion of amazement, knowledge, and awe. The stages of ascendancy in Emergence, shown in each figure's development, further accentuates the Pueblo's collective journey upward.

=== Pinup ===
Swentzell's work, Pinup, addressed what Swentzell believes to be the unrealistic physical expectations placed by popular culture on young women and the resulting struggle by women with self-image and identity. In Pinup, the Native American woman's unemotional face is painted white. The figure covers her nude form behind a headless poster of a thin, bikini-wearing model (similar to the graphic posters of Playboy pin-ups from the late 1970s by Patrick Nagel). The figure struggles to fit into society's preconceived image for her, hiding behind the mask of an unobtainable picture, both in color and shape. The burden of the "perfect" body and face weighs heavily on the figure so that the figure is reduced to a slouched, defeated posture; the figure's fingers and toes are unadorned by make-up and the poster, showing the figure's genuine beautiful nature.

=== In Crisis ===
Swentzell's In Crisis (1999) seeks to explore the media's influence on women's beauty and identity. The figure in this piece is seemingly conscious of the effect the media and pop culture is having on her. The figure struggles to fight off these projected ideals of beauty and identity by clawing her own hand. Yet, the figure's own brightly painted red fingernails symbolize the danger the media poses to her.

=== For Life in All Directions ===
Swentzell's permanent public art installation, For Life in All Directions (2004) was commissioned by the National Museum of the American Indian (Smithsonian Institution), in Washington DC. It is created from cast bronze, coiled and hand-built pottery and paint. It is installed in the foyer of the Elmer and Mary Louise Rasmuson Theater.

=== Nestled Lives ===
The University of Pennsylvania Museum of Archaeology and Anthropology purchased the sculpture, Nestled Lives, from Swentzell in 2000 for display in the Native American Voices Gallery, curated by Dr. Lucy Fowler Williams. The sculpture is made from clay and depicts a seated woman with outstretched arms holding three nested vessels in her stomach. Made at the time of the Los Alamos fires, Swentzell was thinking about humans, and especially women, as vessels. According to the artist "I could see the land near my home burning... For Pueblo people, earth is our mother—earth itself is seen like a bowl. Nesting bowls are seen as a sign sort of like generations—the earth holds all of us, nestled within."

== Awards and honors ==
In 1984, Swentzell first participated in the annual Santa Fe Indian Market. Two years later she received eight awards for her sculpture and pottery displayed at the market. Swentzell was awarded the Market's Creative Excellence in Sculpture honor. In 2019 she was selected to give the commencement keynote address at the Institute of American Indian Arts.

== Exhibitions ==
- White House, Washington, DC
- Smithsonian National Museum of the American Indian
- Cartier, Paris
- Santa Fe Convention Center, Santa Fe, New Mexico
- Museum of Wellington, New Zealand
- Autry Museum of the American West, Los Angeles, CA

== Collections ==
Her work is included in collections of the Smithsonian's National Museum of the American Indian, Cartier in Paris, the Museum of New Zealand, Te Papa Tongarewa, the Santa Fe Convention Center, and the Museum of Wellington in New Zealand. Other collections include the Brooklyn Museum, the Heard Museum, Denver Art Museum, Joslyn Art Museum, Nelson-Atkins Museum of Art, among others.

== Bibliography ==
- Crozier-Hogle, Lois, Darryl Babe Wilson, and Jay Leibold. Surviving in Two Worlds: Contemporary Native American Voices. Austin: University of Texas, 1997. Print.
- "Exhibitions: An Art of Our Own: Women Ceramicists from the Permanent Collection." Brooklyn Museum: Exhibitions: An Art of Our Own: Women Ceramicists from the Permanent Collection. Retrieved 9 Mar. 2012.
- Fauntleroy, Gussie. Roxanne Swentzell Extra Ordinary People. New Mexico Magazine, 2002. Print.
- "Flowering Tree Permaculture Institute." Flowering Tree Permaculture Institute. Retrieved 14 Mar. 2012.
- Green, Rayna, and Melanie Fernandez. "Roxanne Swentzell." The British Museum Encyclopedia of Native North America. (Bloomington: Indiana University Press, 1999).
- Jackson, Devon. "Swentzell 39." Working Mother Nov. 2002: 44–45.
- "Roxanne Swentzell. Fine Western Art, Artists & Galleries, Southwest Art Magazine. Retrieved 10 Mar. 2012.
- "Roxanne Swentzell." Institute of American Indian Arts. Retrieved 14 Mar. 2012.
- "Roxanne Swentzell." Women Artists of Color: A Bio-critical Source Book to 20th Century Artist in the Americas. Ed. Phoebe Farris. 1999. 95–97. Print.
- "Towa Artists | Free Resource for Native American Artists." Towa Artists. Retrieved 6 Mar. 2012.
- "Visiting the New Mex "Roxanne Swentzell." Western Art and Architecture Magazine. Retrieved 13 Mar. 2012.
- Art of Roxanne Swentzell." Roxanne Swentzell Sculptures and Art. Retrieved 9 Mar. 2012.
