= Kha'p'o Community School =

Tribal school in New Mexico, United States

Coordinates: 35°58′14″N 106°5′14″W

Kha'p'o Community School, formerly known as the Santa Clara Day School, is a tribal elementary school in Santa Clara Pueblo, New Mexico, with an Española postal address. It is affiliated with the Bureau of Indian Education (BIE).

Located in proximity to Espanola, it was formerly directly operated by the BIE. In 1990 it had the highest number of students of the three Native American schools in the northern "pueblos" of New Mexico.

== History ==
In 1987 the North Central Association of Colleges and Schools accredited the school.

In 1991 a bill was filed in the New Mexico Legislature in honor of the school's achievements.

A NACA-Inspired Schools Network-spearheaded change, partly done to ensure students kept fluency in the Tewa language, meant that in 2016 it became operated by a tribe, and it gained its current name.

== Operations ==
After completing education at Kha'p'o, students typically go to Pojoaque Valley School District facilities.
