= Jody Folwell =

Native American potter and artist

External images
- Jody Folwell at Indian Market, 2009
- Sgraffito birds and spirit birds
- Lizards and Wolf
- Rabbit Dancer by Susan Folwell (scroll down)

Jody Folwell-Turipa (born 1942 in Santa Clara Pueblo, New Mexico) is a Puebloan potter and artist.

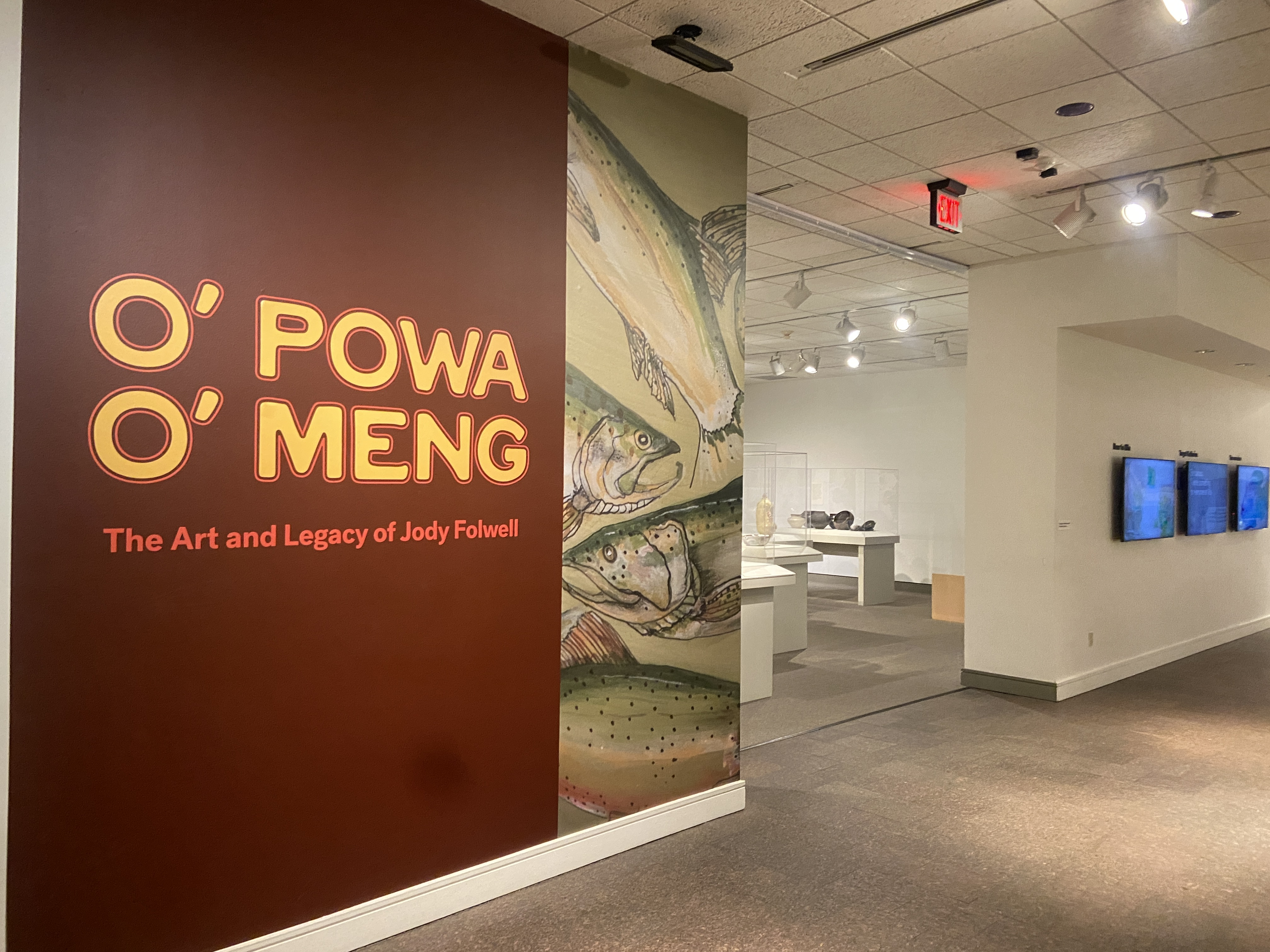
'O' Powa O' Meng: The Art and Legacy of Jodi Folwell, Minneapolis Institute of Arts

One of nine children in the Naranjo family of Santa Clara potters and other artists, Folwell is one of the best-known avant-garde Pueblo potters. Lee Cohen, the late owner of Gallery 10 in Santa Fe and Scottsdale, referred to Folwell as the "first impressionist potter" for her "innovative, off-round, uneven-lipped, asymmetrical polished pots". Folwell is known for her use of social commentary and satire in her pots.

In 1984, she collaborated with Chiricahua Apache sculptor Bob Haozous to create a pot that received the Best of Show award at Santa Fe Indian Market. Fowler's pots are in the permanent collection of the Smithsonian Institution's National Museum of the American Indian.

Folwell has two daughters, Susan Folwell and Polly Rose Folwell, who are both accomplished potters. In 2009 and 2010 the Heard Museum featured works by all three women in their Mothers & Daughters: Stories in Clay exhibition. Folwell's mother, Rose Naranjo, was also a respected Santa Clara potter.

Of her work, Folwell has said, "I think of each piece as an artwork that has something to say on its own, a statement about life. I think of myself as being a contemporary potter and a traditionalist at the same time. Combining the two is very emotional and exciting to me."

== Selected exhibitions ==
- Hearts of Our People: Native Women Artists, (2019), Minneapolis Institute of Art, Minneapolis, Minnesota, United States.
- O' Powa O' Meng: The Art and Legacy of Jodi Folwell, (2024), Minneapolis Institute of Arts (MIA), Minneapolis, Minnesota, United States.

== See also ==
- Jody Naranjo, Jody Folwell's niece
- Rose Naranjo, matriarch of the Naranjo family of potters and ceramicists
