= Nora Naranjo Morse =

Native American artist and poet

- Born: 1953 (age 72–73)
- Citizenship: Pueblo of Santa Clara and U.S.
- Education: BA, College of Santa Fe, Honorary PhD, Skidmore College
- Children: Eliza Naranjo Morse
- Scientific career
- Fields: Native American ceramic sculpture and poet
- Website: noranaranjomorse.squarespace.com

Nora Naranjo Morse (born 1953) is a Native American artist and poet. She currently resides in Española, New Mexico just north of Santa Fe and is a member of the Santa Clara Pueblo, part of the Tewa people. Her work can be found in several museum collections including the Heard Museum in Phoenix, Arizona, the Minneapolis Institute of Art in Minnesota, and the National Museum of the American Indian in Washington, DC, where her hand-built sculpture piece, Always Becoming, was selected from more than 55 entries submitted by Native artists as the winner of an outdoor sculpture competition held in 2005. In 2014, she was honored with a NACF Artist Fellowship for Visual Arts and was selected to prepare temporal public art for the 5x5 Project by curator Lance Fung.

== Early life and education ==
Nora Naranjo Morse was born in 1953 in Santa Clara Pueblo, in Northern New Mexico. She is the daughter of potter Rose Naranjo, and a member of the Santa Clare Pueblo Tribe. Morse has two sisters, Tessie Naranjo PhD who is a consultant on Tewa culture and Dolly Naranjo-Neikrug who is a potter and embroiderer, and a younger brother, Michael Naranjo who is a sculptor. Morse graduated from Taos High School in Taos, New Mexico in 1971 and received a bachelor's degree in university studies from Santa Fe College in 1980. She received an honorary Doctorate from Skidmore College in 2007. She has a daughter, Eliza Naranjo Morse, who graduated from Skidmore College with a B.S. in art.

== Work ==
Morse's earlier sculpting work was made using clay. Inspired by the ancient traditions of making Pueblo Clowns, she created her own character named "Pearlene". She wrote adventures about this character in "Mud Women", a book of her own poetry. In her later work, Morse commented on Indian Stereotypes as well as raising questions within her own community. Some of her most well-known installations include Sugared Up: A Waffle Garden (1999); I've Been Bingo-ed by My Baby!: A story of love lust, and loss on the rez... (2009); and A Pueblo Woman's Clothesline (1995).

== Collections ==
Morse's earthwork project, Numbe Wahgeh, is in the collection of the 1% for Art Program of the city of Albuquerque.

Her work, Our Homes, Ourselves, is in the collection of the Minneapolis Institute of Art.

Other works by Morse are in the collections of the Albuquerque Museum, the Heard Museum, and the National Museum of the American Indian of the Smithsonian Institution.

== Quote ==
"There is no word for art in the Tewa language ... There is though the concept for an artful life, filled with inspiration and fueled by labor and thoughtful approach."

== Exhibits ==
Morse's work was featured in the Hearts of Our People: Native Women Artists, (2019), Minneapolis Institute of Art, Minneapolis, Minnesota, United States. She has also shown at the Heard Museum, the Wheelwright Museum, the White House, and the Canadian Museum of Civilization.

== Honors and awards ==
In 2003, Morse received a Contemporary Art Fellowship for her project Path Breakers from the Eiteljorg Museum of American Indians and Western Art. In 1993, she received a Dubin Fellowship from the School of American Research. In 1982, she was awarded a fellowship from the Southwestern Association on Indian Affairs.
