= Michael Naranjo =

American sculptor

- Born: 1944 (age 81–82); Santa Clara Pueblo, New Mexico
- Known for: sculpture
- Notable work: Santa Clara Rain Dancer (1979)

Michael Naranjo is a Native American blind sculptor. Born in Santa Clara Pueblo in Northern New Mexico in 1944, he is a member of the Tewa Tribe. He was raised in Taos, New Mexico. The son of the ceramic artist Rose Naranjo, he made first contact with pottery and art by the side of his mother. He was drawn into the army and served in Vietnam War. During the patrol the Viet Cong soldier threw the grenade that took his sight and maimed his right hand. During the convalescence period he started sculpting in clay. Gradually sculpting became his passion and profession. The first models were made in clay, wax and papier-mache, some were cast in bronze. Later, he used stone in his art. His favorite topics are Native American warrior, a hoop dancer, a female nude, a child, a soldier, a bear or fish or bird. (Note: Naranjo encourages visitors touring his exhibitions to run their hands along his sculptures. When they close their eyes and feel the bronze beneath their fingertips, he hopes people will realize that "sight" isn't limited to the eyes.)

== Work ==
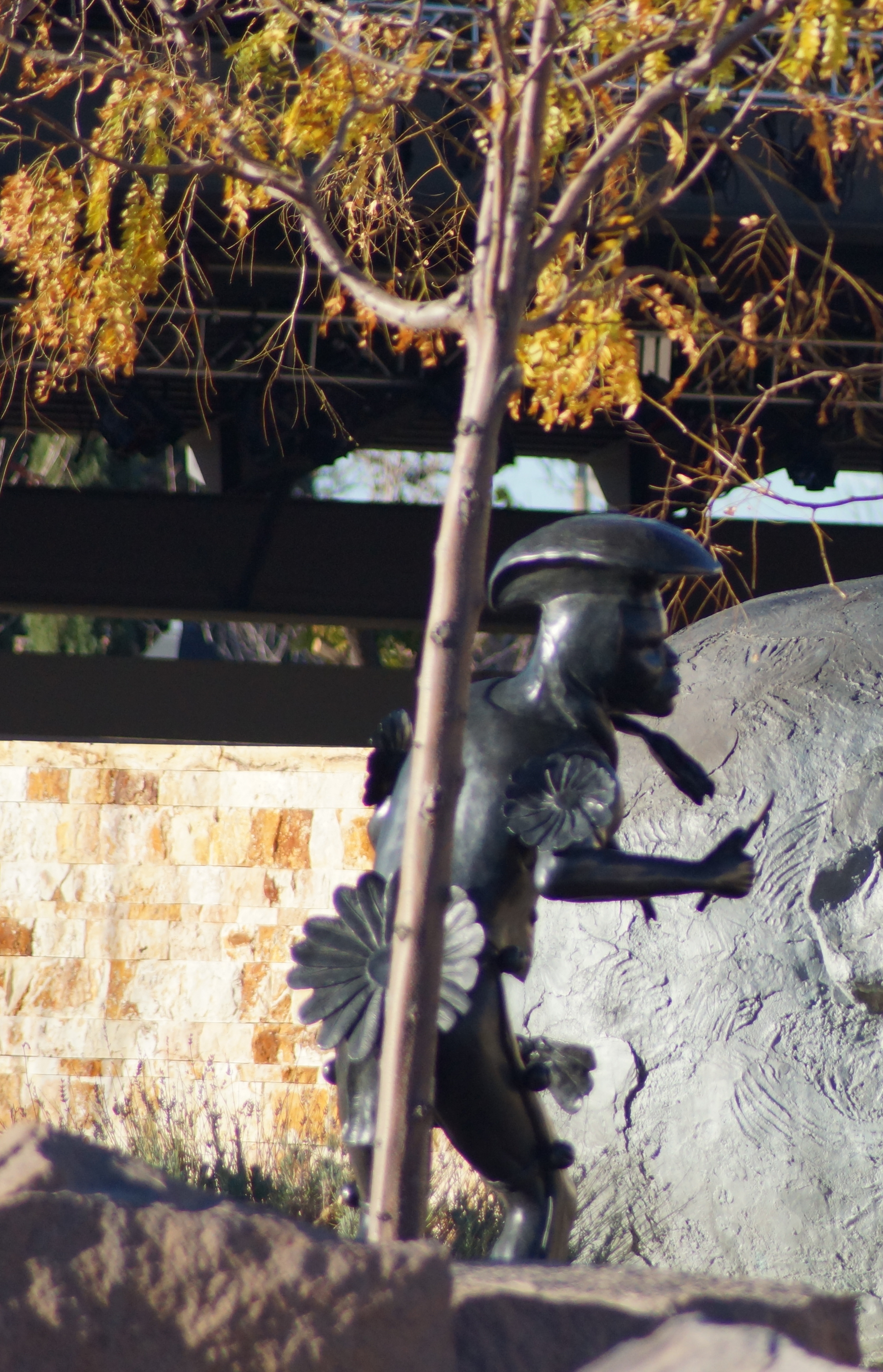
2013, The Dancer, Michael Naranjo, Albuquerque Museum Sculpture Garden

Naranjo's work has become widely recognized. The Italian government allowed Naranjo to mount a specially-built scaffold and to come into actual physical contact with Michelangelo's David in Florence in 1986. This is shown in two PBS videos. He was permitted to "visit by touch" sculptures in Louvre. In 2019 he visited the National Cowboy & Western Heritage Museum to "visit by touch" James Earle Fraser's sculpture, End of the Trail.

His words inscribed on one of the 18 glass panels of the American Veterans Disabled for Life Memorial in Washington, D.C., were cited by President Obama at the dedication ceremony:

"When you're young, you're invincible. You're immortal. I thought I'd come back. Perhaps I wouldn't, there was that thought, too, but I had this feeling that I would come back. Underneath that feeling, there was another, that maybe I wouldn't be quite the same, but I felt I'd make it back."
—Michael A. Naranjo

== Awards ==
In 1979 his Santa Clara Rain Dancer sculpture was awarded First Prize, Best in Class and Best in Division at the Santa Fe Indian Market.

He was honored in 1990 with the Distinguished Achievement Award from the National Press Club in Washington, D.C.

In 1999 he was honored as the LIFE Foundation's Presidential Unsung Hero.

In 2004, he was the recipient of the Santa Fe Rotary Foundation's Distinguished Art Award.

== Collections ==
Naranjo's pieces are included in the permanent collections of The Vatican, Vatican City, Italy; The White House, Washington D.C. and The Heard Museum, Phoenix, Arizona.
