= Santa Clara Pueblo, New Mexico =

Santa Clara Pueblo, New Mexico Khaˀpʼoe Ówîngeh (Tewa)
- CDP
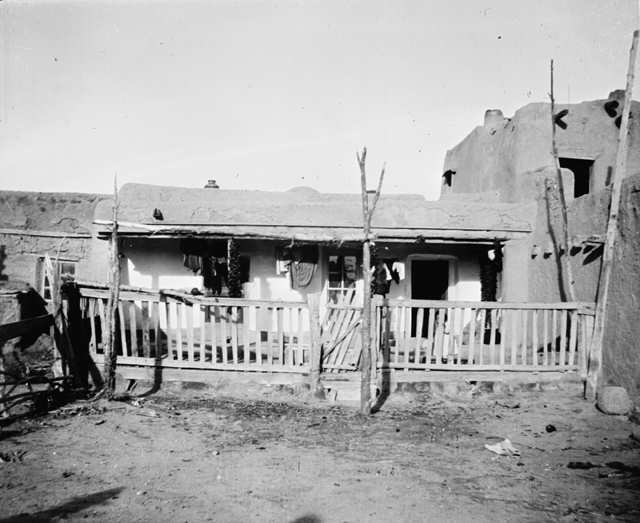
- House at Santa Clara Pueblo, 1910

- Location of Santa Clara Pueblo
- Coordinates: 35°58′21″N 106°05′34″W
- Country: United States
- State: New Mexico
- County: Rio Arriba

Area
  - Total: 2.04 sq mi (5.28 km^{2})
  - Land: 2.02 sq mi (5.23 km^{2})
  - Water: 0.019 sq mi (0.05 km^{2})
- Elevation: 5,670 ft (1,730 m)

Population (2020)
  - Total: 930
  - Density: 460.5/sq mi (177.79/km^{2})
- Time zone: UTC-7 (Mountain (MST))
  - Summer (DST): UTC-6 (MDT)
- ZIP code: 87532
- Area code: 505
- FIPS code: 35-70390
- GNIS feature ID: 2409276
- Santa Clara Pueblo
- U.S. National Register of Historic Places
- U.S. Historic district
- NM State Register of Cultural Properties
- Location within New Mexico
- Nearest city: Española, New Mexico
- Area: 24 acres (9.7 ha)
- NRHP reference No.: 74001199
- NMSRCP No.: 231

Significant dates
- Added to NRHP: November 5, 1974
- Designated NMSRCP: December 30, 1971

Santa Clara Pueblo (Tewa: Khaˀpʼoe Ówîngeh, pronounced [xɑ̀ʔpʼòː ʔówîŋɡè], lit. 'singing water village' or 'rose water village'), also known as the Village of Wild Roses, is a census-designated place (CDP) in Rio Arriba County, New Mexico, United States and a federally recognized tribe of Native American Tewa Pueblo people. As of the 2020 census, Santa Clara Pueblo had a population of 930.

The pueblo is a member of the Eight Northern Pueblos, and the people are from the Tewa ethnic group of Native Americans who speak the Rio Grande Tewa language. The pueblo is on the Rio Grande, between Ohkay Owingeh (formerly San Juan Pueblo) to the north and San Ildefonso Pueblo (Pʼohwhogeh Ówîngeh) to the south.

Santa Clara Pueblo is famous for producing hand-crafted pottery, specifically blackware and redware with deep engravings. The pueblo is listed on the National Register of Historic Places.

== Geography ==
Santa Clara Pueblo is located approximately 1.5 miles south of Española on NM 30.

According to the United States Census Bureau, the CDP has a total area of 2.1 square miles (5.4 km^{2}), all land.

== Demographics ==
Historical population
Census	Pop.	Note	%±
2020	930		—
U.S. Decennial Census

The 2010 census found that 1,018 people lived in the CDP, while 1,182 people in the United States reported being exclusively Santa Claran and 1,425 people reported being Santa Claran exclusively or in combination with another group.

== Government ==
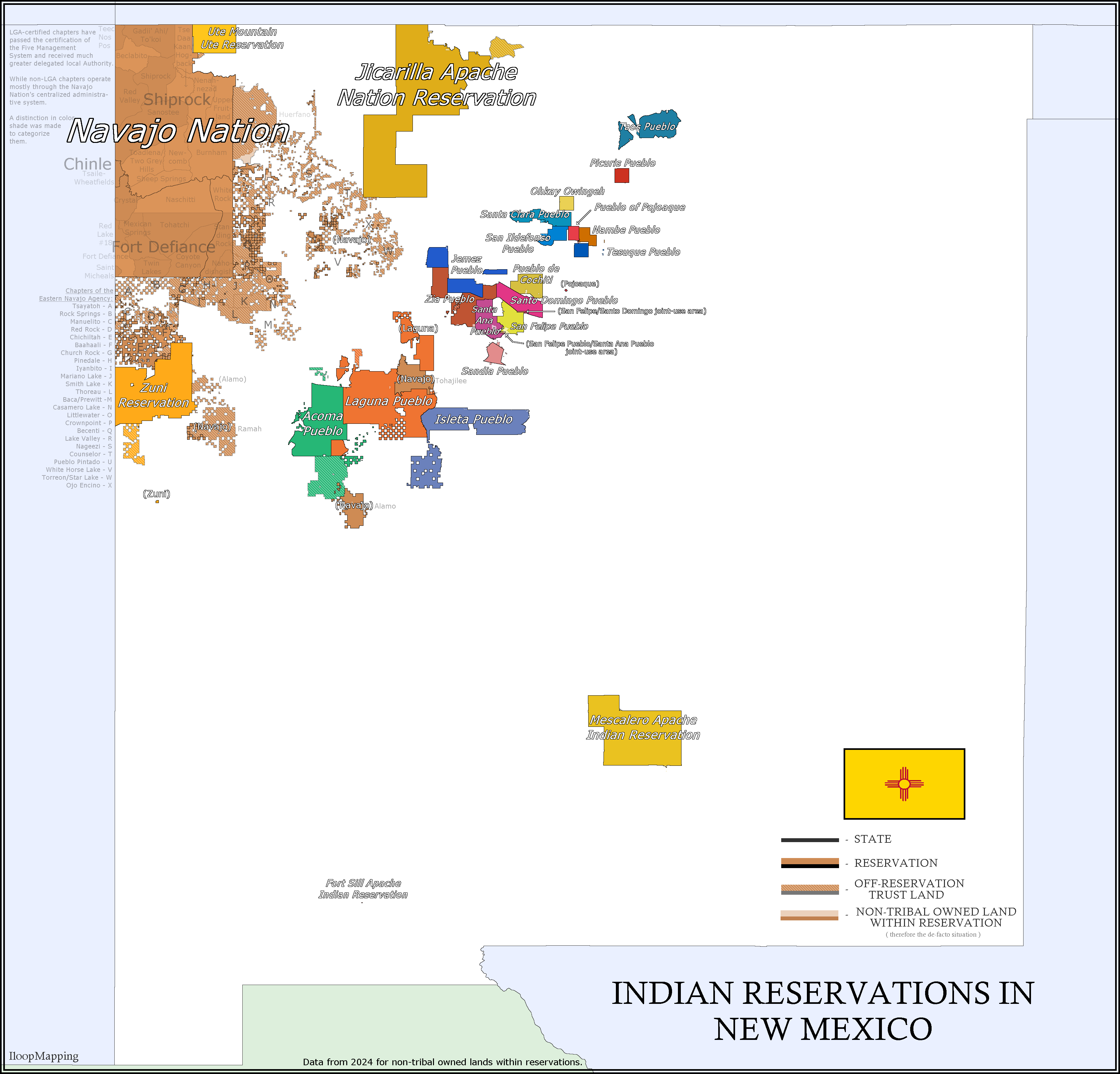
Map of the Santa Clara and neighbouring tribes (In blue).

The administration of the Pueblo of Santa Clara in 2025 is:

- Governor: James Naranjo
- Lieutenant Governor: Charles Suazo

== History ==
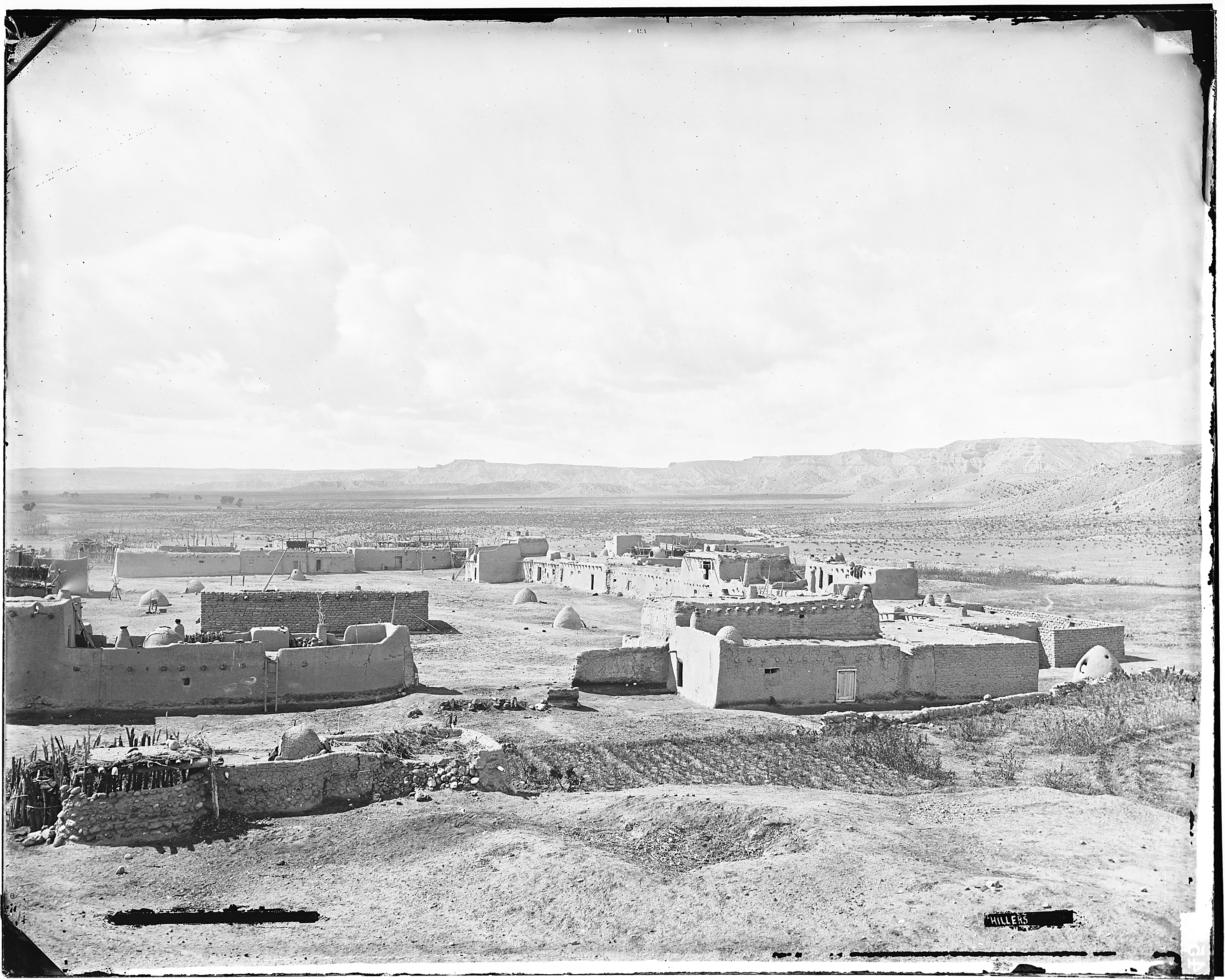

Tewa people lived in the Pueblo area for millennia before they met Spanish conquistador Juan de Oñate and his exploration party on July 11, 1598. Pueblo archaeology shows that Ancestral Puebloans lived in the general region as far back as 1200 BC.

Archaeological evidence, oral history, and Santa Clara's distinct dialect of Tewa have been taken as evidence that Tano Tewa from the Galisteo Basin may have been contributed to the Pueblo's population in the early 1500s.

First visited by Europeans in 1541, a segment of Francisco Coronado's expeditionary force met with the residents of the nearby Caypa Pueblo. After annexation of the region into the Spanish Kingdom, and as part of the 1601 expansion of Oñate's colonial capital, a chapel was built there by 1617. Fray Alonso de Benavides established a mission in 1628. The mission was abandoned on the lead up to the Great Pueblo Revolt of 1680.

This Pueblo joined forces with others nearby and fought against the Spanish Royal Government in 1680 in the revolt. The original and unoccupied chapel was destroyed. Two other chapel buildings would be constructed there. The current church replaced the former in 1918.

In 1782, a smallpox outbreak decimated the population. The eighth section of the Act of July 22, 1854, mandated a census of the newly acquired possessions of the US government. In review of the land's title, the pueblo presented a Spanish Royal decree dated October 15, 1713, that the title to land and various pueblos could be expected. Though lost, the decree on the title papers assured protection of the pueblos' right to protection of their homelands from encroachment. The result of the title research led this Pueblo community to be of the first recognized by United States Congress.

== Education ==
It is in the Española Public Schools district. The comprehensive public high school is Española Valley High School.

There is a Bureau of Indian Education (BIE)-affiliated tribal elementary school, Kha'p'o Community School, in Santa Clara Pueblo.

== Arts ==
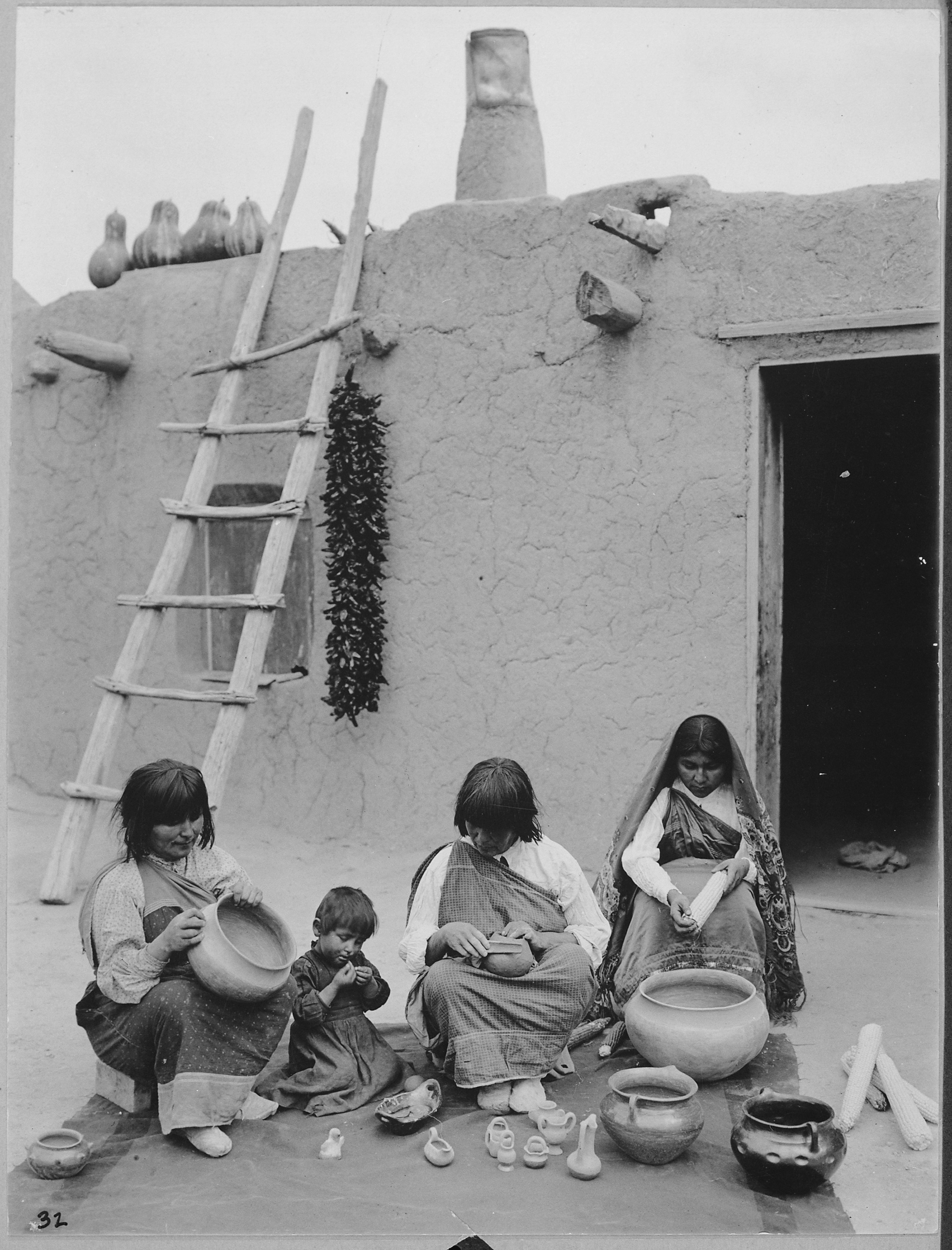
Pottery making at Santa Clara Pueblo, 1916

Among the arts practiced at Santa Clara Pueblo, pottery is one of the most well-known. Traditionally, pottery was made primarily by girls and women, and while many potters today are women, there are many men who make pottery as well. Santa Clara Pueblo potters are known for their black polished and red polished pottery in a distinctive style, especially the use of incised work. "Knife-wing" or eagle feather designs are common on Santa Clara pottery There are a number of well-known ceramic artists from Santa Clara. Four approaches are used in the decoration of the majority of Santa Clara Pueblo ceramics: painted designs, impressed patterns, incised designs, and resist-firing with incised or sgraffito designs.

== Notable tribal members and residents ==
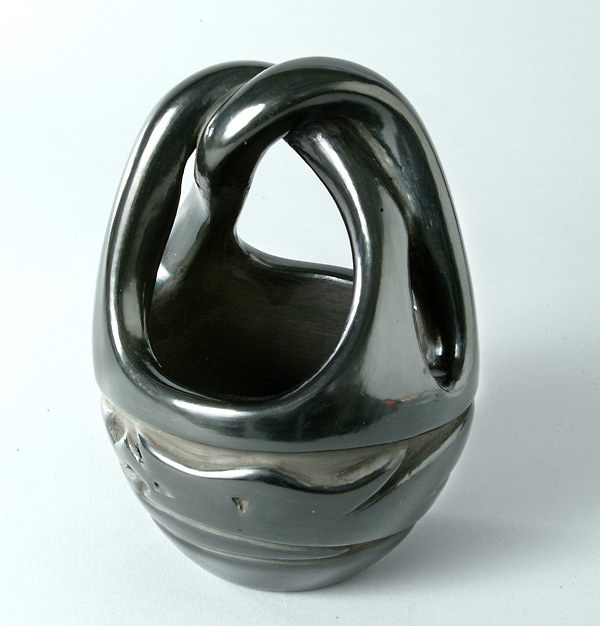
Double-handled Santa Clara bowl with Awanyu design, by Florence Browning, 1996

- Angela Baca, matriarch of the Santa Clara melon potters
- Gregory Cajete, author and educator
- Jody Folwell, potter
- Tammy Garcia, ceramic artist and sculptor
- Luther Gutierrez, potter
- Margaret Gutierrez, potter
- Joseph Lonewolf, potter
- Jody Naranjo, artist
- Michael Naranjo, artist and sculptor
- Nora Naranjo Morse, artist and filmmaker
- Rose Naranjo, potter and matriarch
- Linda and Merton Sisneros, potters
- Paul Speckled Rock, potter and bronze sculptor, gallery owner
- Anita Louise Suazo, traditional potter
- Rina Swentzell, architect, artist and activist
- Roxanne Swentzell, ceramic and bronze sculptor, Native plant activist
- Rose B. Simpson, mixed-media, ceramic, and performance artist
- Margaret Tafoya, Santa Clara traditional potter
- Pablita Velarde, Santa Clara painter
- Nathan Youngblood, potter

== See also ==
- Puye Cliff Dwellings - a park featuring the ancestral villages & cliff dwellings, a National Historic Landmark managed by Santa Clara Pueblo.
- Santa Clara Indian Reservation
- National Register of Historic Places listings in Rio Arriba County, New Mexico
