= Timeline of Native American art history =

Timeline of key events in Native American art history

This is a chronological list of significant or pivotal moments in the development of Native American art or the visual arts of the Indigenous peoples of the Americas. Earlier dates, especially before the 18th century, are mostly approximate.

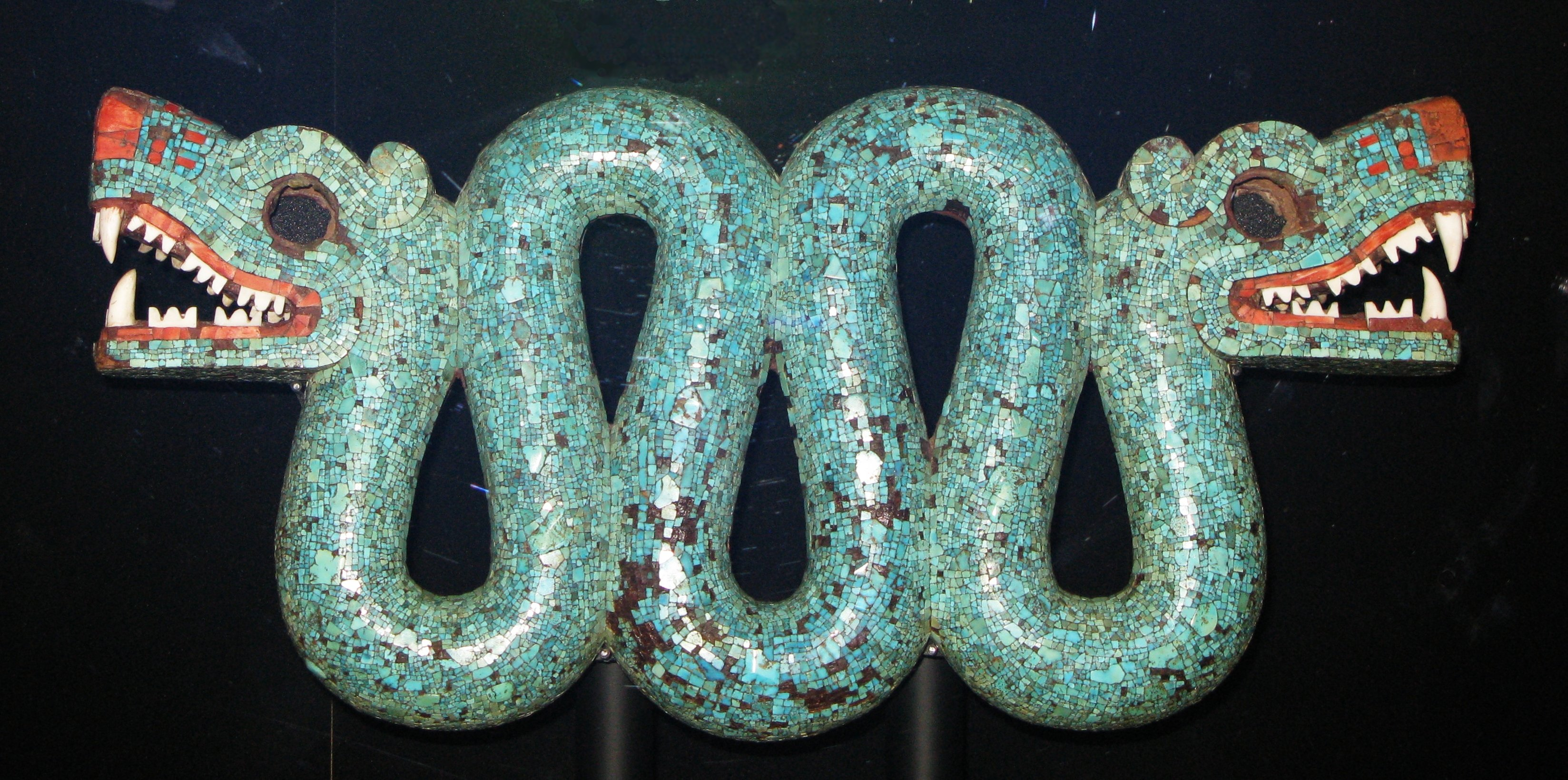
Aztec/Mixtec turquoise mosaic, double-headed serpent pectoral, 15th–16th century CE

== Before common era ==
- 33,950–15,050 BCE: Artists paints hundreds of images at Serra da Capivara, Piauí, in northeastern Brazil.
- 12,800–8,500 BCE: Artists etch the Winnemucca Lake petroglyphs, near Reno, Nevada.
- 11,000 BCE: Megafauna bone etched with a profile image of a walking mammoth and cross-hatched designs left near Vero Beach, Florida is the oldest known portable art in the Americas
- 10,000–7000 BCE: "Horny Little Man," a petroglyph depicting a stick figure with an oversized phallus, is carved in Lapa do Santo, a cave in central-eastern Brazil, is the oldest reliably dated rock art in the Americas.
- 9250–8950 BCE: Clovis points - thin, fluted projectile points created using bifacial percussion flaking - are created by Clovis culture peoples in the Plains and Southwestern North America
- 9250–8550 BCE: Monte Alegre culture rock paintings created at Caverna da Pedra Pintada become the oldest known paintings in South America.
- 9000 BCE: A man and child interred in a cave near Serranópolis in central Brazil are accompanied by necklaces of human teeth and mother of pearl
- 8500 BCE minimum age (could date back to 12,800 BCE): The Winnemucca Lake petroglyphs located near Winnemucca Lake, a dry lakebed in northwestern Nevada, are the earliest known petroglyphs in North America. They feature repeating designs of dots and arches, and other abstract designs.
- 8000 BCE: Fiberwork left in Guitarrero Cave, Peru is the earliest known example of textiles in South America
- 8200 BCE: Cooper Bison skull is painted with a red zigzag in present day Oklahoma, becoming the oldest known painted object in North America.
- 7650 BCE: Cave painting in the Toquepala Caves, Peru
- 7370±90: Stenciled hands are painted with mineral inks at the Cueva de las Manos, near Perito Moreno, Argentina, as well as images of humans, guanacos, rheas, felines, other animals, geometric shapes, the sun, and hunting scenes
- 7300 BCE: A painted herringbone design from Tecolate Cave in the Mojave Desert of California is the earliest well-dated pictograph in North America.
- 5630 BCE: Ceramics left at Caverna da Pedra Pintada, Brazil are the earliest known ceramics in the Americas
- 3450 BCE: Watson Brake, built by a hunter-gatherer society in Louisiana, is the earliest known mound complex in North America
- 2885 BCE: Valdivia culture pottery is created in coastal Ecuador
- 2600–2000 BCE: Monumental architecture, including platform mounds and sunken courtyards, built in Caral, Supe Valley; Asia; Aspero; Salinas de Chao; El Paraíso; La Galgada; and Kotosh, Peru
- 2500–1800 BCE: Elaborate twined textiles are created at Huaca Prieta in northern coastal Peru, part of the Norte Chico civilization
- 2000–1000 BCE: Poverty Point culture in northeastern Louisiana features stone work, flintknapping, earthenware, and effigy, conical, and platform mounds, as well as pre-planned settlements on concentric earthen ridges
- 1500 BCE–250 CE: Maya art is created in their Preclassic Period, in central and southeastern Mexico, Honduras, Guatemala, and El Salvador
- 1400–400 BCE: Olmec culture thrives in Norte Chico, the tropical lowlands of Mexico. Their art includes colossal basalt heads, jade sculpture, carved writing in stones, and ceramic effigy jars.
- 1000–900 BCE: The Cascajal Block is carved with writing by the Olmec people, becoming the earliest known example of writing in the Americas
- 1000–200 BCE: Adena culture, known for its mound building, originates in Ohio and expands to Indiana, West Virginia, Kentucky, and parts of Pennsylvania and New York.
- 900 BCE: Construction begins on Chavín de Huantar, a Chavín city in Callejón de Conchucos, Peru
- 900–200 BCE: Chavín synthesis flourishes in central coastal Peru and is characterized by monumental architecture, goldsmithing, stirrup spout ceramics, and Karwa textiles
- 750–100 BCE: Paracas culture flourishes in south coastal Peru
- 730 BCE: Porcupine quills used as binding agent in Utah and Nevada
- 500 BCE: Zapotec civilization emerges in the Valley of Oaxaca, Mexico. They are known for their ceramics, jewelry, and stonework.
- 200 BCE–500 CE: The Hopewell tradition flourishes in Ohio, Ontario, and surrounding area, featuring ceramics, cut mica, weaving, carved pipes, and jewelry.

== Common era ==
- 1–600: Moche culture flourishes in northern coastal Peru, characterized by monumental adobe mounds, murals, metalwork, and ceramics
- 1–700: Nasca culture thrives in southern coastal Peru, characterized by double spout and bridge vessels and the Nasca lines, monumental geoglyphs
- 200–700: Maya civilization's Classic Period. Architecture, painting, stone glyphic writing, books, painting, ceramics, and Maya textiles created in central and southeastern Mexico, Honduras, Guatemala, and El Salvador
- 400–900: Tiwanaku culture emerges from Lake Titicaca and spreads to southern Peru, eastern Bolivia, and northern Chile
- 500–900: Wari culture dominates central coastal Peru
- 755±65–890±65: likely dates of the Blythe Geoglyphs being sculpted by ancestral Quechan and Mojave peoples in the Colorado Desert, California
- 800–1500: Mississippian cultures flourish in the Eastern Woodlands, featuring ceramics, shell engraving, textiles, woodcarving and stonework.
- 900: Earliest event recorded in the Battiste Good (1821–22, Sicangu Lakota) Winter count
- 900-1470: Chimú culture thrives in Chimor, today's north coastal Peru. Their art is characterized by monochromatic pottery; fine metal working of copper, gold, silver, bronze, and tumbago (copper and gold alloy); and monumental abode construction in their capital city Chan Chan
- 1000: Island of Marajó flourishes as an Amazonian ceramic center
- 1000–1200: Dresden Codex written and illuminated. This Yucatecan Mayan codex from Chichén Itzá is the earliest known surviving book from the Americas
- 1000–1200: Acoma Pueblo and Old Oraibi are established, become the oldest continuously inhabited communities in the United States
- 1070: Great Serpent Mound built in Ohio.
- 1100: Pueblo Bonito in Chaco Canyon reaches apex in size at 800 rooms
- 1100: Hohokam Culture reaches apex in present day Arizona
- 1142: Wampum invented by Ayenwatha, which the Haudenosaunee used to record information.
- 1200–1533: Inca civilization originated in the Peruvian highlands and spreads across western South America
- 1250: Cliff Palace, Mesa Verde, and other Ancestral Pueblo architectural complexes reach their apex
- 1325–1521: The Aztec Empire thrives, based in Tenochtitlan, central Mexico. Their arts are characterized by monumental stone architecture, turquoise mosaics, stone carving, ceramics, cotton textiles, and Aztec codices
- 1430: Construction of Machu Picchu begins, a classic example of Incan architecture
- 1479: Aztec Sun Stone, a monolithic calendar stone, almost 12 feet in diameter, is carved
- 1492: Glass beads are introduced to Taíno people
- 1500: Calusa culture flourishes in Key Marco, Florida, characterized by woodcarving
- 1500–1800: Navajo people learn loom-weaving techniques from Pueblo people
- 1600–1615: Felipe Guaman Poma de Ayala (Quechua) illustrates his 1,189-page book, El primer nueva corónica [sic] y buen gobierno.
- 1600–1650: Fernando de Alva Cortés Ixtlilxochitl (Texcocan, 1568/1580–1648) illustrates the Codex Ixtlilxochitl with watercolor paintings
- 1688: European and Mestizo members of the Cuzco School part ways with the Indian painters, allowing them to develop their own styles.
- 1725: Quebec Grey nuns and Mi'kmaq women devise new floral appliqué techniques in moose hair embroidery

=== 19th century ===
- 1820s: Haida argillite carving emerges, in the wake of the declining Fur trade
- 1820s: Tuscarora brothers David and Dennis Cusick, both self-taught artists, begin painting, founding the Iroquois Realist Movement
- 1825: Ursuline nuns teach floral embroidery to Métis and Dene women in Fort Chipewyan and Winnipeg, which will revolutionize Great Lakes quillwork, embroidery, and beadwork
- 1830–1900: Tribes near Niagara Falls create beadwork whimsies, birch bark boxes, and other art forms, jumpstarting an active souvenir trade, following the decline in the fur trade
- 1840s: Zacharie Vincent (Wendat, 1815–1886) begins his career as a realist oil painter
- 1826/8: David Cusick (ca. 1780–ca. 1831) published his self-illustrated Sketches of Ancient History of the Six Nations.
- 1853: Atsidi Sani (ca. 1830–1918) becomes the first known Navajo silversmith
- 1858–1869: Aron of Kangeq (1822–1869), a Kalaaleq sculptor and carver, paints over 300 watercolors about traditional ways of life in Greenland, later to be published in books
- 1860s: Depletion of buffalo and forced relocation onto reservations causes Plains Indians to shift from hide painting to painting and drawing on cloth and paper, giving birth to Ledger art
- 1876: Mississauga Ojibwe sculptor Edmonia Lewis is the talk of the Centennial Exposition in Philadelphia for her monumental marble sculpture, The Death of Cleopatra.
- 1870–1900: Navajo weavers incorporate new Eyedazzler patterns and Germantown yarns.
- 1875–1878: Southern Plains artists imprisoned at Fort Marion become prolific Ledger artists
- 1885–1890: Nampeyo and her husband Lesou (Hopi) revive Sikyátki style pottery
- 1885–1905: Alaska native arts thrive in the curio trade precipitated by the Klondike Gold Rush
- 1890s: Silver Horn (Kiowa, 1860/1-1940) creates paintings for anthropologist James Mooney
- 1895: John Leslie (Puyallup) published a book of his photography at Carlisle Indian School and exhibits his photographs at the Atlanta International Exposition
- 1899: Tsimshian photographer Benjamin Haldane establishes a professional photography studio in Metlakatla, Alaska

=== 20th century ===
- 1904: Louisiana Purchase Exposition in St. Louis, Missouri features Native American art, including paintings by Silver Horn (Kiowa) and Narcissa Chisholm Owen (Cherokee), art by Geronimo (Chiricahua Apache), and many others
- 1906–1915: Ho-Chunk artist Angel De Cora serves as director of Carlisle Indian School's Native American art program
- 1906: Carlisle Indian School builds state-of-the-art photography school and offers photography classes to its Native students
- 1910s: Maria Martinez (1881–1980, San Ildefonso Pueblo) revives her tribe's blackware ceramics
- 1910–1932: San Ildefonso Pueblo Painting Movement thrives in New Mexico, led by artists Crescencio Martinez, Julian Martinez, Alfredo Montoya, Tonita Peña, Alfonso Roybal, and Abel Sanchez (Oqwa Pi)
- 1914: Louisa Keyser, Washoe basket maker, experiences peak of her fame
- 1915: Iñupiaq men invent baleen basketry
- 1916: In a controversial move, Navajo weaver Hastiin Klah (1867–1937) incorporates Yeibichei imagery into a rug
- 1917: Quechua photographer Martín Chambi establishes his own photography studio in Peru
- 1917–1930s: Seminole women in Florida develop their unique patchwork appliqué designs
- 1918: Julian Martinez (San Ildefonso Pueblo) invents the matte-on-glossy blackware ceramic technique
- 1920s: The Kwakwaka'wakw Four (Chief George, Charley George, Sr., Willie Seaweed, and George Walkus) collaborate to revive and modernize Kwakwaka'wakw art
- 1922: Social Indigenist movement begins in Peru and thrives for three decades
- 1922: First Santa Fe Indian Market held, sponsored by the Museum of New Mexico
- 1925: Native Arts department of the Denver Art Museum was founded
- 1926: Indigenist Movement formed in Ecuador by Camilo Egas, Oswaldo Guayasamín, and other Quechua and Mestizo artists
- 1927: First Nations art exhibited with Euro-Canadian art in the Exhibition of the Canadian West Coast Art in the National Gallery of Canada in Ottawa
- 1928: Kiowa Six participate in the International Art Congress in Prague, Czech Republic
- 1931: Exposition of Indian Tribal Arts opens at the Grand Central Art Galleries in New York City. Sponsored by the Commissioner of Indian Affairs, the Secretary of the Interior, and the College Art Association, the exhibition of over 600 artworks then toured the Venice Biennale.
- 1932: Kiowa Six participate in the Venice Biennale. Their art, according to Dorothy Dunn, "was acclaimed the most popular exhibit among all the rich and varied displays assembled."
- 1932: Professor Mary Stone McClendon "Ataloa" (Chickasaw, 1895–1967) founds the Ataloa Art Lodge, a Native American art center at Bacone College, in Muskogee, Oklahoma
- 1932: The Studio at the Santa Fe Indian School is established by Dorothy Dunn
- 1933–34: Century of Progress Exposition, better known as the Chicago World's Fair features Native artists such as Navajo artists Fred Peshlaikai, Ah-Kena-Bah, and Hastiin Klah, as well as Maria and Julian Martinez, who won Best in Show.
- 1934: Arts and Crafts of the Indians of the Southwest opens at the DeYoung Museum in San Francisco
- 1934–1941: The Seneca Indian Arts Project, a WPA-funded project at the Rochester Museum and Science Center, headed by Arthur C. Parker (Seneca), hires 70 Haudenosaunee artists to create almost 6,000 artworks
- 1936: Indian Arts and Crafts Board created in the US
- 1938: Osage Nation establishes the oldest tribal museum in Pawhuska, Oklahoma
- 1939: Many Native artists participate in the 1939 New York World's Fair including realist landscape painter Moses Stranger Horse (Brulé Lakota, 1890–1941) and Fort Sill Apache sculptor Allan Houser (1914–1994)
- 1939: Hopi artist Fred Kabotie curates a Native American art show at the Golden Gate International Exposition in San Francisco
- 1941: Indian Art of the United States exhibition shows at the Museum of Modern Art, New York City
- 1946: Qualla Arts and Crafts is founded on the Qualla Boundary in North Carolina by Eastern Band Cherokee artists, becoming the first arts and crafts cooperative founded by Native Americans in the US
- 1948: Allan Houser completes his first monumental sculpture at the Haskell Indian School in Lawrence, Kansas
- 1950s and 1960s: Maya weaving cooperatives established by the Mexican government
- 1957: West Baffin Eskimo Co-op Ltd., an Inuit graphic arts workshop, is founded by James Archibald Houston in Cape Dorset, Nunavut.
- 1958: Yanktonai Dakota artist Oscar Howe (1915–1983) writes his famous letter after his work was rejected from the Philbrook Museum art show for not being "Indian" enough
- 1958: Heard Museum Guild hosts their first annual Indian Fair and Market in Phoenix, Arizona
- 1958–1962: Norval Morrisseau (Ojibwe) develops Woodlands Style painting in Ontario
- 1960: Oscar Howe appears on an episode of This Is Your Life, Ralph Edwards Productions, NBC, 13 April 1960. The guest host was Vincent Price. Among the surprise guests was Howe's former teacher, Dorothy Dunn.
- 1962: The Institute of American Indian Arts is founded in Santa Fe, New Mexico
- 1965: University of Alaska, Fairbanks creates their Native Art Center
- 1967: Fritz Scholder paints Indian No. 1, 1967, Oil paint on canvas, 20 x 18 in, the first of his famed Indian series paintings.
- 1967: Red Cloud Indian School in Pine Ridge, South Dakota hosts its first annual juried, competitive, intertribal art show which continues today
- 1971: The Cherokee Heritage Center in Park Hill, Oklahoma hosts the first Trail of Tears art show, an annual juried, competitive, intertribal art show which also continues today
- 1971: The Institute of American Indian Arts Museum (now called the Museum of Contemporary Native Arts) is founded by the Institute of American Indian Arts in Santa Fe, as the only museum to focus on contemporary intertribal Native American art
- 1972: Two American Painters shows at the Smithsonian Institution's National Collection of Fine Arts in Washington, DC, featuring T. C. Cannon (Kiowa/Caddo) and Fritz Scholder (Luiseño)
- 1977: Sna Jolobil (House of the Weaver) in San Cristobal de Las Casas, Mexico becomes the first artist-run Mayan weaving cooperative
- 1990: Native American Graves Protection and Repatriation Act passed in the US
- 1990: American Indian Arts and Crafts Act passed in the US
- 1992: Crow's Shadow Institute of the Arts, a center for fine printmaking, is founded by Walla Walla artist James Lavadour on the Umatilla Indian Reservation.
- 1992: Eiteljorg Museum hosts their first annual Indian Market and Festival
- 1995: Edward Poitras (Plains Cree) represents Canada at the Venice Biennale, with Gerald McMaster (Plains Cree) curating.
- 1999: Native American Arts Alliance, curated by Nancy Mithlo (Chiricahua Apache) sponsors Native American artists Harry Fonseca, Bob Haozous, Jaune Quick-to-See Smith, Kay WalkingStick, Frank LaPena, Richard Ray Whitman, and poet Simon Ortiz in the Venice Biennale
- 2000: Mapuche printmaker Santos Chávez is granted the Altazor award and named "illustrious son" of Tirúa, Chile

=== 21st century ===
- 2004: National Museum of the American Indian opens its doors in Washington, DC
- 2005: Rebecca Belmore (Anishinaabe) represents Canada and James Luna (Luiseño) represents NMAI at the Venice Biennale.
- 2006: Chile hosts its first Biennial of Indigenous Art and Culture in Santiago, featuring over 120 artists from Chile's nine indigenous groups.
- 2006: The first Bienal Intercontinental de Arte Indigena (Intercontinental Indigenous Arts Biennial) is held in Quito, Ecuador
- 2009: Pottery by Jereldine Redcorn (Caddo), who singlehandedly revived her tribe's ceramic tradition, is exhibited in the Oval Office of the White House
- 2022: Cynthia Chavez Lamar is appointed the new director of the National Museum of the American Indian, and is the first Native American woman to serve as a Smithsonian museum director.

== See also ==
- Archaeological sites in Peru
- Cultural periods of Peru
- Indigenous art of the Americas
- Indigenous ceramics of the Americas
- List of indigenous artists of the Americas
- Mesoamerican chronology
- Native American Jewelry
- Pre-Columbian art
