= IAIA Museum of Contemporary Native Arts =

Museum in Santa Fe, New Mexico

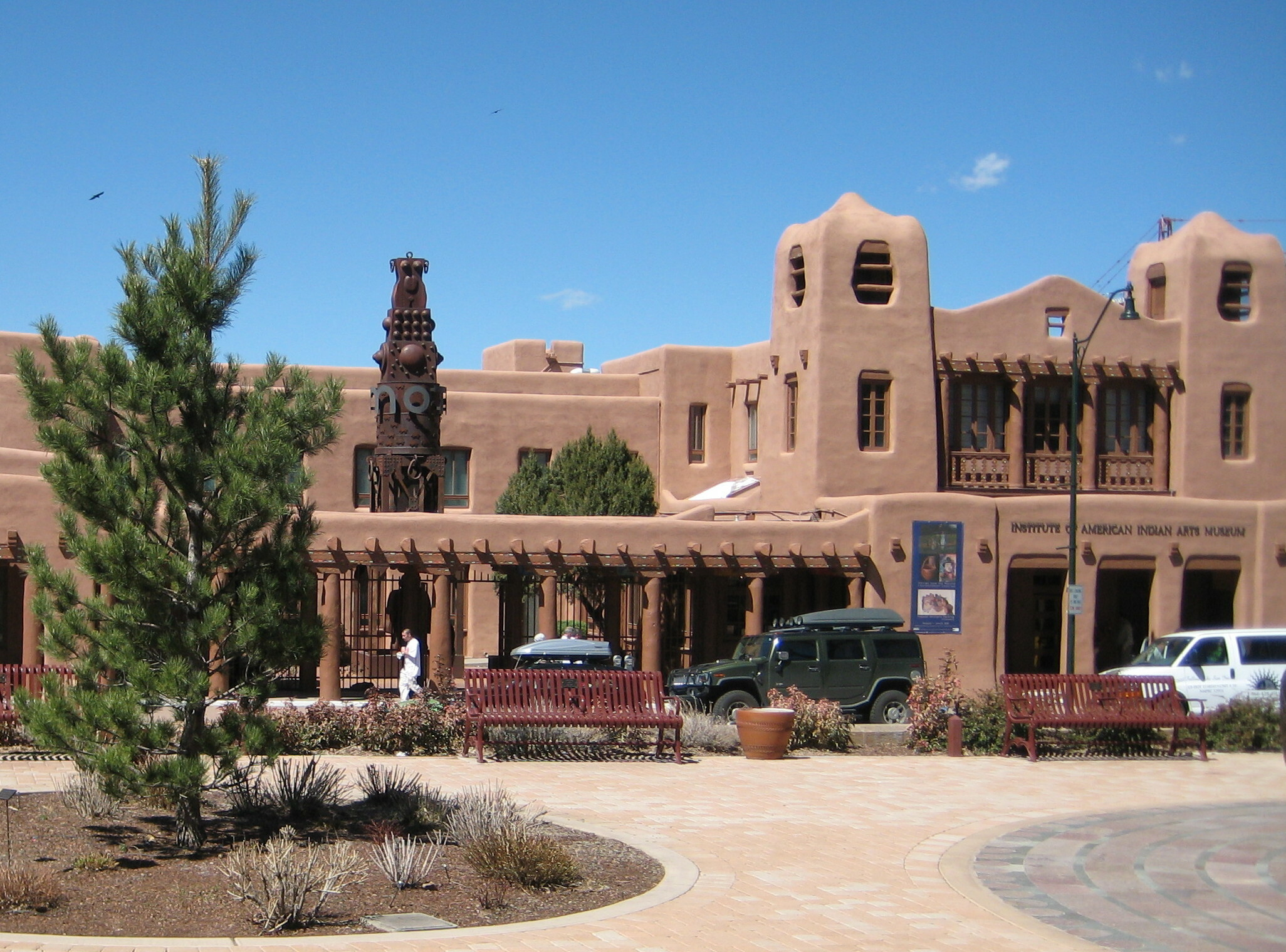
- The museum in 2004
- Interactive map of the IAIA Museum of Contemporary Native Arts area
- Alternative names: MoCNA

General information
- Location: 108 Cathedral Place, Santa Fe, New Mexico, United States
- Coordinates: 35°41′15″N 105°56′13″W
- Inaugurated: 1991
- Owner: Institute of American Indian Arts

The IAIA Museum of Contemporary Native Arts (abbreviated as MoCNA) is a museum in Santa Fe, New Mexico dedicated to collecting and showcasing works of art by contemporary Indigenous artists and is considered the only museum in the United States to do so.

== History ==
Founded by the Institute of American Indian Arts in 1991, the museum hosts nearly 10,000 works of art from 1962 and onward and is located in the Sante Fe Federal Building (the old Post Office), a historic Pueblo Revival building. Contemporary intertribal Native American art is the focus of exhibitions and the permanent collection. The MoCNA is located near the Santa Fe Plaza and Saint Francis Cathedral in the historic Santa Fe downtown area.

In 2020, the museum was one of 20 recipients for funding from the Ford Foundation's America's Cultural Treasures philanthropic initiative.

In 2025, the museum received an Access for All grant from the Art Bridges Foundation, allowing it to allow free admission on Fridays through to December 2026. In August of that year, the museum partnered with the National Taiwan Museum of Fine Arts to showcase Taiwanese Indigenous works.

As of March 2025, the Museum's Director is Patsy Phillips, and its Chief Curator is Manuela Well-Off-Man.

== Exhibitions and collections ==
The museum collects, exhibits and interprets progressive art works by Indigenous artists. It has an active public programming series. Objects in the collection, when not on exhibit, are held in the museum's 7,000 square foot storage facility located on the IAIA campus 12 miles south of the museum; the facility also includes conservation laboratories.

The Allan Houser (Chiricahua Apache) Sculpture Garden and Art Park is located in the courtyard west of the museum building. Selections of Houser's work is exhibited on a rotating basis, and is on loan from the Alan Houser Foundation.

== Gallery ==
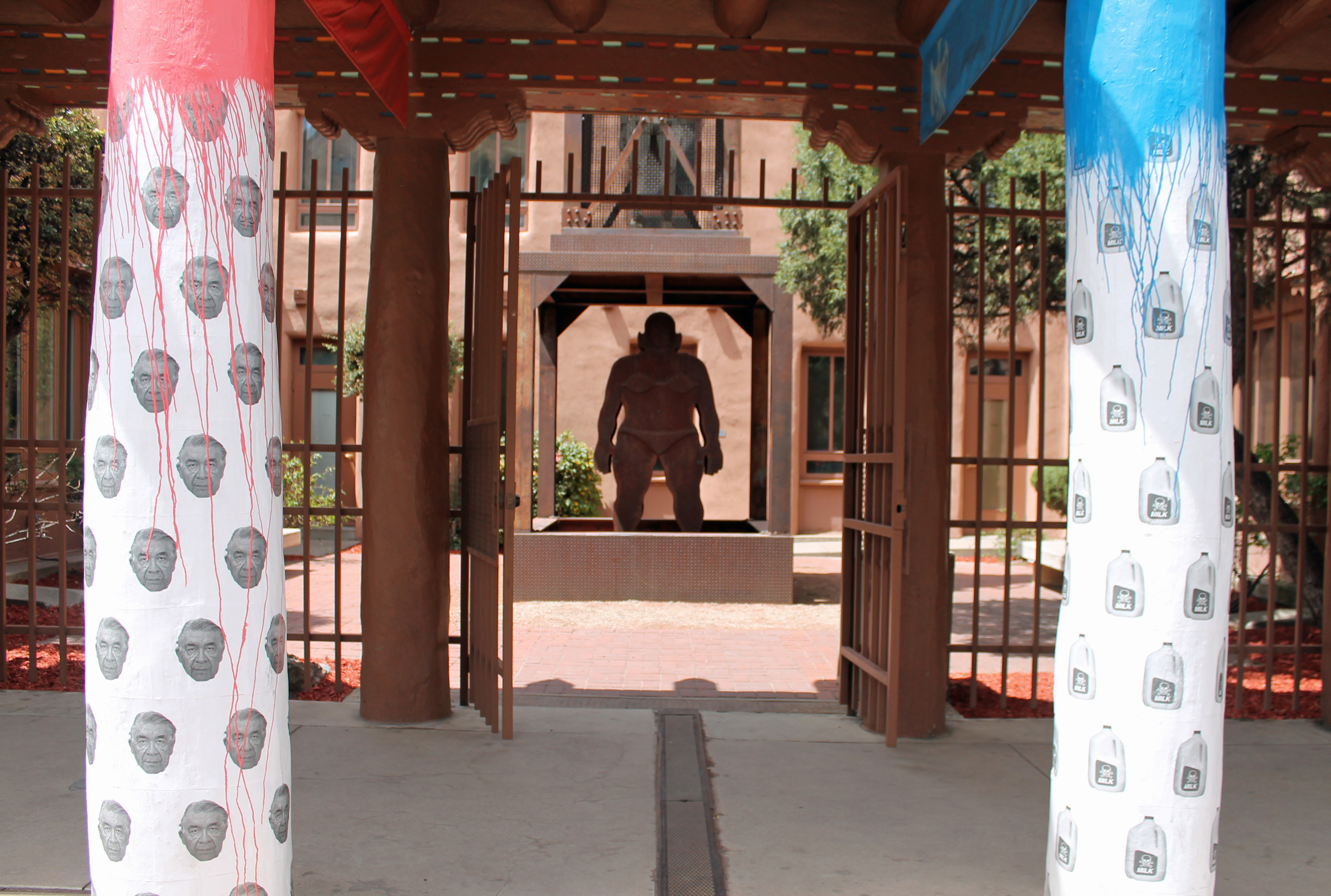
IAIA MoCNA columns flanking a sculpture by Bob Haozous (Chiricahua Apache)

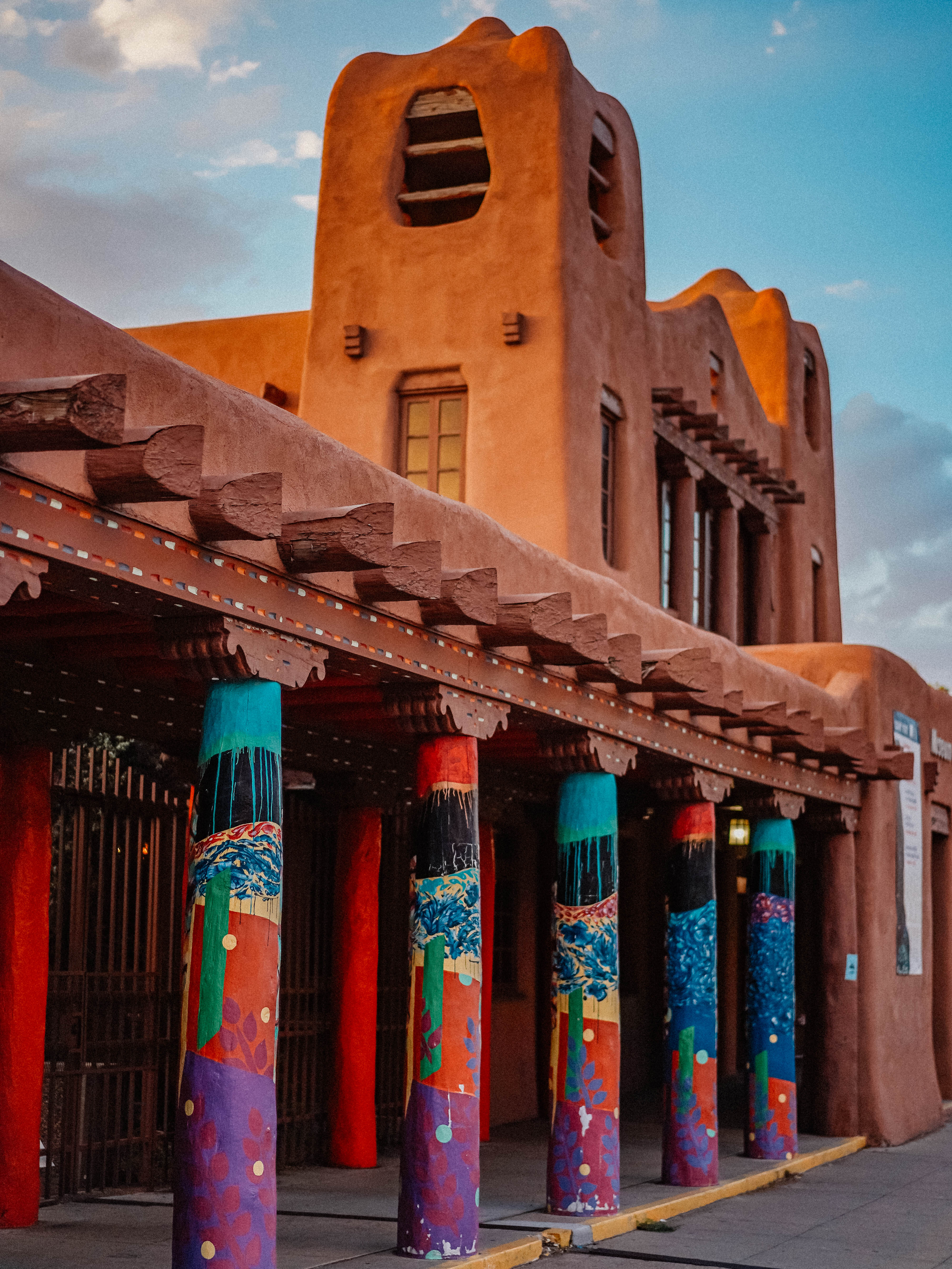
The main entrance of MoCNA

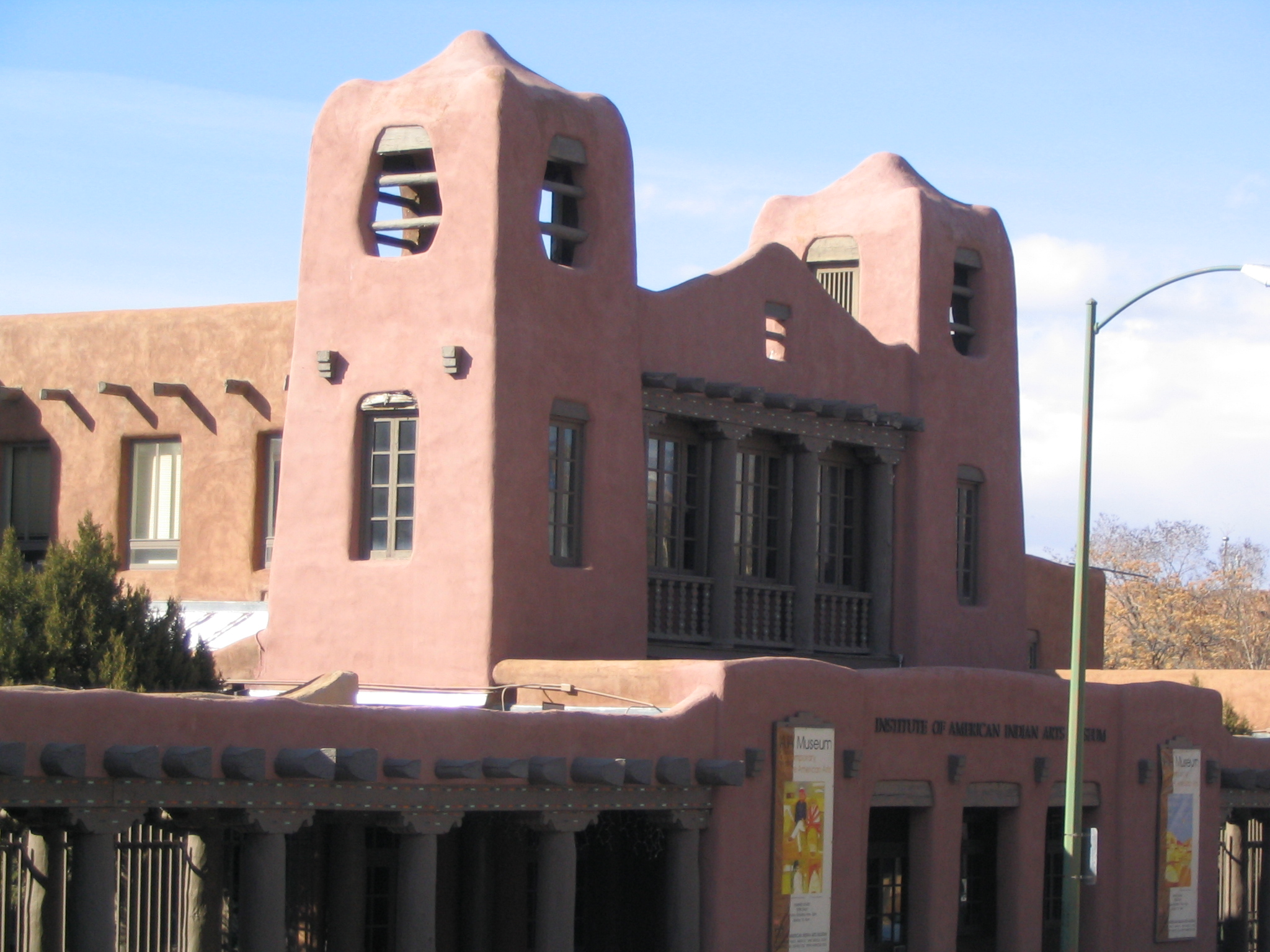
The MoCNA

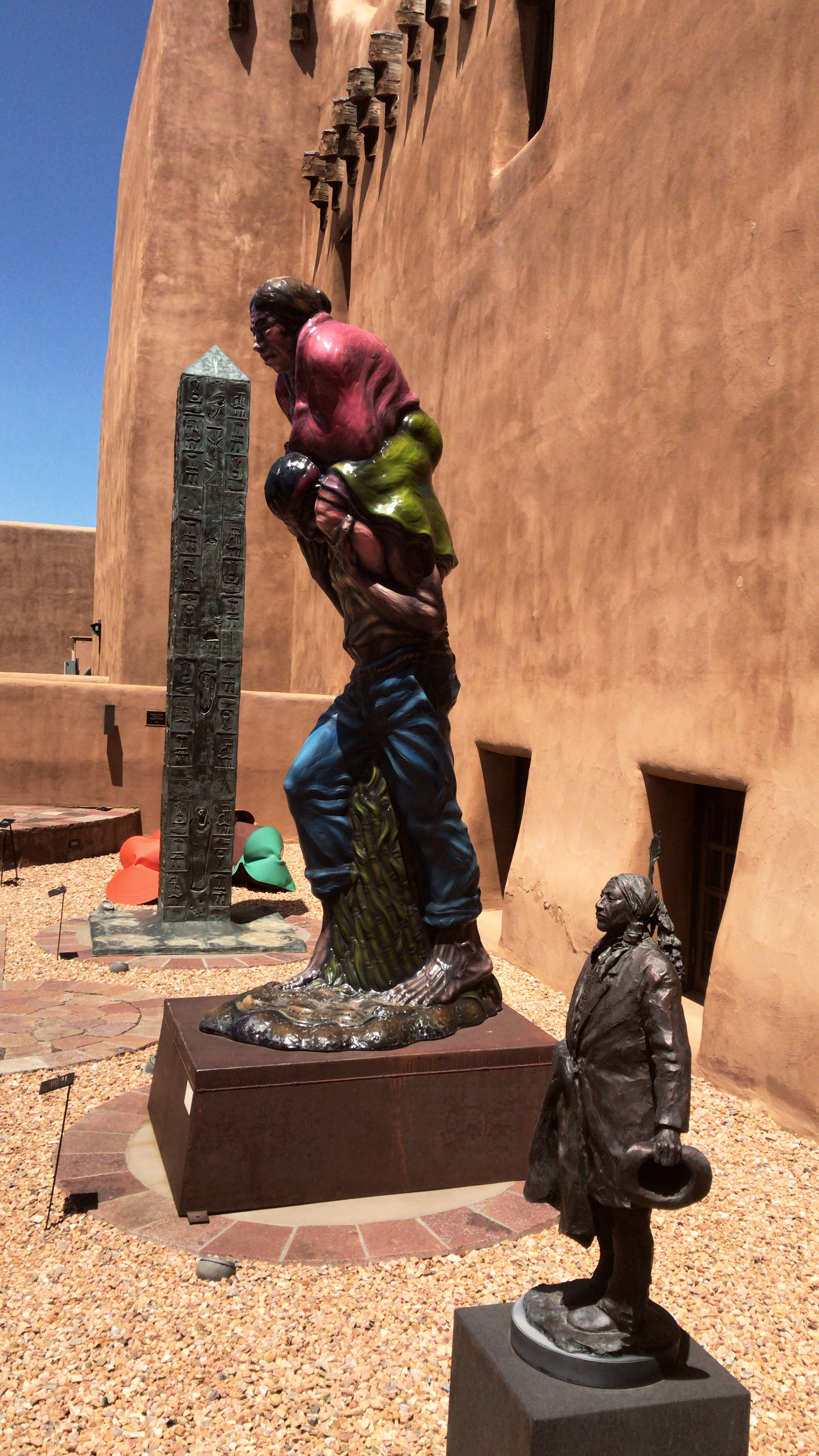
An outdoor sculpture exhibition at the MoCNA
