= Interior Museum =

Museum in Washington, D.C.

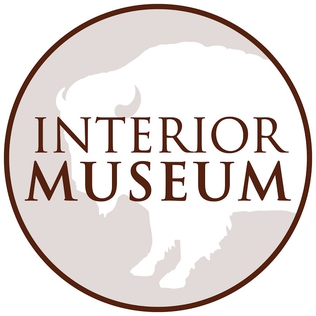

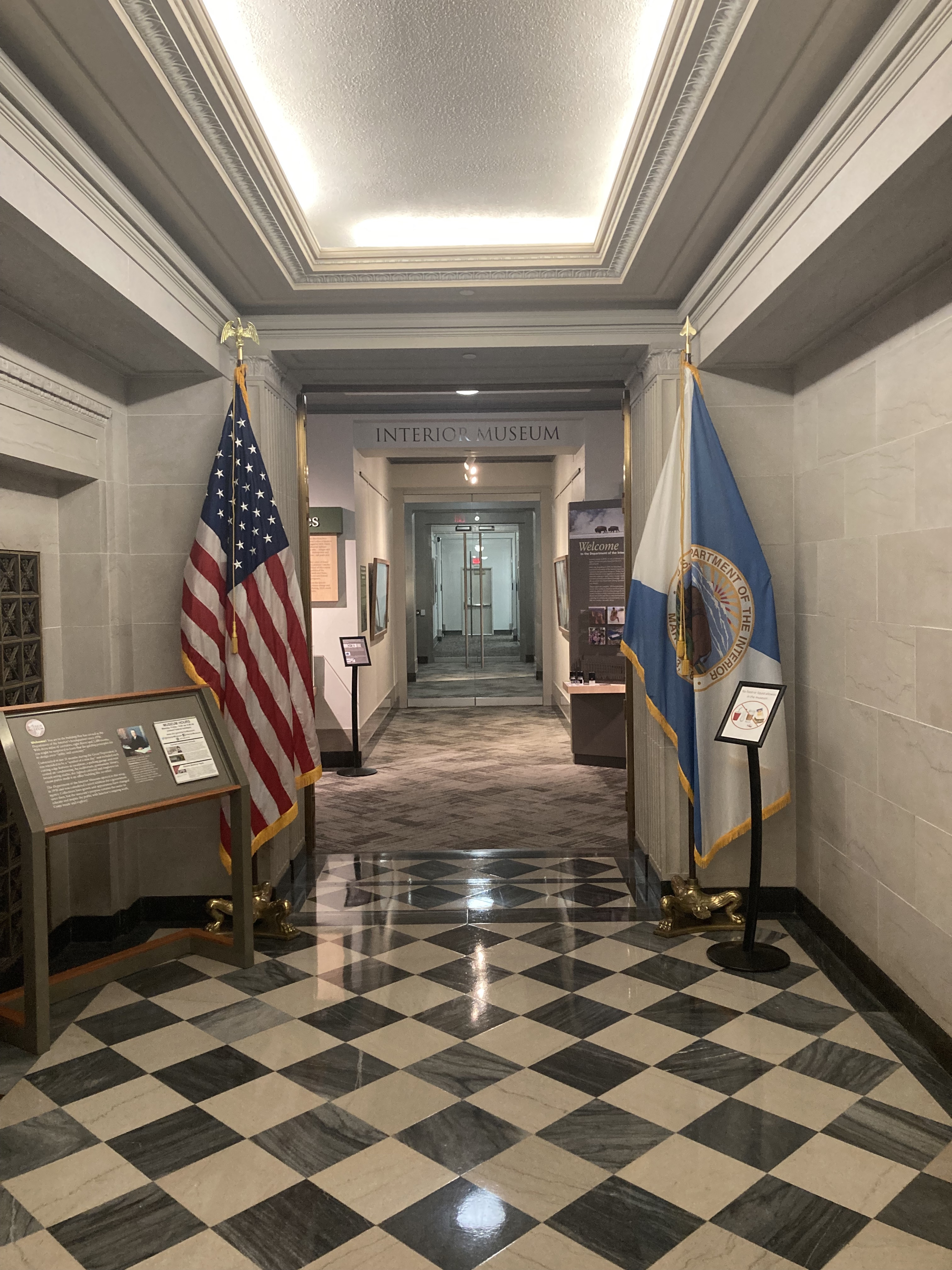
- The Interior Museum is located at the Main Interior Building, the Department of the Interior headquarters.

- Location within Washington, D.C.
- Established: March 8, 1938
- Location: 1849 C Street NW; Washington, D.C.
- Coordinates: 38.893642°N 77.042592°W
- Public transit access: Farragut North Farragut West
- Website: doi.gov/interiormuseum

The Interior Museum is a museum operated by the United States Department of the Interior and housed at the department's headquarters at the Stewart Lee Udall Main Interior Building in Washington, D.C., on the first floor.

When the Interior Museum opened in the U.S. Department of the Interior's newly constructed headquarters in the nation's capital on March 8, 1938, a museum was considered a novel element to include in a federal office building. However, the Secretary of the Interior at that time—Harold Ickes (1874–1952)—was a proponent of the arts and also strongly believed in the importance of having the American people understand the work of the department. To this day, the Interior Museum's mission remains to actively educate and inspire employees and the public about the ongoing stewardship of the nation's public lands, natural resources, and cultural heritage. The Interior Museum's collection contains more than 8,000 objects of historical, cultural, and scientific importance relating directly to the activities of the department.

In addition to developing exhibitions and public programs, Interior Museum staff also conduct public tours highlighting the elements that made the Stewart Lee Udall Department of the Interior Building a "symbol of a new day" during the Great Depression. The headquarters building contains more New Deal-era murals than any other government building, featuring such artists as John Steuart Curry, Maynard Dixon, William Gropper, Allan Houser, Velino Herrera, and Millard Sheets, plus a series of photomurals by Ansel Adams.
