= May We Have Peace =

1992 sculpture by Allan Houser

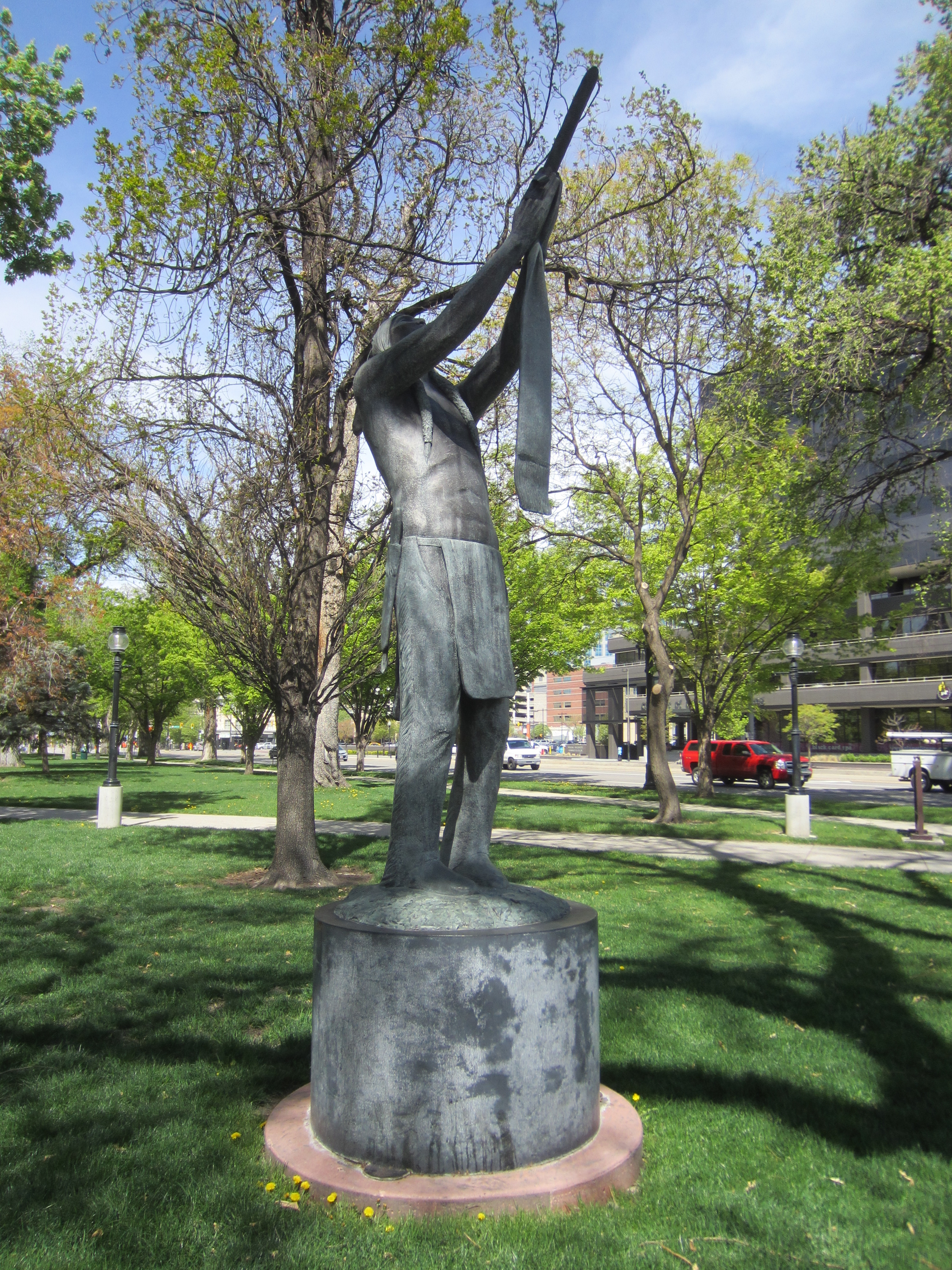
- The statue in 2021
- Artist: Allan Houser
- Year: 1992
- Medium: Bronze sculpture
- Dimensions: 11 feet (3.4 m) tall
- Location: Salt Lake City, Utah, U.S.
- 40°45′37.2″N 111°53′8.6″W

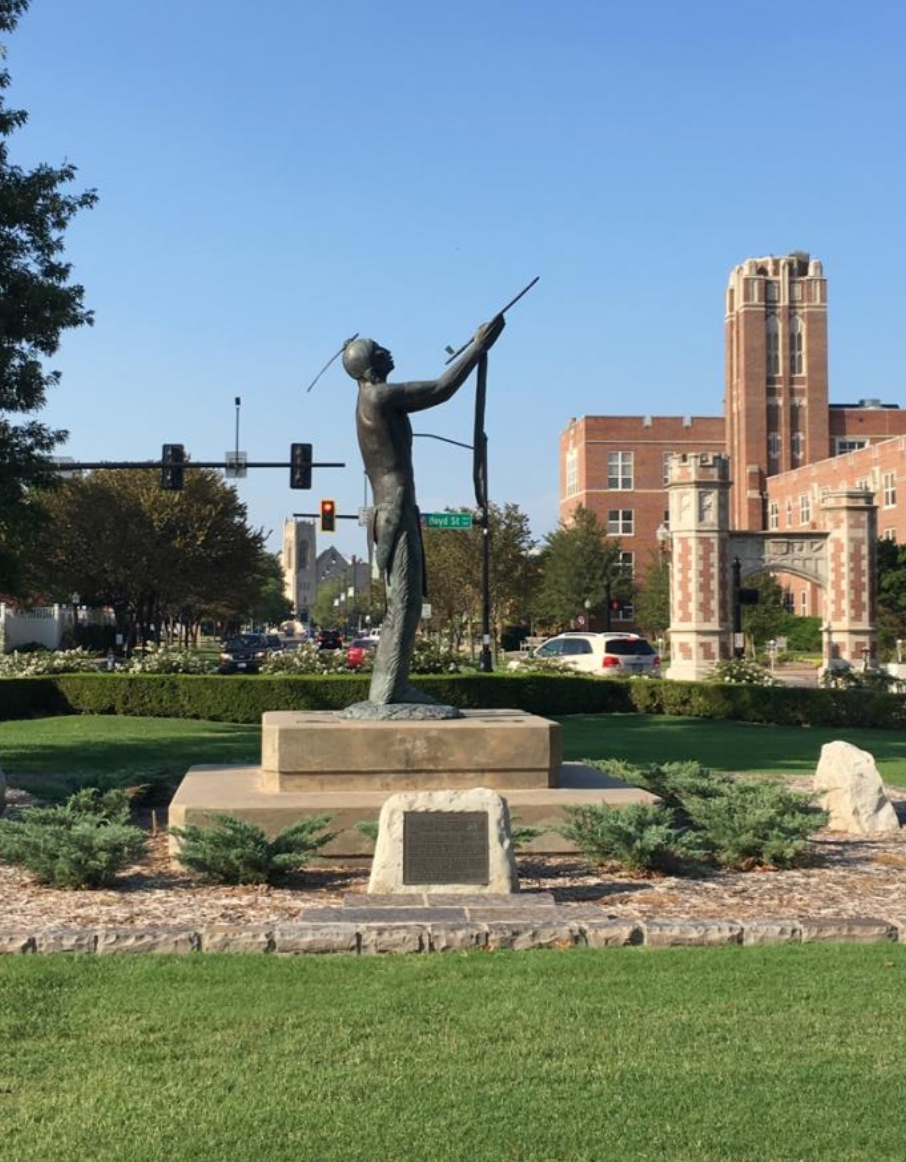
View of MAY WE HAVE PEACE from Parrington Oval at the University of Oklahoma, Norman, OK.

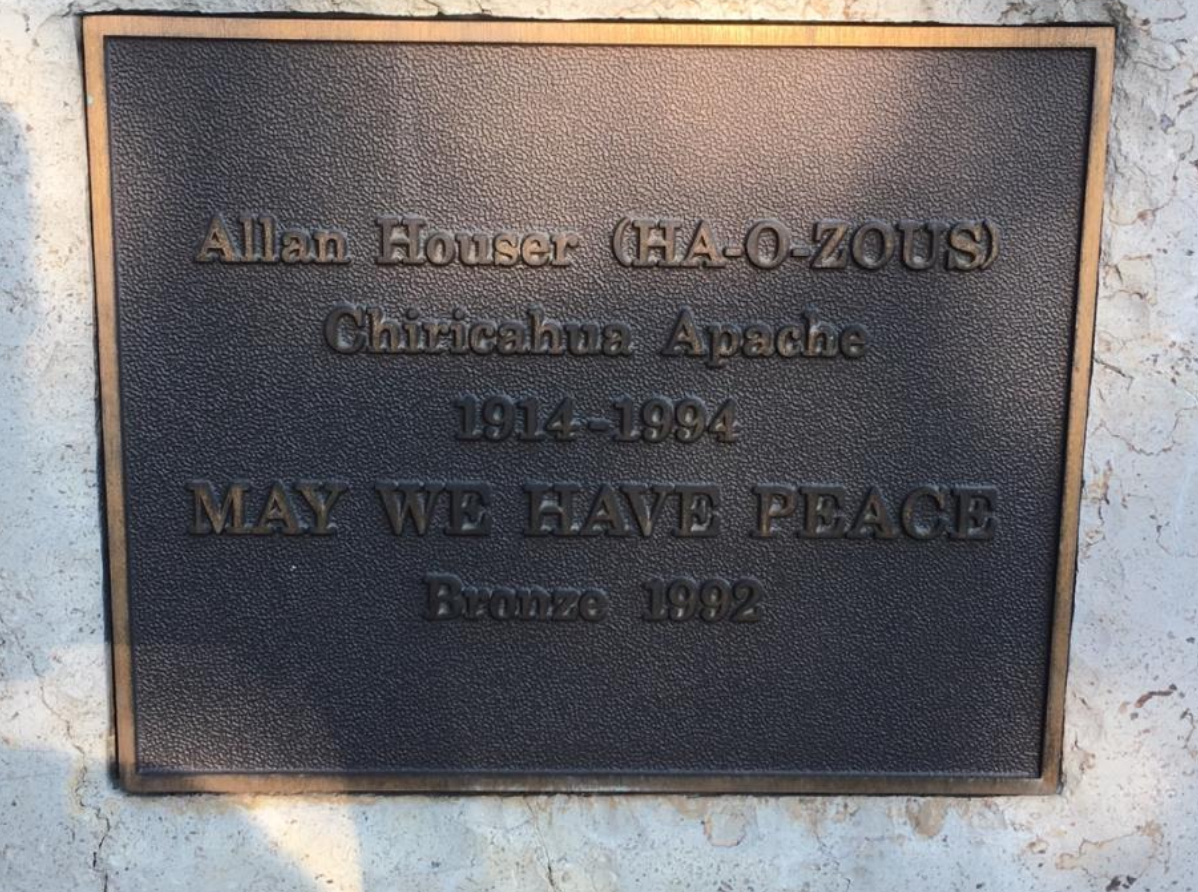
Found on the Norman, OK MAY WE HAVE PEACE. The plaque reads: Allan Houser (HA-O-ZOUS) Chiricahua Apache 1914-1994 MAY WE HAVE PEACE Bronze, 1992.

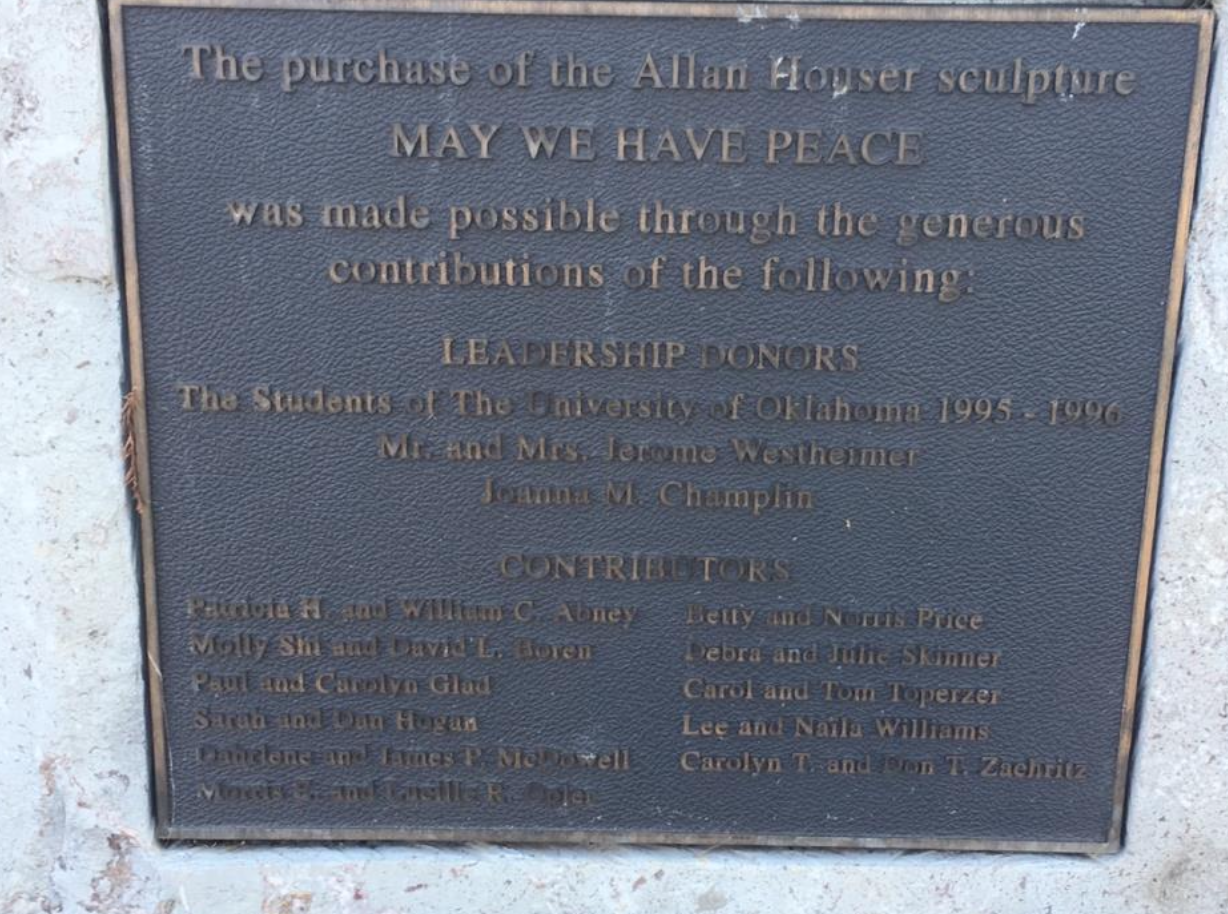
Found on the Norman, OK MAY WE HAVE PEACE. The plaque reads: The purchase of the Allan Houser sculpture MAY WE HAVE PEACE was made possible through the generous contributions of the following: LEADERSHIP DONORS; The Students of The University of Oklahoma 1995; Mr. and Mrs. Jerome Westheimer; Joanna M. Champlin. CONTRIBUTORS: Patricia H. and William C. Abney; Molly Shi and David L. Boren; Paul and Carolyn Glad; Sarah and Dan Hogan; Cahrlene and James P. McDowell; Morris H. and Lucille R. Coler; Betty and Norris Price; Debra and Julie Skinner; Carol and Tom Toperzer; Lee and Naila Williams; Carolyn T. and Don T. Zaehritz.

May We Have Peace is a 1992 bronze sculpture by Allan Houser, installed in Salt Lake City, Utah. The 11-foot-tall (3.4 m) statue depicts a Plains Indian man holding aloft a ceremonial pipe.
