= Nancy Marie Mithlo =

Native American curator, writer, and professor

Nancy Marie Mithlo is a Chiricahua Apache curator, writer, and professor. Mithlo has worked as the chair of American Indian Studies at the Autry National Center Institute and as a professor of gender studies and American Indian Studies at the University of California, Los Angeles. She is the author and editor of several books about Native Americans and Indigenous art. Her exhibitions have been shown concurrently with the Venice Biennale.

== Biography ==
Mithlo is Chiricahua Apache, is enrolled in the Fort Sill Apache Tribe, and has family in Apache, Oklahoma. She was born in 1961 and grew up in Mississippi.

Mithlo attended the Institute of American Indian Arts and earned her bachelor's degree from Appalachian State University in 1986, and her master's degree in anthropology from Stanford University in 1988. In 1993, she earned a doctorate in cultural anthropology from Stanford University.

== Work ==
Mithlo has worked as the chair of American Indian Studies at the Autry National Center Institute. She has worked as a professor of gender studies and American Indian Studies at the University of California, Los Angeles.

Mithlo has helped curate and create nine collateral exhibitions during the Venice Biennale. Two exhibitions, "Air, Land, Seed" and "Octopus Dreams," were shown during the 2013 Venice Biennale. In the exhibition, "The People's Home: The United American Indian Involvement Photographic Project" held at These Days Gallery in 2019, Mithlo looks into how Native Americans live in modern Los Angeles.

Mithlo edited Manifestations: New Native Art Criticism in 2011. Native Peoples magazine wrote that Manifestations contained "an excellent cross-section of the Indigenous art community today." The Wíčazo Ša Review discusses how Manifestations focuses on how mentorship and continuity are important aspects of Indigenous art. In 2014, Mithlo edited a book about the work of Horace Poolaw, For a Love of His People: The Photography of Horace Poolaw. The Daily Beast called the book "an outstanding work of scholarship and a commanding visual document." Mithlo edited Making History, published by UNM Press, in late 2020. Mithlo describes the purpose of Making History is to provide "a scaffold of resources for emerging Native arts scholars, Native and non-Native readers, students, and academics who wish to understand the tenor and tone of what this field is about and how to approach teaching and learning about American Indian arts."

== Selected bibliography ==
- 'Our Indian Princess': Subverting the Stereotype. Santa Fe, New Mexico: School for Advanced Research. 2008. ISBN 9781930618978.
- Manifestations: New Native Art Criticism. Santa Fe, New Mexico: Museum of Contemporary Native Arts. 2011. ISBN 9780615489049.
- For a Love of His People: The Photography of Horace Poolaw. Washington, D.C.: National Museum of the American Indian. 2014. ISBN 9780300197457.
- Knowing Native Arts. Lincoln: University of Nebraska Press. 2020. ISBN 9781496202123.
- Making History. University of New Mexico Press. 2020. ISBN 978-0826362094.
