= Joseph Lonewolf =

American potter (1932 – 2014)

Joseph Lonewolf (January 26, 1932 – November 9, 2014) was a Native American potter from Santa Clara Pueblo, New Mexico, United States. He was known for his use of historical methods and his development of sgraffito and bas-relief techniques, which used a nail filed to a point as his main carving tool. The son of pottery artist and historical reconstructionist Camilio Sunflower Tafoya, Lonewolf was a precision mining equipment machinist until 1971, when a back injury forced him to retire.

His works, which have often been referred to as "pottery jewels", are notable for the use of Mimbres designs on sienna miniatures. His Designs are often reflect geometrical animal forms, He said "Each pot had a meaning but most are about nature".

== Clay ==
When Joseph and his family go out to gather clay they do it with the utmost respect. Before the clay can be taken from Mother Earth they must say a prayer asking to take the clay and tell the clay mother that they are going to take her and make her into a beautiful pot. The clay is brought home and water is added to turn the clay to a liquid form known as slip. The slip is then strained through a screen to take out any rocks or roots and then the clay can be dried wedged up to be used.

== Firing ==
After the wear had been carved away the piece is allowed to dry to a bone dry state and it is time be fired. Four tin cans are set up and a metal basket is placed on them to allow for good air flow. The pots are then placed in the basket and a fire is built under the basket. Planks of bark are leaned agents the stack in a tepee form and the whole pile is lit on fire. After the bon fire burns down, for an amount of time that is learned from years of experience, horse manure is shoved on to smother the flame and create a reduction atmosphere in the firing. The reduction causes the wear to turn black in color giving this work a particular look. "We do not talk about a pot until it is complete, If we do it will brake in the firing"

Lonewolf's work was explored in a series on American Indian artists for the Public Broadcasting System (PBS). Other artists in the series included R. C. Gorman, Helen Hardin, Allan Houser, Charles Loloma, and Fritz Scholder.
