= Clara Archilta =

Native American painter and beadworker from Oklahoma, U.S. (1912–1994)

- Kiowa Apache Black Feet Dance (1959) by Cara Archilta shows Manatidie dancers in an older version of the Plains Apache's Blackfeet Social dance
- Born: Clara Williams; September 26, 1912; Tonkawa, Oklahoma
- Died: September 30, 1994 (aged 82); Apache, Oklahoma
- Resting place: Memory Lane Cemetery.
- Citizenship: Kiowa Indian Tribe of Oklahoma, American
- Education: Chilocco Indian School,
- Movement: Southern Plains Flatstyle
- Spouse: Ward Archilta

Clara Williams Archilta (September 26, 1912–30 September 1994), was a Kiowa/Apache/Tonkawa painter and beadworker from Oklahoma. A self-taught artist with no formal art training, Archilta is known for her watercolor painting and her pictorial beadwork.

== Personal life ==
Clara Williams was born in Tonkawa, Oklahoma. Her parents were David Williams (Tonkawa) and Helen Tseeltsesah-Sunrise (Kiowa/Apache). Clara attended Boone School in Apache, Oklahoma, followed by two years at the U.S. Chilocco Indian School, through the eighth grade. She married Ward Archilta and had six children between 1930 and 1949.

== Art career ==
Her husband died in 1956, and Archilta began to paint the following year as a means to support her family. Despite a severely injured arm, she soon began to sell her work and make a name for herself. She was the first woman to exhibit a collection of paintings at the American Indian Exposition (Anadarko, Oklahoma). She also exhibited work at the Philbrook Museum of Art. Her work has been in the collection of the Bureau of Indian Affairs in Anadarko.

Archilta was also the head woman dancer for the Apache Blackfeet Society. In the late 1950s, she painted a rare version of the Kiowa-Apache Blackfeet Dance. In the painting, the Manatidie dancers are depicted in an earlier version of the dance which was no longer performed after the early 20th century.

== Death ==
She died in 1994 at the age of 82 in Apache, Oklahoma. Her funeral was held at the Apache Tribal Complex in Anadarko. She was buried at Memory Lane Cemetery.
