= R. C. Gorman =

American Navajo painter and printmaker (1931–2005)

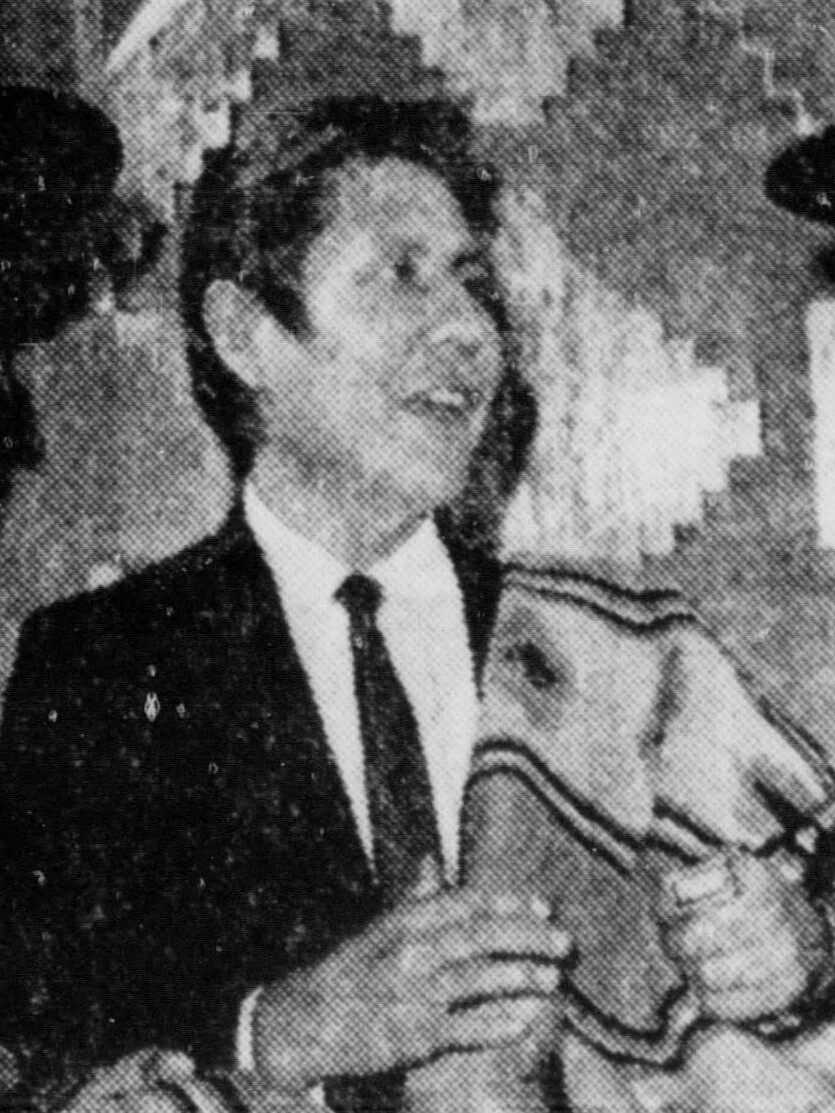
- Gorman in 1967
- Born: Rudolph Carl Gorman; July 26, 1931; Chinle, Arizona near Canyon de Chelly, Navajo Nation
- Died: November 3, 2005 (aged 74); Albuquerque, New Mexico
- Education: Arizona State College (now Northern Arizona University); Mexico City College (now Fundación Universidad de las Américas, Puebla)
- Known for: Artist; Oil painter Lithographer; Sculptor
- Father: Carl Nelson Gorman

Natoma, patinated bronze sculpture of a Navajo dancer by R. C. Gorman, East–West Center, Honolulu, Hawaii

Rudolph Carl Gorman (July 26, 1931 – November 3, 2005) was a Native American artist of the Navajo Nation. He was referred to as "the Picasso of American Indian artists" by The New York Times, and his paintings are primarily of Native American women and characterized by fluid forms and vibrant colors, though he also worked in sculpture, ceramics, and stone lithography. He was also an avid lover of cuisine, authoring four cookbooks, (with accompanying drawings) called Nudes and Food.

== Early life and education ==
Rudolph Carl Gorman was born in Chinle, Arizona, to Adele Katherine Brown and Carl Nelson Gorman. His father, Carl, was one of the original twenty-nine Navajo Code Talkers, who, along with his colleagues, developed the unbreakable code American forces used in the Pacific Theater during World War II.

R. C. Gorman grew up in a traditional Navajo hogan, and began drawing at age 3. His grandmother helped raise him, recounting Navajo legends and enumerating his genealogy of artist ancestors. She kindled his desire to become an artist. While tending sheep in Canyon de Chelly with his aunts, he used to draw on the rocks, sand, and mud, and made sculptures with the clay, with his earliest subjects including Mickey Mouse and Shirley Temple.

He credited a teacher, Jenny Lind at Ganado Presbyterian Mission School, for his inspiration to become a full-time artist. After he left high school, he served in the United States Navy before entering college, where he majored in literature and minored in art at Northern Arizona University.

In 1958, he received the first scholarship from the Navajo Tribal Council to study outside of the United States, and enrolled in the art program at Mexico City College. There he learned of and was influenced by the work of Diego Rivera. He later studied art at San Francisco State University, where he also worked as a model. He was openly gay.

== Career ==
Gorman had professional art career for 42 years, from his first public exhibition by an established gallery in 1963 until his death in 2005. During this time, he produced over 500 lithographic and serigraphic works, at least 28 Bronze Sculptures, as well as an unknown number of papercasts, ceramic editions, tapestries, glass etchings, and one-of-a-kind oil and acrylic paintings, oil pastel drawings, and sketches.

In 1963, Gorman held his first exhibition at the Zieniewics Gallery in San Francisco, CA. The following year, he and his father Carl N. Gorman were invited to do a two-person show, "New Directions in American Indian", at the Philbrook Art Center in Tulsa, OK, and exhibited together at the Heard Museum's Gallery of Indian Art in Phoenix, Arizona, which was reviewed in the Arizona Republic.

In 1966, Gorman helped organize the American Indian Arts Group in San Francisco and served as the chairman of its painting committee.

After his 1965 sold out exhibition in Taos, Gorman borrowed money from his parents to purchase the Manchester Gallery from Henry Manchester and Dorothy Brett in 1968. He renamed it the Navajo Gallery, and it was first Native American owned fine art gallery. He opened with 55 artists showing.

After learning to make lithographs with Jose Sanchez in Mexico City in 1966, Gorman resumed the practice in 1971 and made lithographs at the Tamarind Institute in Albuquerque, New Mexico. He will go on to produce at least 52 lithographs between 1971 and 1975 with the Tamarind.

Gorman attended the Metropolitan Museum of Art's 1973 exhibition Masterworks from the Museum of the American Indian in New York City. He was the only living artist to be included in the show and his artwork was used for the front and back covers of the show's catalog. In their review of the show, the New York Times referred to Gorman as "the Picasso of American-Indian art", an honor as Picasso had died at 91 in April of that same year.

Gorman's paintings were added to the Museum of the American Indian on Broadway in New York City in 1974; The New York Times wrote that "no one stands higher among living American Indian painters."

In the 1990s, actor Gary Busey said he was cast to portray Gorman in a film for TNT. It's unclear what became of that project.

Gorman's work was explored in a 1995 series on American Indian artists for PBS, among artists including Helen Hardin, Charles Loloma, Allan Houser, Joseph Lonewolf, and Fritz Scholder.

== Later life ==
In 1998, he donated art for Tom Udall's campaign for election to the U.S. House of Representatives. On April 1, 2003, Gorman donated his personal library to Diné College at the request of the college's president, Cassandra Manuelito-Kerkvliet.

On September 18, 2005, Gorman fell at his home and was taken to Holy Cross Hospital in Taos. On September 26, he was transferred to University of New Mexico Hospital (in Albuquerque). He died at age 74 on November 3. New Mexico governor Bill Richardson ordered flags flown at half-staff in his honor. He was buried at Colonias Cemetery.

== Influences ==
Gorman learned about the work of the Mexican social realists: Diego Rivera, David Siqueiros, and Rufino Tamayo. He became inspired by their colors and forms to change from abstraction to abstract realism. He used abstract forms and shapes to create his own unique, personal realistic style, recognizable to all who are acquainted with his work. While in Mexico, he also learned stone lithography from a master printer, Jose Sanchez. He used lithography throughout his life as a means of making original multiple images of his inspirations, often working by drawing directly on the stones from which the lithographs were printed.

== Awards and honors ==
- R. C. Gorman Day, State of New Mexico (January 8, 1979)
- R. C. Gorman Day, San Francisco, California (March 18, 1986)
- New Mexico's Governor's Award of Excellence (1989)
- Alumnae of the Year Award, National Association of Colleges and Universities (November 1993)
- Camino Real Award, Hispanic Chamber of Commerce, Santa Fe, New Mexico (1995)
- Los Amigos del Turismo Cultural Award, Santa Fe, New Mexico (1996)
- A Golden Palm Star on the Palm Springs Walk of Stars was dedicated to him (2002).
- After Gorman's death, New Mexico governor Bill Richardson ordered flags flown at half-staff in his honor (2005)
