= Bob Haozous =

American sculptor

- Born: Robert Haozous; April 1, 1943 (age 83); Los Angeles, California
- Citizenship: Fort Sill Apache Tribe of Oklahoma, United States
- Education: BFA, California College of Arts and Crafts
- Known for: sculpture, jewelry, painting, printmaking
- Notable work: Cultural Crossroads, Apache Holocaust Memorial
- Movement: Apache art
- Website: http://www.bobhaozous.com/

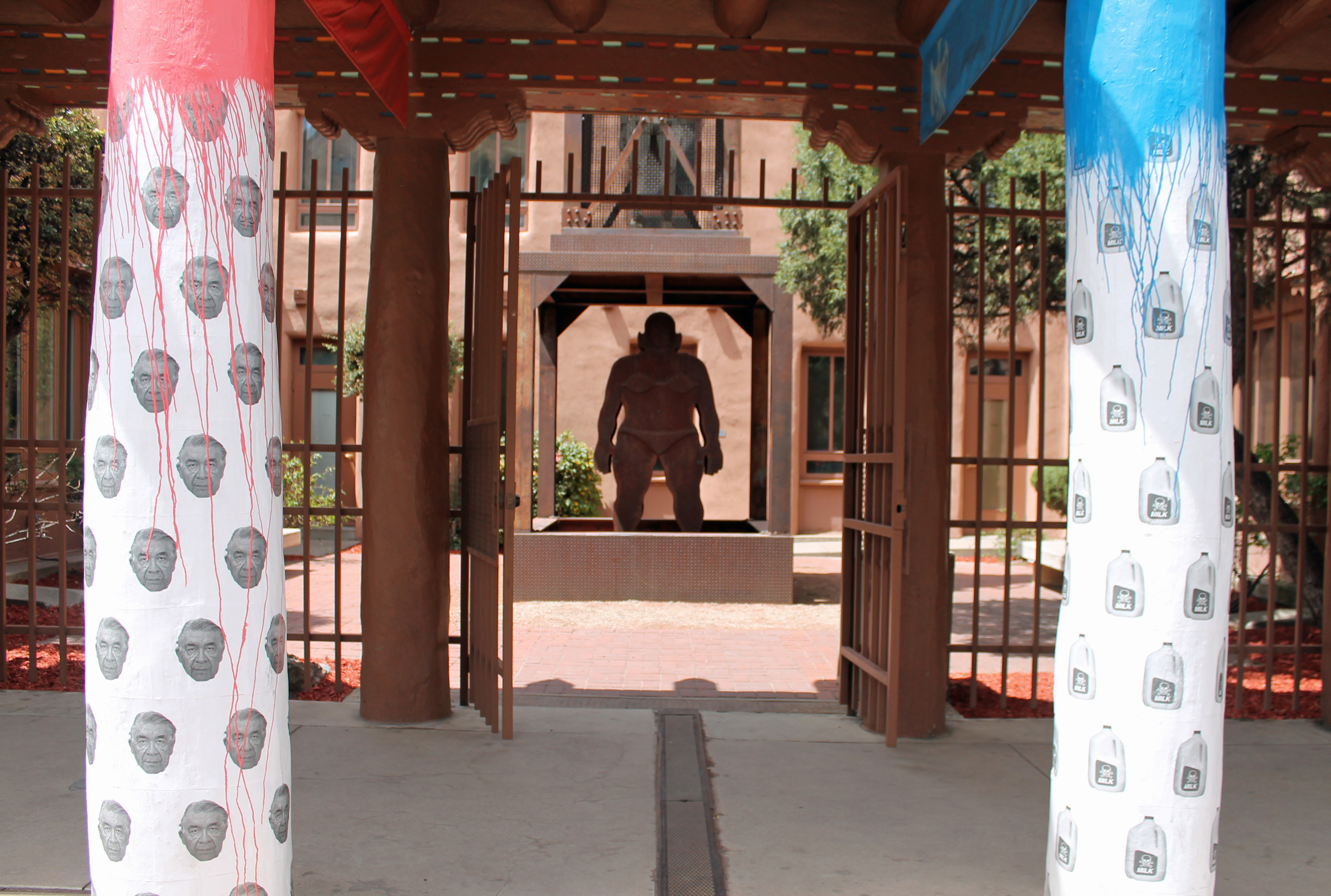
Bob Haozous sculpture (center) at the Museum of Contemporary Native Arts in Santa Fe, 2013

Bob Haozous is a Chiricahua Apache sculptor from Santa Fe, New Mexico. He is enrolled in the Fort Sill Apache Tribe of Oklahoma.

== Background ==
Bob Haozous was born on 1 April 1943 in Los Angeles, California. His parents are Anna Marie Gallegos, a Navajo-Mestiza textile artist, and the late Allan Houser (1914–1994), a famous 20th-century Apache sculptor. As a child, Haozous spent time in Apache, Oklahoma, his tribe's headquarters. His parents both taught at Intermountain Indian School, in Brigham City, Utah.

=== Education and military service ===
Haozous studied at Utah State University before enlisting in the US Navy, where he served for four years on board of the USS Frank Knox (DD-742) during the Vietnam War. After the war, Haozous attended the California College of Arts and Crafts in Oakland, California, where he earned his BFA degree in sculpture in 1971.

== Artwork ==
Haozous works in a range of media, from drawing, painting, and printmaking to jewelry, but his primary focus is on sculpture, especially monumental public works. He sculpts in steel, stone, wood, and aluminum.

His work is often humorous and extremely politically charged. He creates work about his Apache heritage, the environment–especially climate change–and institutional racism.

== Art career ==
As an emerging artist, Haozous exhibited at the annual SWAIA Santa Fe Indian Market, from 1971 until 1991. He moved on to a world stage and has participated in the Venice Biennale in Venice, Italy, in both 1999 and 2001.

== Notable exhibitions ==
- 2018–19: Old Man Looking Backward: Bob Haozous, Wheelwright Museum of the American Indian, Santa Fe, NM
- 2006: Relations: Indigenous Dialogue, IAIA Museum of Contemporary Native Arts, with catalogue
- 2001 Umbilicus, Venice Biennale, Italy
- 2000 Who Stole the Tee Pee, Curated by Atlatl, George Gustav Heye Center, New York City, New York
- 1999 Ceremonial, Venice Biennale, Italy
- 1971–1991 SWAIA Santa Fe Indian Market, New Mexico.

== Notable collections ==
- British Museum
- Heard Museum, Phoenix, Arizona
- Institute of American Indian Arts Museum, Santa Fe, NM
- Albuquerque Museum of Art and History, New Mexico
- Millicent Rogers Museum, Taos, New Mexico
- Museum of Indian Arts and Culture, Santa Fe, NM
- National Museum of the American Indian, Washington, DC
- Philbrook Museum of Art, Tulsa, Oklahoma
- Roswell Museum and Art Center, Roswell, New Mexico
- Southwest Museum, Los Angeles, California
- Westphalian Museum of Natural History, Munster, Germany
- Dresdner Bank Collection, Stuttgart, Germany
- Museum der Weltkulturen, Frankfurt am Main, Germany
- Norsk Sjøfartsmuseum, Trondheim, Norway
- Wheelwright Museum, Santa Fe, New Mexico
- Haffenreffer Museum of Anthropology at Brown University, Providence, RI
- Daybreak Star Cultural Center, Seattle, Washington

He has also created public art for the cities of Albuquerque, New Mexico; Philadelphia, Pennsylvania; San Diego, California; Seattle, Washington; and Tulsa, Oklahoma, as well as for the Seattle Seahawks Stadium.

== Personal ==
Bob Haozous lives in Santa Fe, New Mexico. He has three children and four brothers. His brother Philip Haozous is also a respected sculptor.
