= Fort Sill Apache Tribe =

Federally recognized Native American tribe in Oklahoma

Fort Sill—Chiricahua—Warm Springs—Apache Tribe
Total population
- 650

Regions with significant populations
- United States, Oklahoma

Languages
- English Language, Apache language

Religion
- Christianity, Native American Church, traditional tribal religion

Related ethnic groups
- Other Apache people (Plains Apache, Jicarilla Apache, Lipan Apache, Mescalero Apache, and Western Apache) and Navajo

The Fort Sill—Chiricahua—Warm Springs—Apache Tribe is the federally recognized Native American tribe of Chiricahua Warm Springs Apache in Oklahoma. They were formerly known as the Fort Sill Apache Tribe of Oklahoma.

== Government ==
Map of Fort Sill Apache Tribe of Oklahoma's tribal jurisdictional area (OTSA) and nearby jurisdiction areas. Shared with Kiowa Tribe, Comanche Nation and Apache Tribe of Oklahoma.

The Fort Sill Apache Tribe is headquartered in Apache, Oklahoma. Tribal enrollment, which requires a 1/16 minimum blood quantum (equivalent to one great-great-grandparent), stands at 650. The tribe continues to maintain close connections to the Chiricahua Apache who were moved to the Mescalero Apache Reservation in the late 19th century.

As of 2025, the current administration is:

- Chairperson: Jennifer Heminokeky
- Vice Chairperson: Bryan Jones
- Committee Member: James Buckner
- Committee Member: Naomi Hartford
- Committee Member: Jeanette Mann
- Committee Member: Douglas Spores

== Lands ==
Location of the Fort Sill Apache Indian Reservation in New Mexico

The tribal jurisdictional area, as opposed to a reservation, spans Caddo, Comanche, and Grady Counties in Oklahoma. A private landholder returned four acres of sacred land in Cochise County, Arizona to the tribe, and it is included in their trust lands.

In 2011, the tribe won the right to establish a reservation in New Mexico. They now control 30 acres (12 ha) near Deming, New Mexico.

== Economic development and tribal programs ==
The tribe operates its own housing program, Fort Sill Apache Industries, and the Fort Sill Apache Casino in Lawton. The tribe's 2008 economic impact was $10 million.

Working with the US Environmental Protection Agency (EPA), in 2007 the Fort Sill Tribe began to set up an environmental protection office: to abate illegal dumping, encourage recycling, train certified water operators, and to educate the public about environmental issues.

== History ==
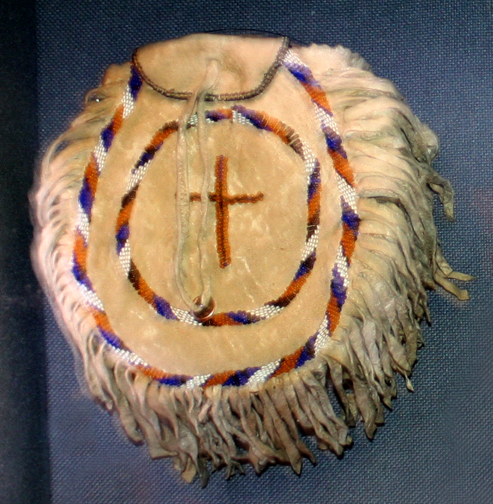
Chiricahua beaded pouch, Oklahoma, Oklahoma History Center

The Fort Sill Apache Tribe is composed of Chiricahua Apache, who were made up of 4 bands:

- Chihende (Chinde, Chihenne – ‘Red Painted People’, known as Warm Springs Apache Band or Gila Apaches, Eastern Chiricahua)
- Chukunende (Chokonende, Chokonen – ‘Ridge of the Mountainside People’, known as Chiricahua Band, proper or Central Chiricahua)
- Nde’ndai (Ndénai, Nednai, Ndé'ndai – ‘Enemy People’, ‘People who make trouble’, sometimes known as Pinery Apache Band, known as Sierre Madre Apaches, Southern Chiricahua)
- Bidánku (Bedonkohe – ‘In Front of the End People’, Bi-da-a-naka-enda – ‘Standing in front of the enemy’, sometimes known as Bronco Apache Band, known as Mogollon Apaches or Gila Apaches, Northeastern Chiricahua)

The Apache are southern Athabaskan-speaking peoples who migrated many centuries ago from the subarctic to the southwestern region of what would become the United States. The Chiricahua settled in southeastern Arizona, southwestern New Mexico of the present-day United States, northern Sonora, and northern Chihuahua of present-day Mexico. By the late 19th century, the Chiricahua Apache territory encompassed an estimated 15 million acres.

In 1886, to break up the Apache Wars and resistance to European-American settlement, the US federal government took the Chiricahua into custody as prisoners of war and seized their land. The Army forcibly removed 400 members of the tribe from the Fort Apache and San Carlos Reservations in present-day Arizona, and transported them to U.S. Army installations in Alabama and Florida. Some warriors were held at Fort Pickens in Florida. Their ledger drawings are held in a collection by the Smithsonian Institution.

Many of the Apache Scouts who serve in the capture of Geronimo were arrested by the order of General Nelson A. Miles forced on the same train as Geronimo, the Apache Scouts came from the Tonto, Pinal, Aravaipa, Apache Pecks, Chiricahua, San Carlos, and White Mountain Apache bands, some of the Apache Scouts where also Apache chiefs were from different Apache bands.

In 1894, the US Congress passed a special provision to allow the Chiricahua to be relocated to Indian Territory. They were the last Indian tribe to be relocated into what is now Oklahoma. When the Chiricahua arrived at Fort Sill, they had been promised the lands surrounding the fort as theirs to settle. Local non-Indians resisted Apache settlement, and the tribe was pressured to leave. Many wanted to return to their traditional lands in the Southwest, and the Mescalero Apache offered them land on their reservation.

A third of the Chiricahua stayed in Indian Territory, demanding that the US fulfill its promise to give them the Fort Sill lands. As a compromise, the government gave the remaining Chiricahua land which it had classified as surplus after allotment of tribal lands to individual households under the Dawes Act, on the nearby Kiowa-Comanche-Apache Reservation. In 1914, the US government finally released 84 individuals from prisoner status and granted them household allotment lands around Fletcher and Apache, Oklahoma.

The Fort Sill Apache struggled for survival in the ensuing years in the economically depressed areas of southwestern Oklahoma. The tribe seized the opportunity afforded by Oklahoma Indian Welfare Act of 1936. Persevering through the difficulty of satisfying documentation requirements for tribal continuity, they were recognized by the federal government (Department of Interior) as a tribe in 1976.

The first chairperson, elected in 1976, was Mildred Cleghorn, one of the last Chiricahua Apache born under "prisoner of war" status. She was an educator and traditional doll maker who was regarded as a cultural leader among the elders. She served as tribal chairperson until 1995 and focused on sustaining history and traditional Chiricahua culture.

Allan Houser was the first Fort Sill Apache child to be born free. He became one of the most celebrated Native American sculptors of the 20th century. His sons, Bob Haozous and Phillip Haozous, are successful sculptors today and are both enrolled citizens of the tribe.

== Education ==
Like other areas in Luna County, the Fort Sill Apache Indian Reservation is in the Deming Public Schools school district.

== Notable tribal members ==
- Mildred Cleghorn (1910–1997), first chairperson of the tribe, textile artist
- Nancy Marie Mithlo, professor, curator, visual anthropologist
- Bob Haozous (b. 1943), postmodern sculptor
- Allan Houser (1914–1994), modernist sculptor and painter
- Geronimo (1829–1909), tribal leader prior to imprisonment
