= Mildred Cleghorn =

Chiricahua Apache leader, educator, and artist from Oklahoma, U.S.

- Eh-Ohn, Lay-a-Bet

Chair of the Fort Sill Apache Tribe
- In office 1976–1995

Personal details
- Born: Mildred Imoch Cleghorn; December 11, 1910 Fort Sill, Oklahoma, U.S.
- Died: April 15, 1997 (aged 86) Apache, Oklahoma, U.S.
- Citizenship: Fort Sill Apache Tribe of Oklahoma, American
- Children: 1
- Education: Cameron Junior College; Oklahoma Agricultural and Mechanical College

Mildred Imoch Cleghorn (Chiricahua: Eh-Ohn and Lay-a-Bet; December 11, 1910 – April 15, 1997) was a Chiricahua Apache dollmaker, educator, and tribal leader who served as the first chairperson of the Fort Sill Apache Tribe of Oklahoma from 1976 to 1995. She dedicated her life to preserving Apache culture and promoting Native American rights.

== Early life and education ==
Cleghorn was born on December 11, 1910, at Fort Sill, Oklahoma, while her family was still considered prisoners of war by the U.S. federal government. Her grandparents and parents had been imprisoned following the surrender of the Chiricahua Apache leader Geronimo in 1886, first in Florida, then Alabama, and finally at Fort Sill. In 1913, when Cleghorn was three years old, the Chiricahua Apache were officially released from their prisoner-of-war status.

Cleghorn's education began in Apache, Oklahoma, where she completed high school before attending the Haskell Institute. She then attended Cameron Junior College, and later earned a degree in home economics from Oklahoma Agricultural and Mechanical College in 1941.

== Career ==
Cleghorn was a home extension agent and as a home economics teacher. She worked with several Native American communities, including the Mescalero Apache Reservation in New Mexico and various tribes in Oklahoma. She later became a home economics teacher, working at Fort Sill Indian School and Riverside Indian School. In addition to teaching high school students, Cleghorn also worked with kindergarten-aged children at the Apache Public School.

Cleghorn was engaged in promoting traditional Apache history and culture. She created traditional dolls representing the clothing of various Native American tribes she encountered during her teaching career. Cleghorn's dolls were displayed in prominent institutions, including the Smithsonian Folklife Festival in 1967. In 1976, when the Fort Sill Apache Tribe was formally recognized by the U.S. government, Cleghorn became the first chairperson of the tribe. Her tenure as tribal leader, which lasted until 1995, was marked by her commitment to preserving tribal history and promoting economic development for the Apache people. Her contributions to preserving Apache culture and advocating for Native American rights have been recognized through awards, including the Ellis Island Award in 1987 and the Indian of the Year Award in 1989.

On June 10, 1996, Indian plaintiffs including Elouise P. Cobell, Cleghorn, Thomas Maulson and James Louis Larose, filed a class action lawsuit against the U.S. government for its failure to properly manage Indian trust assets on behalf of all present and past individual Indian trust beneficiaries. Cleghorn did not live to see the results of the lawsuit, which became known as Cobell v. Salazar. It was settled for $3.4 billion in 2009, in the Indians' favor, a week after what would have been Cleghorn's 99th birthday.

== Personal life ==
Cleghorn married William G. Cleghorn, whom she met while working in Kansas. The couple had one daughter. Cleghorn remained active in public life well into her later years, traveling extensively and participating in various educational and cultural exchanges. She visited England, other European nations, Mexico, and other international destinations as part of her efforts to promote the rights and welfare of women and Native American communities. Cleghorn died on April 15, 1997, in an automobile accident near her home in Apache, Oklahoma. She was buried at the Fort Still Post Cemetery.
