= Main Interior Building =

- US Department of the Interior Building
- U.S. National Register of Historic Places
- Main Interior Building viewed from the south with the Statue of José Gervasio Artigas in the foreground in 2005

- Location within Central Washington, D.C. Location within the District of Columbia Location within the United States
- Location: 18th and C Sts. NW, Washington, D.C., U.S.
- Coordinates: 38°53′38″N 77°2′33″W
- Area: 5 acres (2.0 ha)
- Built: 1936
- Architect: Waddy Butler Wood, et al.
- NRHP reference No.: 86002898
- Added to NRHP: November 10, 1986

The Main Interior Building, officially known as the Stewart Lee Udall Department of the Interior Building, located in Washington, D.C., is the headquarters of the United States Department of the Interior.

Located in the Foggy Bottom neighborhood, it is bounded by 19th Street NW on the west, 18th Street NW on the east, E Street NW on the north, C Street NW on the south, and Virginia Avenue on the southwest. Although the building takes up the entire block, the address is "1849 C Street, NW" to commemorate the founding of the Department of Interior in 1849. To the east is DAR Constitution Hall, the headquarters of the Daughters of the American Revolution, as well as the World Resources Institute and the American Red Cross National Headquarters. To the west is the Office of Personnel Management headquarters. To the north is Rawlins Park, which includes at its eastern end a statue of Major General John A. Rawlins, and Triangle Park is to the south.

The building includes offices of the secretary of the interior and major bureaus with their employees. It includes the Interior Museum and Interior Library.

== History ==
From 1852 to 1917, the Interior Department was headquartered in the Patent Office building, which today houses the National Portrait Gallery and the Smithsonian American Art Museum of the Smithsonian Institution. From 1917 until the completion of the Main Interior Building, the Interior Department was housed in what is now the U.S. General Services Administration Building, between E and F Streets and 18th and 19th Streets NW.

By the time President Franklin D. Roosevelt took office, the Department of the Interior had outgrown its headquarters, and satellite offices in 15 additional rented offices in Washington left employees scattered across the city and overcrowded. Plans for a new headquarters were undertaken by Roosevelt's Secretary of the Interior, Harold L. Ickes. Sworn in on March 4, 1933, immediately after the Roosevelt administration took office, Ickes received permission from President Roosevelt to take over the soon-to-be finished Interstate Commerce Building in the Federal Triangle area, but this plan was difficult because it required an act of Congress. As an alternative, Roosevelt recommended that funds be appropriated for a new building specifically for the Department. In 1934 Ickes - who as Administrator of Public Works led the Public Works Administration in addition to his position of Secretary - allotted $12.74 million, with the approval of the President, for a new Interior building.

Three sites were considered for the Interior Building: One on the National Mall facing Constitution Avenue between 12th and 14th Streets NW, the current site of the National Museum of American History; another on a cluster of small lots on the east, west, and north sides of the old Interior Building; and a third just south of the old Interior building and Rawlins Park in the Foggy Bottom neighborhood. On March 21, 1934, the third proposed site was selected. The plot including the area between 18th and 19th Streets and C and E Streets NW and was one of the few double-block sites in the city where an intervening street (D Street) could be eliminated for development.

Waddy Butler Wood was selected as the architect to design the new Interior Building. Secretary Ickes was deeply involved in the design of the new building, and the January 9, 1937 edition of the Washington Daily News stated that "Secretary Ickes has a paternal concern for the new Interior Building. He designed most of it himself, and financed it through PWA." Ickes did not design the building, but many of its features were a result of his influence in the planning, design, and construction stages.

The building design was directed as utility and economy. Significant aspects include wide central corridors, open courtyards, movable steel office partitions, acoustically treated ceilings, a floor reserved for mechanical equipment, and fireproofing. Ickes had air conditioning installed in his office in the Old Interior Building and insisted that central air condition be included throughout the new building so that all employees could enjoy it, the first such system in a large government building. Melding aspects of practicality and aesthetics, the Main Interior Building became "one of the most functional and innovative government office structures in Washington" in the 1930s. Ickes reported in a Cabinet meeting that the Interior Building cost 10 to 15 percent less to operate than the buildings in the Federal Triangle even with air conditioning, and cost less per square foot. Ickes also ensured that group assembly space and employee amenities were added to the building, including the Conference Hall (Auditorium), the Activity Space (Gymnasium), the Cafeteria with courtyard, the Employees Lounge (South Penthouse, now offices) with soda fountain, the Interior Museum, the Art Gallery (currently used for offices), the Indian Arts and Crafts Shop, the Broadcasting Studio (North Penthouse), and the parking garage.

Systems for maintainable, efficiency, and fire protection were also included in the design. These included a central vacuum system, a floor between the fifth and sixth floors for mechanical equipment (including plumbing, electrical panels, telephone equipment, and air conditioning) and fire and security systems (automatic sprinklers in the parking garage and storage areas, a fire detection system on the mechanical floor, and 11 stairways for rapid evacuation).

Despite the emphasis on functionalism of the building, art and architecture are also featured. Decorative detailing such as bronze grilles and hardware, the light fixtures, and plaster moldings, "reflecting the architect's and his client's concern for design materials and craftsmanship." Some architectural details feature Interior Department symbols, including a buffalo motif on doors. The building contains more Public Work Administration artwork than any other government building and includes the work of the second-highest number of PWA artists, more than any except the Franklin Street Post Office Station in Washington.

As in other aspects of the building design, Ickes was involved in every step of the artwork:

The Secretary reviewed preliminary sketches and often provided valuable critiques. He inspected all full-size mural cartoons taped on walls and frequently requested changes, especially the content of the message in the mural. He saw each work of art as a medium to expound upon the administration's philosophy of conservation or to portray one of the programs of the Interior Department. He inspected murals painted in the building daily (some were painted in studios and brought to the buildings for installation). No mural was complete until Ickes approved it.

In Ickes' official portrait, the plans for the Main Interior Building are shown lying on the table in front of him.

Construction of Main Interior began in April 1935 and was completed in December 1936. The building was the first New Deal building in the capital- authorized, designed, and built by the Roosevelt administration. It was notable for the speed of the project, with construction completed in 18 months. The Interior Museum described the double city-block building as "monumental...Its colossal pilasters and pillars emphasize monumental scale rather than relate the size of the building to the individual. It was meant to emphasize a new "heroic age of government," and "every aspect of the building tells this story."

At the dedication ceremony held on April 16, 1936, President Roosevelt referred to the building as "symbolical of the Nation's vast resources" and the "cornerstone of a conservation policy that will guarantee the richness of their heritage", while Ickes saw it as a "symbol of a new day."

=== Renaming of Main Interior Building ===
In 2010, the United States Congress passed legislation designating the Main Interior Building in Washington as the "Stewart Lee Udall Department of the Interior Building.", in honor of his contributions. The bill was signed into law on 8 June 2010. Stewart Lee Udall served as Secretary of the Interior for eight years (1961–1969). Stewart Udall died in March, 2010 at the age of 90.

== Tenants ==
- Bureau of Indian Affairs (BIA)
- Bureau of Indian Education (BIE)

== Indigenous Peoples Arts and Crafts Shop ==
Ickes wanted to promote Native American art, as the Bureau of Indian Affairs was included in the cabinet department. The building was designed to include a shop in which arts and crafts by living Native American artists would be sold. Today, the Indigenous Peoples Craft Shop on the first floor continues to include work by Native American artists. Three murals in the shop were completed by PWA artists. Breaking Camp at Wartime and Buffalo Hunt by Allan Houser depict the Apache. Deer Stalking by Gerald Nailor depicts Navajohunters creating sandpainting.

== Murals ==
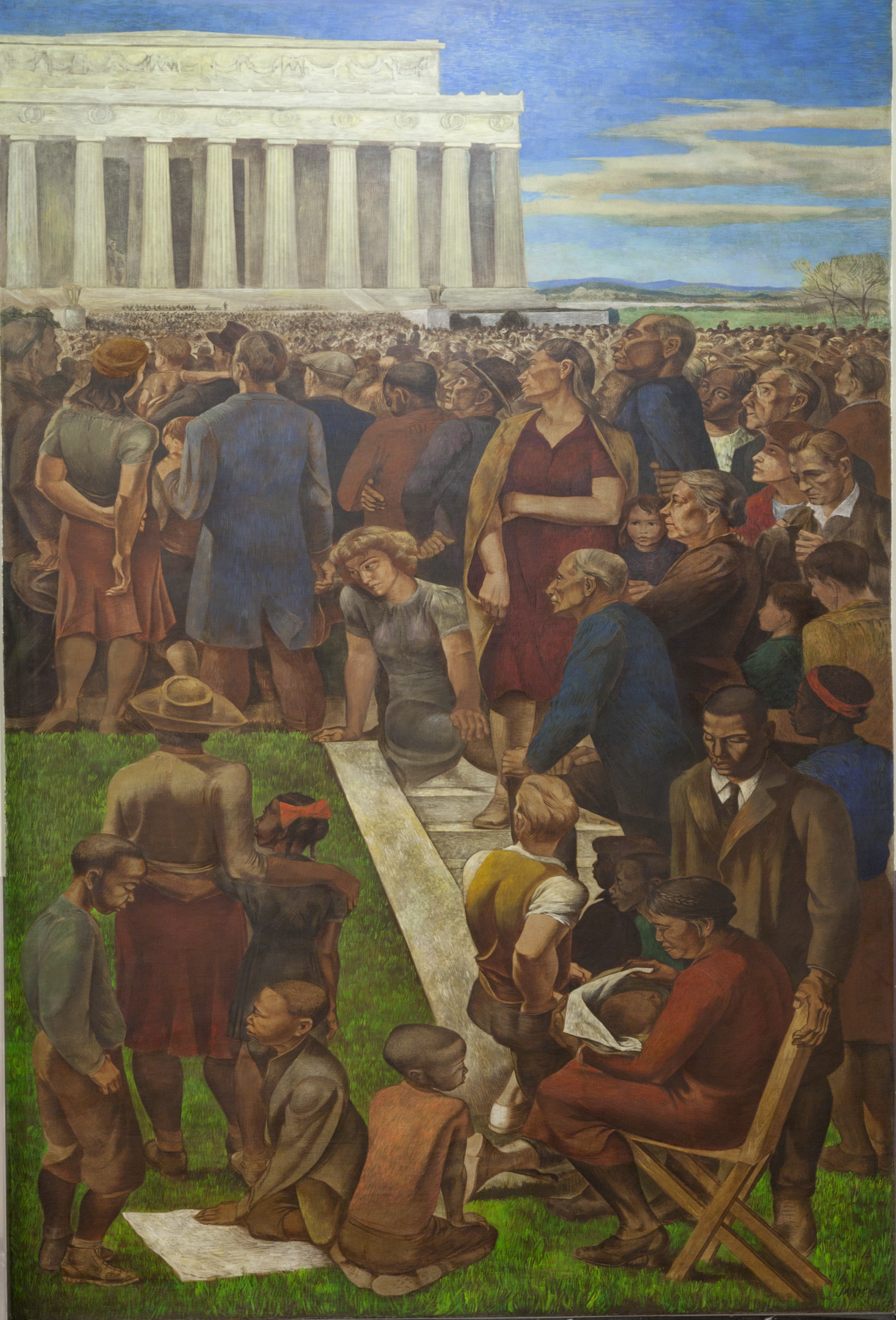
Mitchell Jamieson's mural An Incident in Contemporary American Life (1943), at the United States Department of the Interior Building, depicts Marian Anderson's 1939 concert at the Lincoln Memorial.

Other murals in the building are by Maynard Dixon, Gifford Beal, and William Gropper. Among them:

- An Incident in Contemporary American Life, Mitchell Jamieson, tempera on canvas, commissioned 1940, installed 1942. This depicts Marian Anderson's 1939 concert at the Lincoln Memorial after the Daughters of the American Revolution refused to allow an integrated concert to be held at Constitution Hall. Secretary Ickes offered the use of the Lincoln Memorial for her concert.
- The Negro's Contribution in the Social and Cultural Development of America, Millard Sheets, oil on canvas, commissioned 1939, installed 1948. This series of four murals depicts African-American influence on America in the areas of Education, the Arts, Religion, and Science.
- Indian and Soldier, Maynard Dixon, oil on canvas, commissioned 1937, installed 1939. This represents the Bureau of Indian Affairs and "symbolizes the transition of the Indian from warrior to farmer and the immense loss of Indian culture involved." The thickening clouds and disappearing buffalo signify the end of traditional life. The empty space evokes the vastness of the West.
- Rush for the Oklahoma Land of 1894, John Steuart Curry, oil on canvas, commissioned 1937, installed 1939. This mural depicts an Oklahoma land run. It "captures the seconds after the great gunshot that launched the Oklahoma land rush. It is pure emotion in motion."
- Construction of a Dam, William Gropper, oil on canvas, commissioned 1937, installed 1939. This mural, which the Interior Museum states is the building's most reproduced, "glorifies not just public works projects, but work itself," showing the "drama, dignity, and strength of labor."
- Ansel Adams: Mural Project 1941–1942 was installed in March 2010 after lying dormant for almost 70 years. Then-Secretary Ickes commissioned Adams to produce large-format photographs to convey not only the beauty and grandeur of the natural scene, but to show Interior managed resources, conservation, sound direction and stewardship of those resources. The project was halted in 1942 due to the US entrance into World War II. At that time, Adams had made more than 200 images during a trek that began in Yosemite National Park. He photographed more than just nature, portraying Boulder Dam, at the time the world's largest. A special part of Adams’ assignment was to show Natives American life and culture. Ansel Adams: The Mural Project 1941–1942 features 26 giclee canvas murals of some of the most iconic sites of the American West, including Grand Teton, Grand Canyon and Glacier National Parks.

== Gallery ==
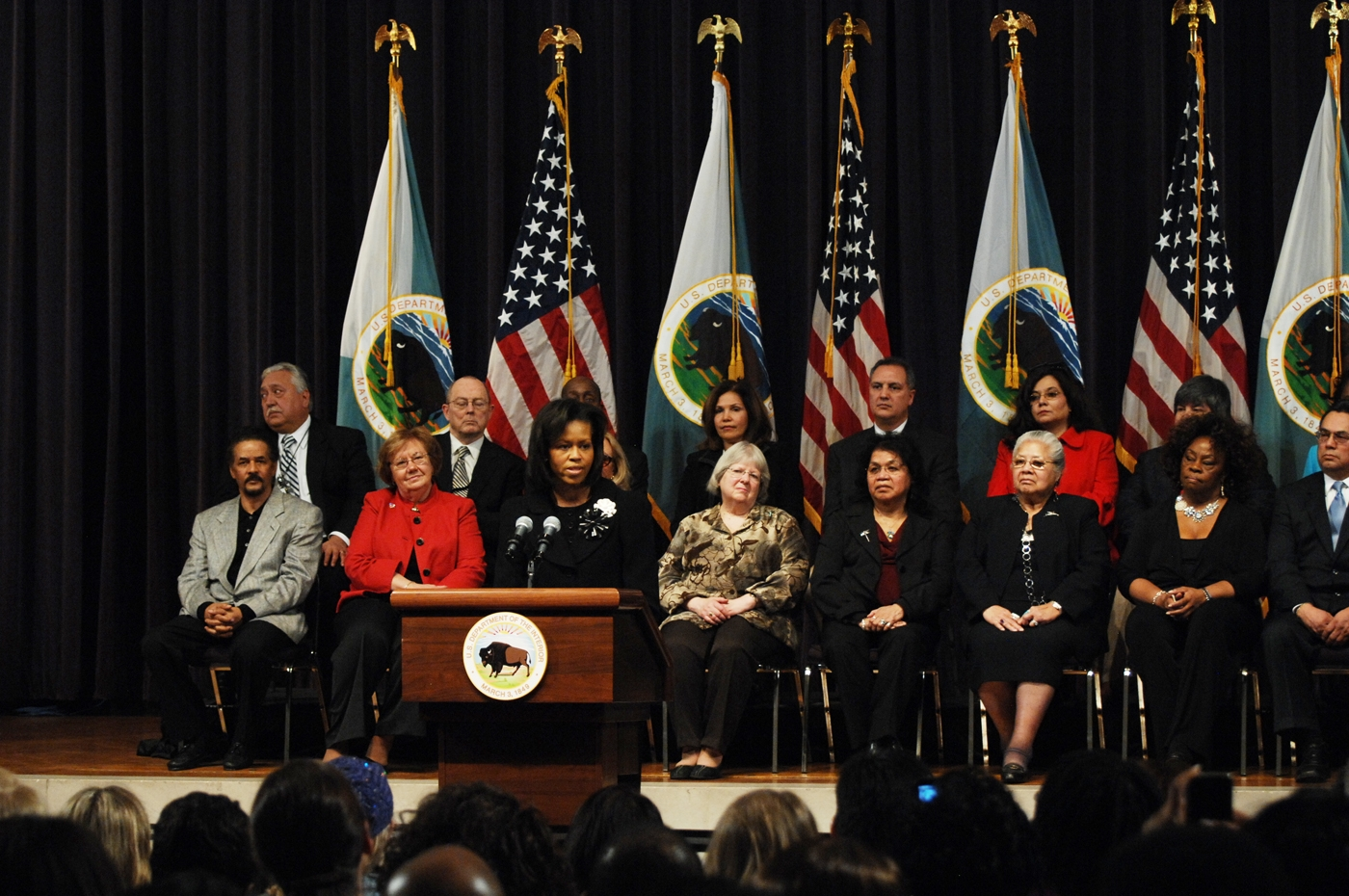
First Lady Michelle Obama and Secretary of the Interior Ken Salazar, joined by some of the department's longest-serving employees on stage, thanked all employees for their service at a ceremony at Sidney R. Yates Auditorium at Main Interior.

== See also ==
- Interior Museum
