= Apache, Oklahoma =

Town in Oklahoma, US

- Town
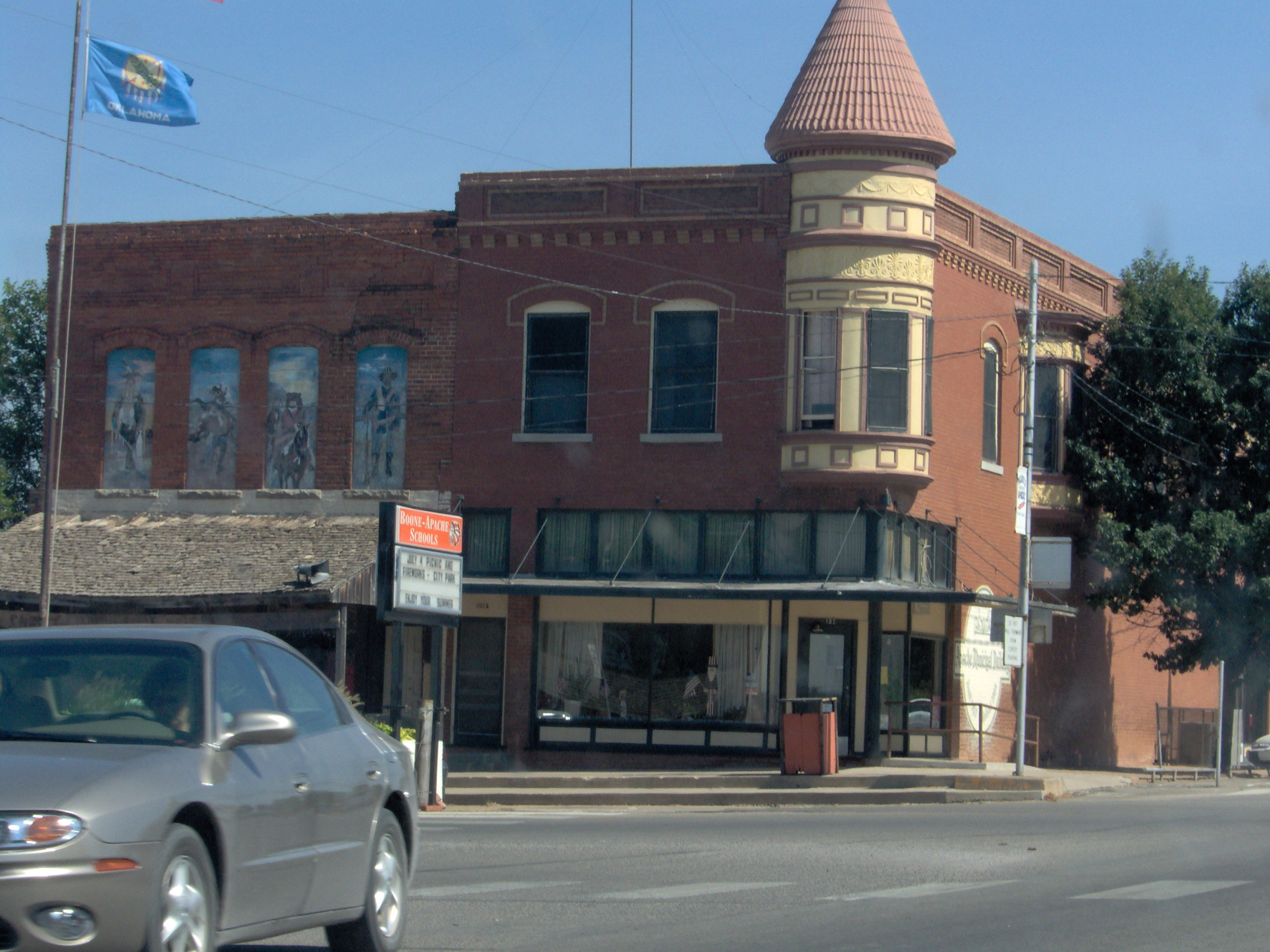
- Amphlett Brothers Drug and Jewelry Store in Apache

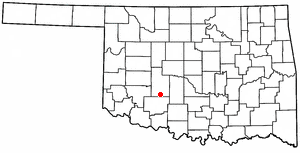
- Location of Apache, Oklahoma
- Coordinates: 34°53′39″N 98°21′31″W
- Country: United States
- State: Oklahoma
- County: Caddo

Area
  - Total: 2.16 sq mi (5.59 km^{2})
  - Land: 2.15 sq mi (5.56 km^{2})
  - Water: 0.012 sq mi (0.03 km^{2})
- Elevation: 1,286 ft (392 m)

Population (2020)
  - Total: 1,034
  - Density: 482.1/sq mi (186.13/km^{2})
- Time zone: UTC-6 (Central (CST))
  - Summer (DST): UTC-5 (CDT)
- ZIP code: 73006
- Area code: 580
- FIPS code: 40-02300
- GNIS feature ID: 2412371

Apache is a town in Caddo County, Oklahoma, United States. As of the 2020 census, Apache had a population of 1,034.

== History ==
Before opening the Kiowa, Comanche, and Apache Reservation on August 1, 1901, for unrestricted settlement by non-Indians, Land Lottery Director William A. Richards had recommended setting aside the land now occupied by Apache as a townsite. He had expected the community would be named "Richards" in his honor. Instead, officials of the Chicago, Rock Island and Pacific Railway (Rock Island) named the community Apache. A land run for lots in Apache was held on August 6, 1901, which was the last land run in Oklahoma. According to the Encyclopedia of Oklahoma History and Culture, five lumberyards and six saloons opened for business within hours after the run. A tent served as a market for groceries.

An election of the town's first city officials was held in an outdoor meeting on the evening of August 6, 1901. E. E. Blake was elected as mayor and F. E. Richey as city clerk. Appointed officials included I. F. Crow, city attorney, and Sam Wass, city marshal. Apache was incorporated on July 22, 1902.

== Geography ==
Apache is located 23 miles (37 km) north of Lawton.

According to the United States Census Bureau, the town has a total area of 2.0 square miles (5.2 km^{2}), of which, 2.0 square miles (5.2 km^{2}) is land and 0.49% is water.

=== Climate ===
Climate data for Apache, Oklahoma
Month	Jan	Feb	Mar	Apr	May	Jun	Jul	Aug	Sep	Oct	Nov	Dec	Year
Mean daily maximum °F (°C)	49.7 (9.8)	55.2 (12.9)	65.3 (18.5)	74.8 (23.8)	82 (28)	89.8 (32.1)	96.1 (35.6)	94.9 (34.9)	86.4 (30.2)	76.3 (24.6)	62.6 (17.0)	52.2 (11.2)	73.8 (23.2)
Mean daily minimum °F (°C)	26.5 (−3.1)	30.7 (−0.7)	39.5 (4.2)	49.1 (9.5)	57.8 (14.3)	65.9 (18.8)	70.2 (21.2)	69.2 (20.7)	61.8 (16.6)	50.7 (10.4)	39.5 (4.2)	29.8 (−1.2)	49.2 (9.6)
Average precipitation inches (mm)	1.1 (28)	1.4 (36)	2.4 (61)	2.6 (66)	5 (130)	3.9 (99)	2 (51)	2.4 (61)	3.8 (97)	2.8 (71)	1.8 (46)	1.2 (30)	30.4 (770)
Source: Weatherbase.com

== Demographics ==
Historical population
Census	Pop.	Note	%±
1910	950		—
1920	919		−3.3%
1930	1,302		41.7%
1940	1,047		−19.6%
1950	1,190		13.7%
1960	1,455		22.3%
1970	1,421		−2.3%
1980	1,560		9.8%
1990	1,591		2.0%
2000	1,616		1.6%
2010	1,444		−10.6%
2020	1,034		−28.4%
U.S. Decennial Census

=== 2020 census ===
As of the 2020 census, Apache had a population of 1,034. The median age was 42.9 years. 22.5% of residents were under the age of 18 and 22.0% of residents were 65 years of age or older. For every 100 females there were 88.3 males, and for every 100 females age 18 and over there were 83.7 males age 18 and over.

0.0% of residents lived in urban areas, while 100.0% lived in rural areas.

There were 447 households in Apache, of which 26.0% had children under the age of 18 living in them. Of all households, 38.9% were married-couple households, 17.9% were households with a male householder and no spouse or partner present, and 37.4% were households with a female householder and no spouse or partner present. About 37.6% of all households were made up of individuals and 21.1% had someone living alone who was 65 years of age or older.

There were 517 housing units, of which 13.5% were vacant. The homeowner vacancy rate was 2.7% and the rental vacancy rate was 11.4%.

Racial composition as of the 2020 census
Race	Number	Percent
White	640	61.9%
Black or African American	11	1.1%
American Indian and Alaska Native	281	27.2%
Asian	0	0.0%
Native Hawaiian and Other Pacific Islander	2	0.2%
Some other race	6	0.6%
Two or more races	94	9.1%
Hispanic or Latino (of any race)	52	5.0%

=== 2010 census ===
As of the census of 2010, there were 1,444 people living in the town. The population density was 799.0 inhabitants per square mile (308.5/km^{2}). There were 712 housing units at an average density of 352.0 per square mile (135.9/km^{2}). The racial makeup of the town was 70.79% White, 0.12% African American, 25.12% Native American, 0.25% Asian, 0.06% Pacific Islander, 0.56% from other races, and 3.09% from two or more races. Hispanic or Latino people of any race were 3.47% of the population.

There were 646 households, out of which 35.6% had children under the age of 18 living with them, 48.8% were married couples living together, 15.0% had a female householder with no husband present, and 31.1% were non-families. 27.6% of all households were made up of individuals, and 15.2% had someone living alone who was 65 years of age or older. The average household size was 2.50 and the average family size was 3.06.

In the town, the population was spread out, with 29.6% under the age of 18, 9.2% from 18 to 24, 26.1% from 25 to 44, 19.4% from 45 to 64, and 15.7% who were 65 years of age or older. The median age was 34 years. For every 100 females, there were 89.2 males. For every 100 females age 18 and over, there were 84.7 males.

The median income for a household in the town was $26,953, and the median income for a family was $32,431. Males had a median income of $25,391 versus $19,853 for females. The per capita income for the town was $12,790. About 11.4% of families and 16.2% of the population were below the poverty line, including 22.4% of those under age 18 and 9.8% of those age 65 or over.

== Economy ==
Apache began as an agricultural center, with wheat and cattle as the primary products, and remains that to the present.

== Utilities ==
- Apache Public Works Authority provides water, sewer, and sanitation services to the town.
- Electric service is provided by American Electric Power Public Service Company of Oklahoma or CKEnergy Electric Cooperative.
- Natural Gas service is provided by Oklahoma Natural Gas.
- Digital telephone service, and DSL internet is provided by Pioneer Telephone.
- Digital Cable TV service is provided by Southern Plains Cable Company.

== Notable people ==
- Clara Archilta (1912–1994), watercolor painter and beadworker
- Mildred Cleghorn (1910–1997), dollmaker and Apache cultural leader
- Lou Kretlow (1921–2007), Major League Baseball pitcher
- Pascal Poolaw (1922–1967), Native American war hero
