= Black-on-black ware =

Type of Native American pottery

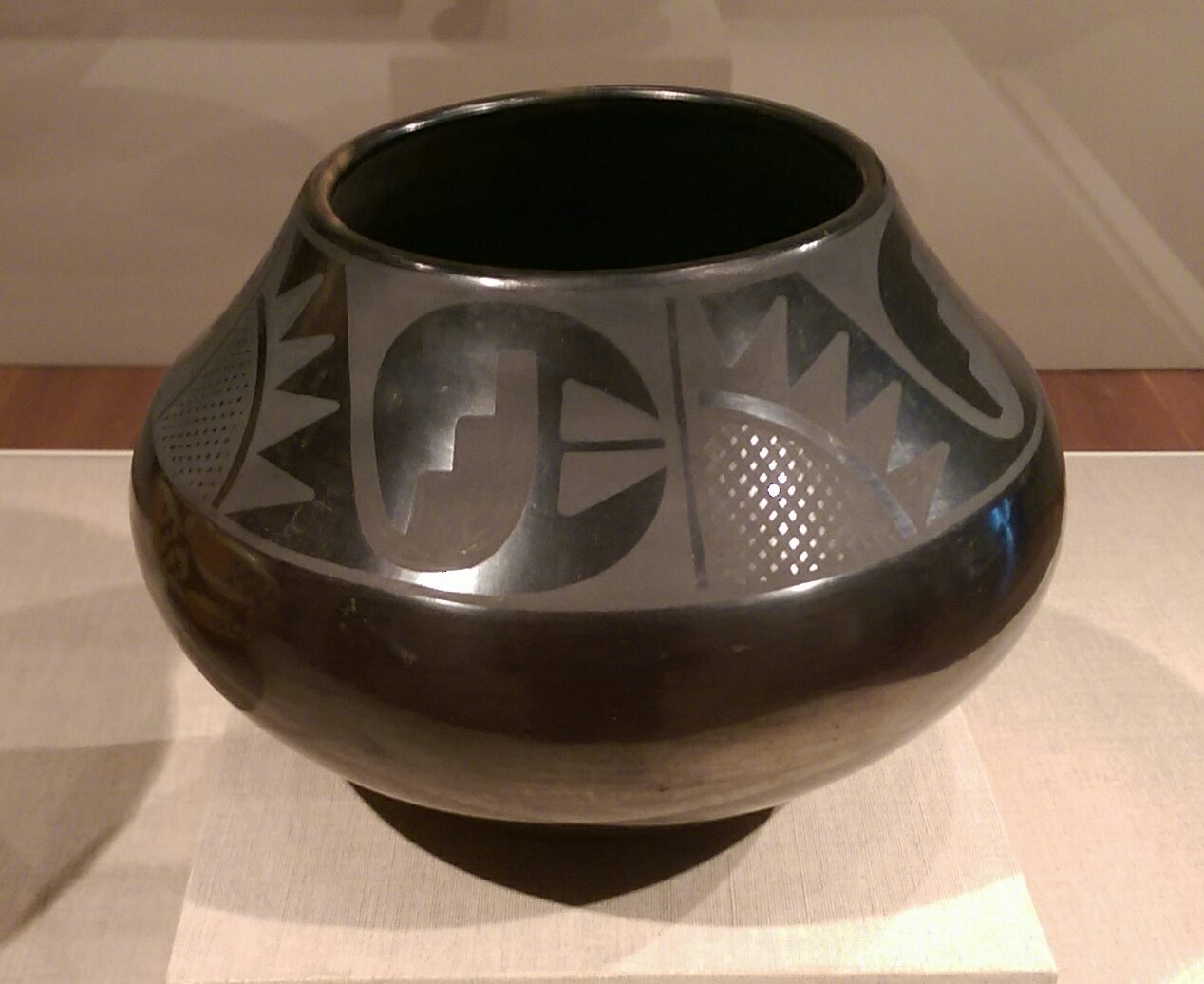
Black-on-black ware pot by María Martinez of San Ildefonso Pueblo, circa 1945. Collection deYoung Museum

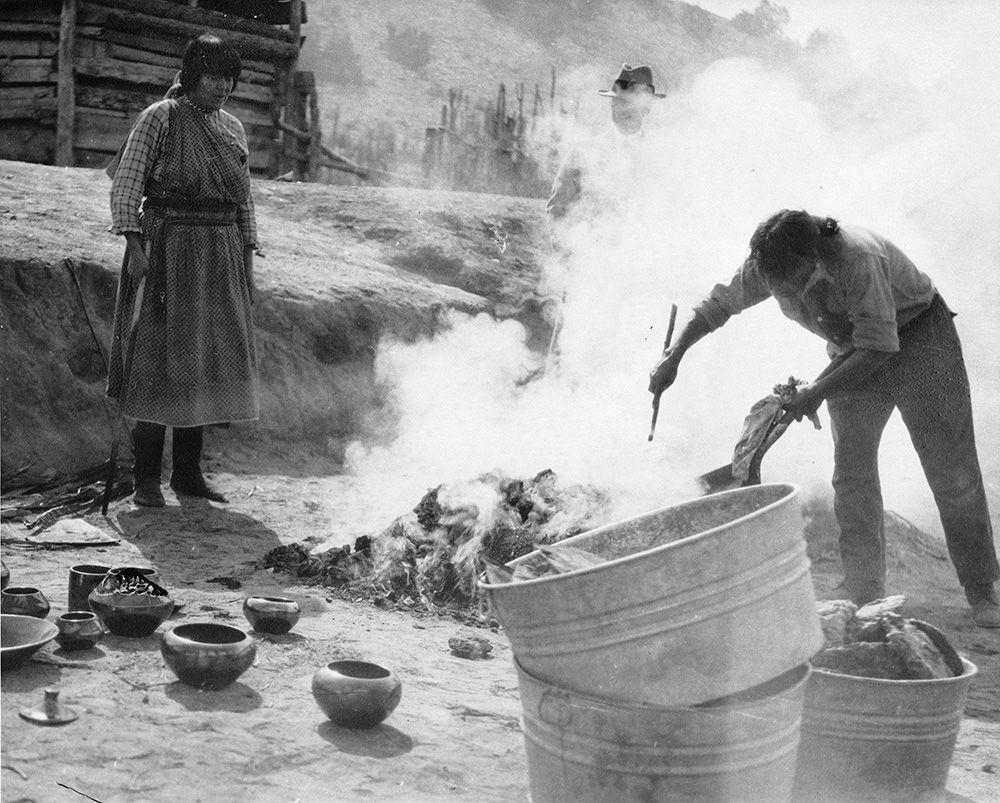
María and Julián Martinez pit firing black-on-black ware pottery at P'ohwhóge Owingeh (San Ildefonso Pueblo), New Mexico (c.1920)

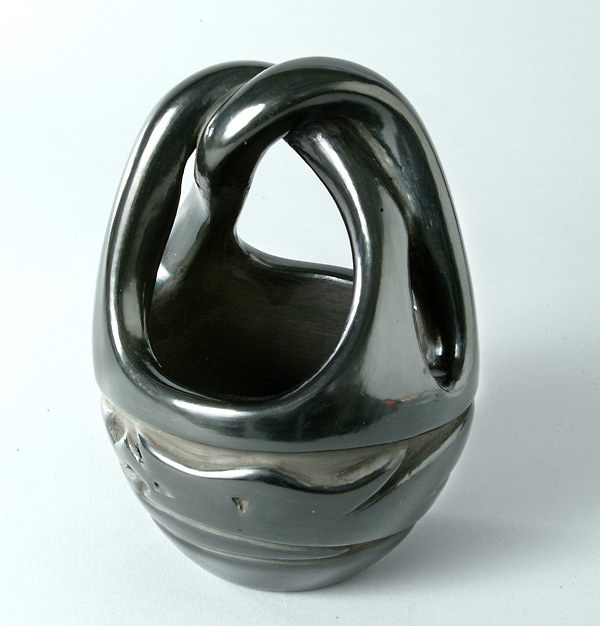
Incised black-on-black Awanyu pot by Florence Browning of Santa Clara Pueblo, collection Bandelier National Monument

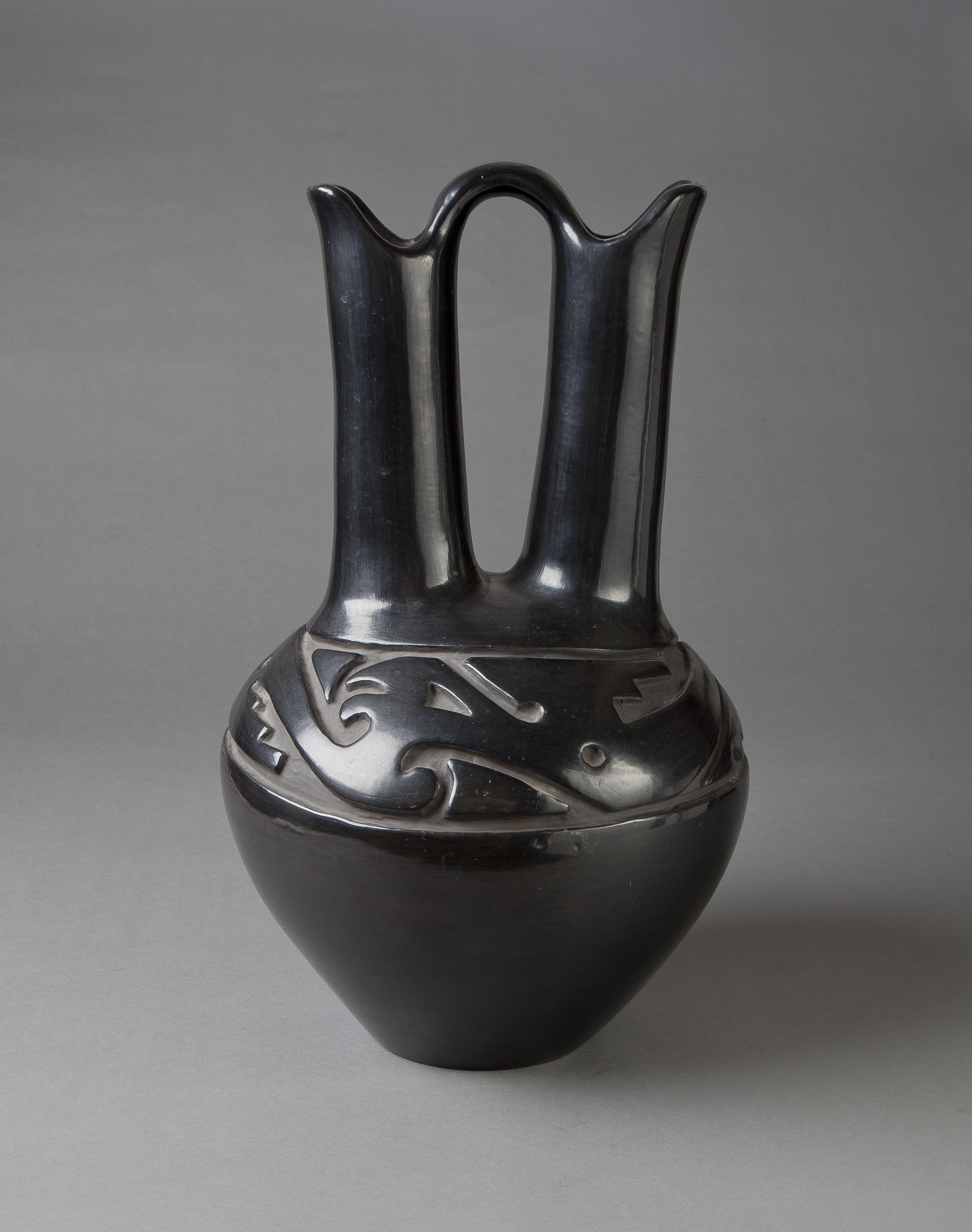
Wedding Vase, c. 1970, Margaret Tafoya of Santa Clara Pueblo, collection Bowers Museum

Black-on-black ware is a 20th and 21st-century pottery tradition developed by Puebloan Native American ceramic artists in Northern New Mexico. Traditional reduction-fired blackware has been made for centuries by Pueblo artists and other artists around the world. Pueblo black-on-black ware of the past century is produced with a smooth surface, with the designs applied through selective burnishing or the application of refractory slip. Another style involves carving or incising designs and selectively polishing the raised areas. For generations several families from Kha'po Owingeh and P'ohwhóge Owingeh pueblos have been making black-on-black ware with the techniques passed down from matriarch potters. Artists from other pueblos have also produced black-on-black ware. Several contemporary artists have created works honoring the pottery of their ancestors.

== Blackware and black-on-black ware ==
The artists of Kha'po Owingeh (Tewa: [xɑ̀ʔp’òː ʔówîŋgè]), also called Santa Clara Pueblo, and of P'ohwhóge Owingeh (Tewa: [p’òhxʷógè ʔówîŋgè]), also known as San Ildefonso Pueblo, have been making traditional blackware (reduction-fired earthenware) for many years using a coarse-grained clay body decorated with deeply incised or excised designs. During the firing process in an earthen pit, the fire is smothered with powdered dung which reduces the oxygen without diminishing the heat; this process blackens the clay. Another method of blackening the clay is by "smudging". The pots are surrounded with sheets of metal to reduce the amount of oxygen, and then smothered with damp manure. The smoke impregnates the clay with carbon to produce the blackened finish.

Black-on-black ware is produced with a smooth surface, with the designs applied through selective burnishing or the application of refractory slip. The clay body used in this type of pottery has a very fine grain structure. Both types are typically made using traditional methods of hand-coiling local clay and firing it in a pit. Black-on-black ware pottery can be found in many museums and private collections. The rapid shift in the early 20th century from traditional blackware made for centuries to the black-on-black style that broke with tradition was triggered by the innovations of María Martinez of P'ohwhóge Owingeh.

== Work by P'ohwhóge Owingeh (San Ildefonso Pueblo) artists ==
In 1910, María Poveka Martinez and her husband Julián of P'ohwhóge Owingeh are credited with originating a non-incised, smooth-surfaced polished-black on matte-black technique. Their technique involves making blackware using a fine-grained clay body fired in a cow-dung fire. By 1918 they had perfected the technique producing black-on-black surface ornamentation, created by selectively burnishing and polishing specific areas of the pot. The polishing gives the clay a silver-black lustrous light-reflecting quality. At times the matte areas are painted with an iron-bearing slip. By 1925, Martinez' pots were in demand, and selling for prices that benefited the pueblo by enabling new houses to be built and farming equipment to be purchased.

Between 1956 and 1970 Martinez collaborated with her son, Popovi Da (1921–1971). Popovi Da was known for his experimentation, precision of design and for reviving and transforming traditional techniques. He perfected gunmetal-black finishes by knowing exactly when to "cut the oxidation" during the firing process. His son, Tony Da (1940–2008) produced work that used sgraffito etching, and initiated a technique to selective black-on-black and sienna coloration on the same vessel. He was able to achieve a "shimmering" mirror-like gunmetal-black finish on his work.

A member of María Martinez' extended family, Santana Roybal Martinez (1909-2002) whose parents were also potters, learned from Maria and Julian Martinez and would sign her pots "Marie and Santana". She was married to Maria and Julian's eldest son Adam Martinez. In 1943, when Julian died, Santana took over the task of polishing and decorating Maria's work. When Maria became too old to fire her pots herself, Santana took on that process. Santana and Adam Martinez became well-known artists in their own right, and their work can be found in numerous private and public collections.

Carmelita Vigil Dunlap (born 1925), was raised by her aunts Maria Martinez and Desideria Martinez. She began producing black-on-black ware in the 1950s as well as other styles of pottery. Other members of the Martinez family and extended family also work in the burnished black-on-black style including three daughters of Carmelita Vigil Dunlap: Linda Dunlap (born 1955), Jeannie Mountain Flower Dunlap (born 1953), Cynthia Star Flower Dunlap (born 1959), as well as Carmelita's niece Martha Apple Leaf Fender (born 1950).

Rose Cata Gonzales (1900–1989) was known for her polished blackware as well as black-on-black pottery, and is credited for innovating a deeply carved style in the 1930s. While she was born at Ohkay Owingeh (San Juan Pueblo), she married into the San Ildefonso Pueblo. She and her son Tse-Pé (born 1940) would sometimes collaborate on works. Tse-pé and his wife Jennifer have worked collaboratively for years gathering and cleaning clay, making, polishing and firing pots.

Barbara Gonzales produces inventive blackware that is incised with delicate parallel-line work revealing an underlayer of red clay to produce a modified black-on-black appearance. She often inlays these pots with semiprecious stones and coral.

Crucita Gonzalez Calabaza (Blue Corn) (1920–1999) was influenced by Maria Martinez, having watched her work on the pueblo. She is known for her polychrome work as well as her black-on-black work.

== Work by Kha'po Owingeh (Santa Clara Pueblo) artists ==
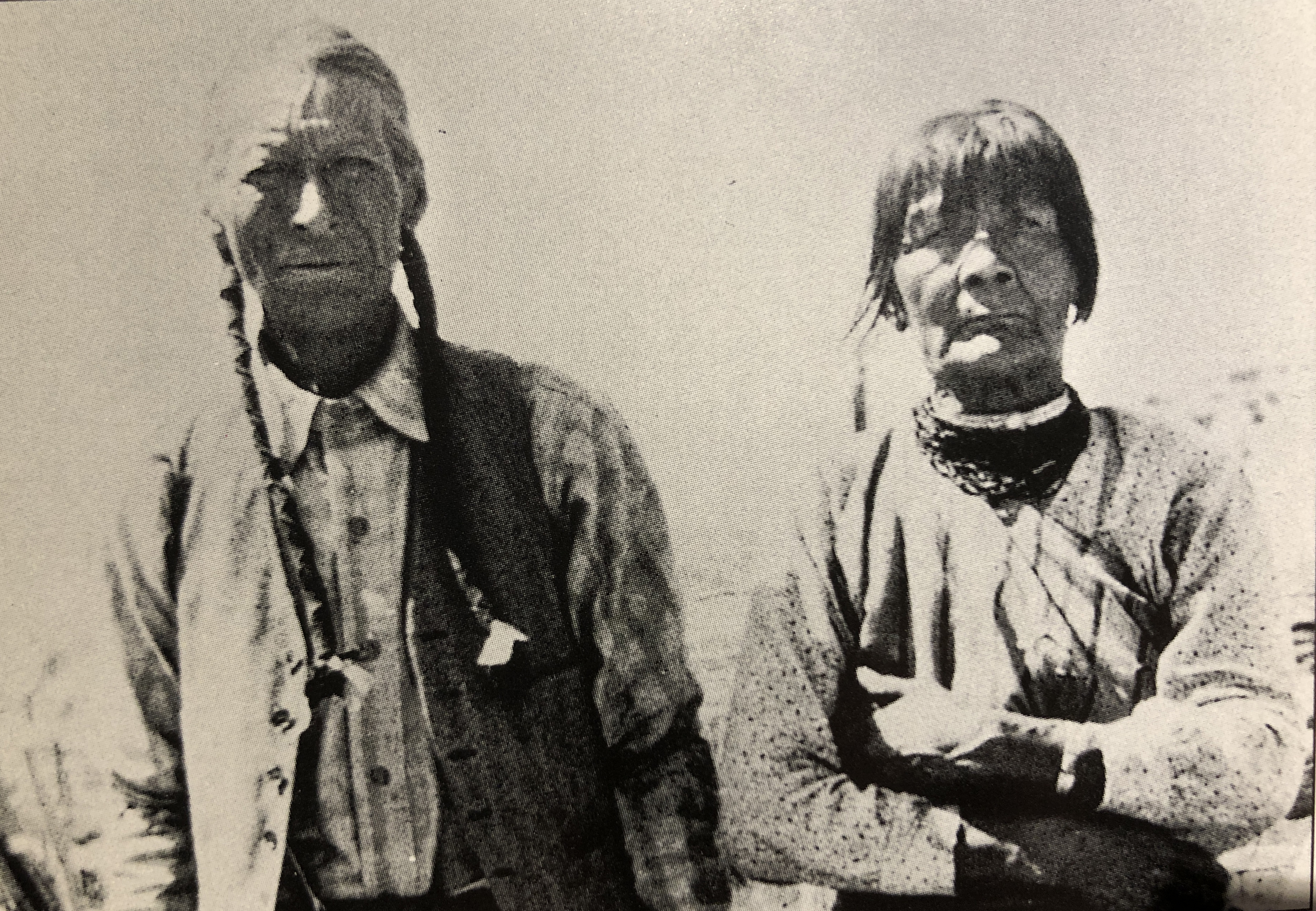
Geronimo (White Flower) and Sara Fina (Autumn Leaf) Tafoya, c. 1900

Five generations of potters of the Tafoya family of Kha'po Owingeh have been producing incised blackware and later, smooth-surfaced black-on-black ware, notably the matriarch potter Sara Fina Tafoya 1863–1949). Both Sara Fina (Autumn Flower) and her husband Geronimo (White Flower) produced polished blackware, however it was Sara Fina who expected nothing but "perfection from her children in their ceramic endeavors", while Geronimo was primarily concerned with cultivating food for the family. She was considered the "outstanding Tewa potter of her time" in relation to the beauty, size, and variety of her ceramic work. Some of her work was produced in micaceous clay, but it was making polished blackware, and later carved black-on-black ware where she excelled.

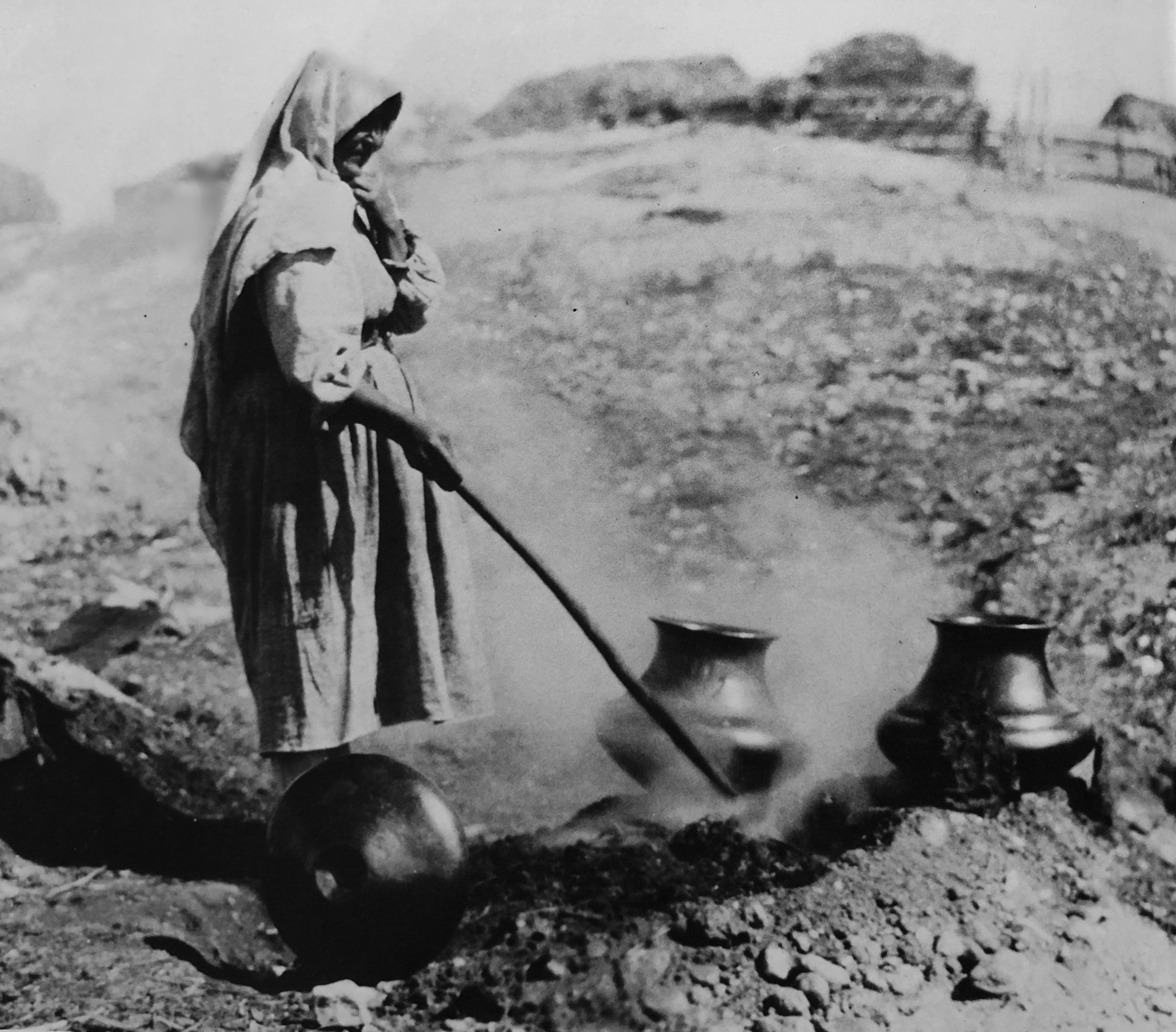
Sara Fina Tafoya (Autumn Leaf) pit-firing blackware pottery at Santa Clara Pueblo, c. 1900

From a series of twelve pots by Sara Fina Tafoya, one of the earliest pots made at Santa Clara Pueblo with a carved Avanyu design, c. 1900-1910. Denver Art Museum

Margaret Tafoya in 1956 with large blackware pot and black-on-black ware in foreground

Sara Fina's daughter Margaret Tafoya (Corn Blossom), born 1904, and her granddaughter LuAnn Tafoya (born 1938) also create black-on-black work. LuAnn learned polishing techniques from her mother starting at age twelve, before she learned to make her own pots. Once she began making her own pots, she challenged her abilities by working at a large scale; her first storage pot was 23 inches tall. She learned from her family the importance of keeping true to tradition working with specific designs and their meanings, digging local clay and open-flame firing techniques.

Another daughter of Sara Fina Tafoya, Christina (Tafoya) Naranjo (1891–1980) is also well known for her blackware, as is her granddaughter Mary Cain (1915–2010), great-granddaughter Linda Cain (born 1949) and her great-great-granddaughter Tammy Garcia (born 1969). Garcia cites the women artists in her family as her role models from whom she learned everything from digging and cleaning and tempering clay to building pots, ornamentation, and firing techniques. Her geometric surface design sensibility is inspired by Mimbres, Acoma and Zuni pottery.

You can look at pottery, like Mimbres or the ancient Puebloan pieces and see there's a story there. Their history wasn't recorded in books – they designed it on their vessels...detailing everything from different plants and animals in the area to cultural events and local stories. – Tammy Garcia

Nathan Youngblood (born 1954), a great-grandson of Sara Fina Tafoya, produces carved black-on-black ware in addition to other styles of ceramic art inspired by his grandmother, Margaret Tafoya. He lived with his grandparents for a while, and there he learned the symbolism behind designs from this grandfather, Alcario Tafoya, and also how and where to dig clay. He assisted his grandmother with the polishing process and learned about different clay bodies and firing techniques from her. Youngblood considers the design process itself as essential to "conveying his message using the symbols of a prayer."

Nancy Youngblood (born 1955) is mainly known for her deeply carved, ribbed sculptural vessels in blackware and redware, however she also produces some black-on-black ware. Her son, Christopher Youngblood (born 1989) is an emerging artist who is a great-great-grandson of Sara Fina Tafoya, great-grandson of Margaret Tafoya. He learned the craft alongside his mother and credits her as his "best teacher" because her expectations were so high. His highly polished, precisely carved black-on-black ware often features images of birds, koi and serpents. Because of his labor-intensive process he only makes a few pieces per year.

Toni Roller (born 1935) is a granddaughter of Sara Fina Tafoya has been a guardian of the Santa Clara cultural traditions throughout her life as an artist. Her son, Jeff Roller and grandsons Ryan Roller and Jordan Roller, all of whom are potters have been inspired by her work. She taught them to "start from scratch and do it the old way". Another granddaughter of Sara Fina Tafoya, Mida Tafoya (born 1931), and her daughter, Sherry Tafoya (born 1956) produce black-on-black ware. Sara Fina Tafoya's son, Camillo Sunflower Tafoya (1902–1905) of Kha'po Owingeh is known for his carved blackware vessels. His daughter, Grace Medicine Flower is known for her miniature pottery. She experiments with mixing different clay bodies and combining black-on-black and redware techniques in the same pot. Virginia Tafoya Ebelacker, a daughter of Margaret Tafoya produced traditional black-on-black ware until about 1951 when she began introducing her jewelry-making skills into her ceramic work. She developed an innovative style of inlaying silver and turquoise elements into her ceramic work. Autumn Borts–Medlock (born 1967) comes from the matrilineal legacy of women potters, she is a great-great granddaughter of Sara Fina Tafoya, great-granddaughter of Christina Naranjo, granddaughter of Mary Cain and daughter of Linda Cain. Her work carries on the tradition of incised and carved black-on-black ware, as well as other forms of pottery. Her unique carving style is precise and pictorial; she credits her mother with encouraging her to express an individual, unique design sensibility.

Many other members of the extended Tafoya family have continued in the tradition of Sara Fina Tafoya to produce black-on-black ware including Mela Youngblood (1931–1991), Agapita Tafoya (1904–1959), Lucy Year Flower Tafoya (born 1935), Kelli Little Kachina (born 1967), Joy Cain (born 1947), and Myra Little Snow (born 1962).

The Heard Museum in collaboration with the Erie Art Museum produced two survey exhibitions, The Pottery of Margaret Tafoya, and Generation, A Survey of Margaret Tafoya's Descendants. The exhibitions focused on her distinct style of incised black-on-black ware and other styles such as polychrome, to unify historic, traditional functional pots into modern art forms. The shows highlighted three generations of Tafoya ceramic artists. In 1983, the Denver Art Museum produced an exhibition of over 100 ceramic objects by six generations of the Tafoya family. Tafoya was named a National Heritage Fellow by the National Endowment for the Arts in 1984.

Several members of the Chavarria family descending from matriarch potter Pablita Chavarria (born 1914) are well known for their black-on-black ware. These include Teresita Naranjo (1919–1999), Clara Shije (born 1924), Reycita Naranjo (born 1926), Elizabeth Naranjo (born 1929), Betty Naranjo (born 1956), Florence Browning (born 1931), Mary Singer (born 1936), Stella Chavarria (born 1939), Mildred Chavarria (born 1946), Jennifer Naranjo (born 1955) and Loretta (Sunday) Chavarria.

Members of the Gutierrez family of Kha'po Owingeh descending from matriarch potter Leocadia Gutierrez are known for their black-on-black ware, specifically Severa Tafoya (1890–1973) and Robert Cleto Nichols (Tall Mountain, born 1961). Their daughter, Angela Tafoya Baca (1927–2014) produced carved blackware pottery.

Linda and Merton Sisneros are also known for their black-on-black ware.

== Work by artists of other pueblos ==
In the 1920s the San Ildefonso (Pueblo P'ohwhóge Owingeh) black-on-black style began to flourish due to the work of Maria and Julian Martinez, and several artists were inspired by Nampeyo (1959–1942), of Hano, a Tewan pueblo on the East Mesa of Hopiland. Although her work looked very different from that of the artists working in the pueblos of the Rio Grande Valley, the depth of her knowledge influenced the artists working at P'ohwhóge Owingeh.

Hopi–Tewa potter Helen Naha (Feather Woman, 1922–1993) of the village of Polacca, south of First Mesa (Hopi: Wàlpi), produced black-on-black ware in addition to other styles.

Artists from Kewa Pueblo (Eastern Keres: [kʰewɑ], Navajo: Tó Hájiiloh, formerly known as Santo Domingo Pueblo), Ohkay Owingeh (Tewa: [ʔòhkèː ʔówĩ̂ŋgè], formerly known as San Juan Pueblo), and Picuris Pueblo (Tiwa: P'įwweltha [p’ī̃wːēltʰà]) also produce black-on-black ware, but in lesser quantities, as their primary ceramic work is mostly produced in other styles.

Harrison Begay Jr. (born 1961), a Navajo artist who is part Hopi, Jemez and Zuni learned black-on-black techniques from his wife and her family who are from Santa Clara Pueblo. His pots are produced with traditional polished and matte black surfaces, and are deeply carved revealing traces of the red clay underneath the oxidized surface.

== Contemporary art interpretations ==
Several contemporary artists have created works honoring the pottery of their ancestors. As a tribute to María Martinez and to Northern New Mexico's car culture, Rose Bean Simpson, a contemporary sculptor and second-generation Santa Clara Pueblo ceramic artist, created a museum installation titled Maria, that included a 1985 Chevy El Camino hot-rod custom-painted with traditional black-on-black motifs.

== Gallery ==
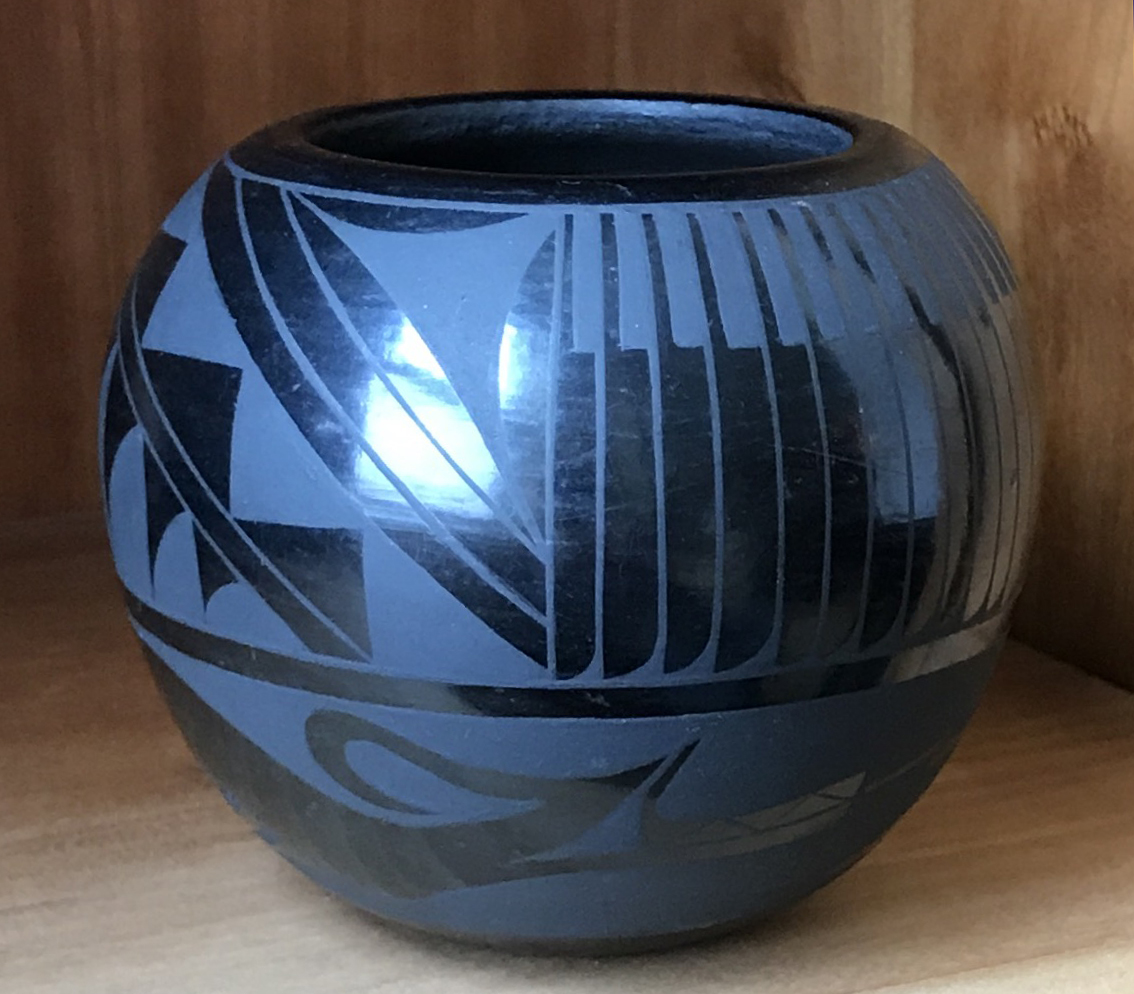
Pottery by Merton and Linda Sisneros, Santa Clara Pueblo

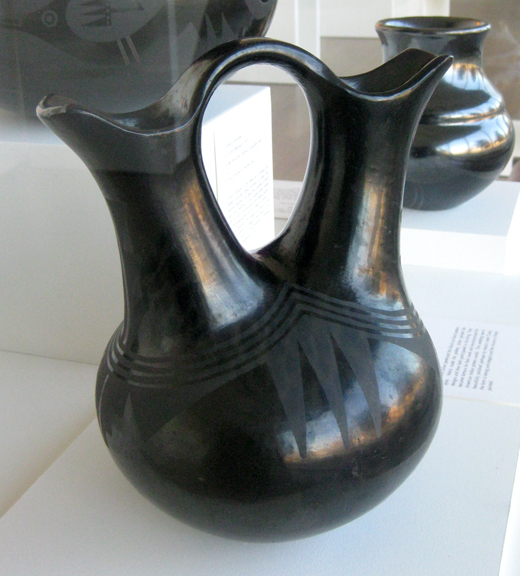
María and Julián Martinez wedding vase, San Ildefonso Pueblo, collection Fred Jones Jr. Museum of Art

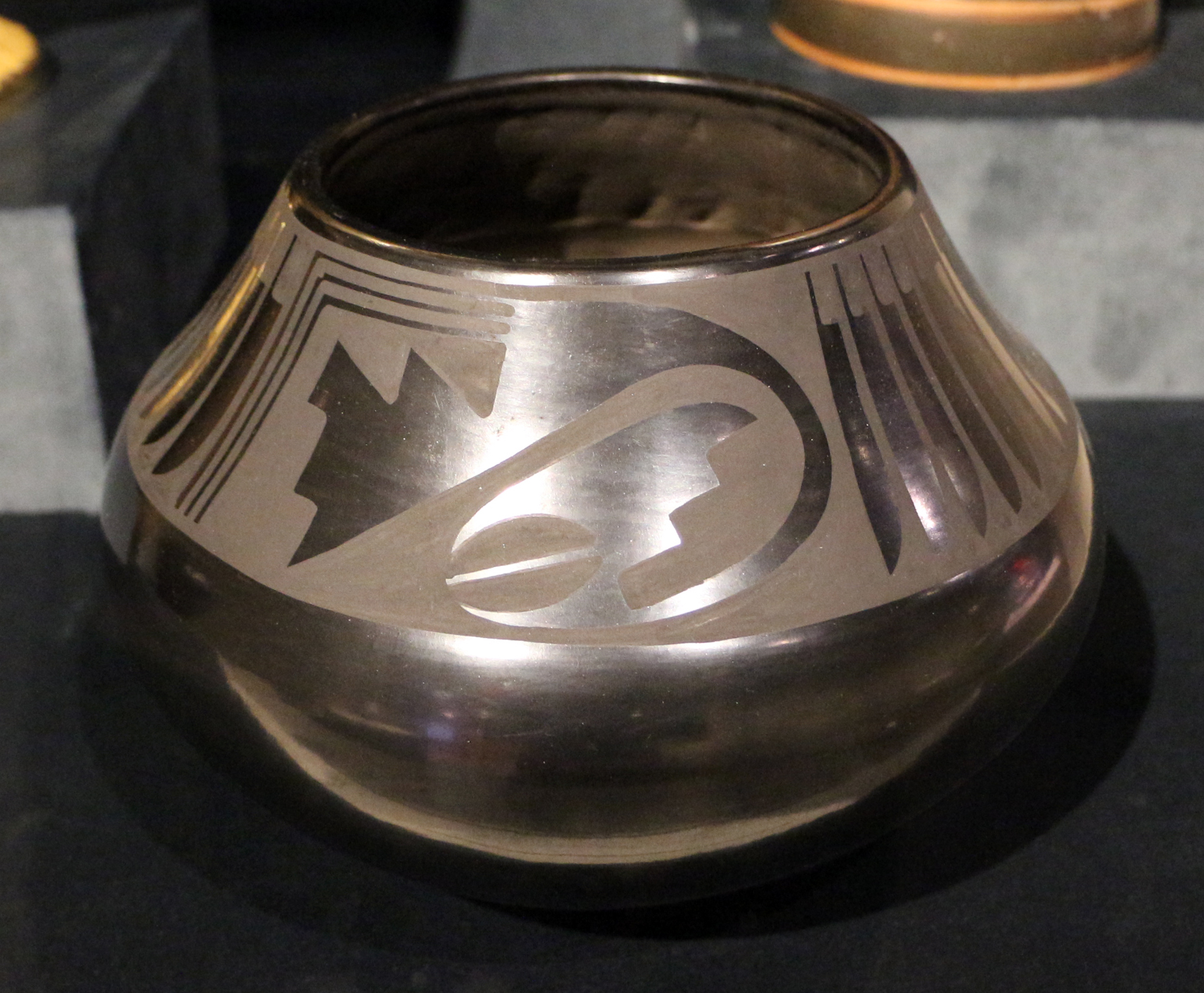
Maria Martinez and Santana Roybal Martinez, Ciotola, San Ildefonso Pueblo, 1940-50 ca, collection Cleveland Museum of Art

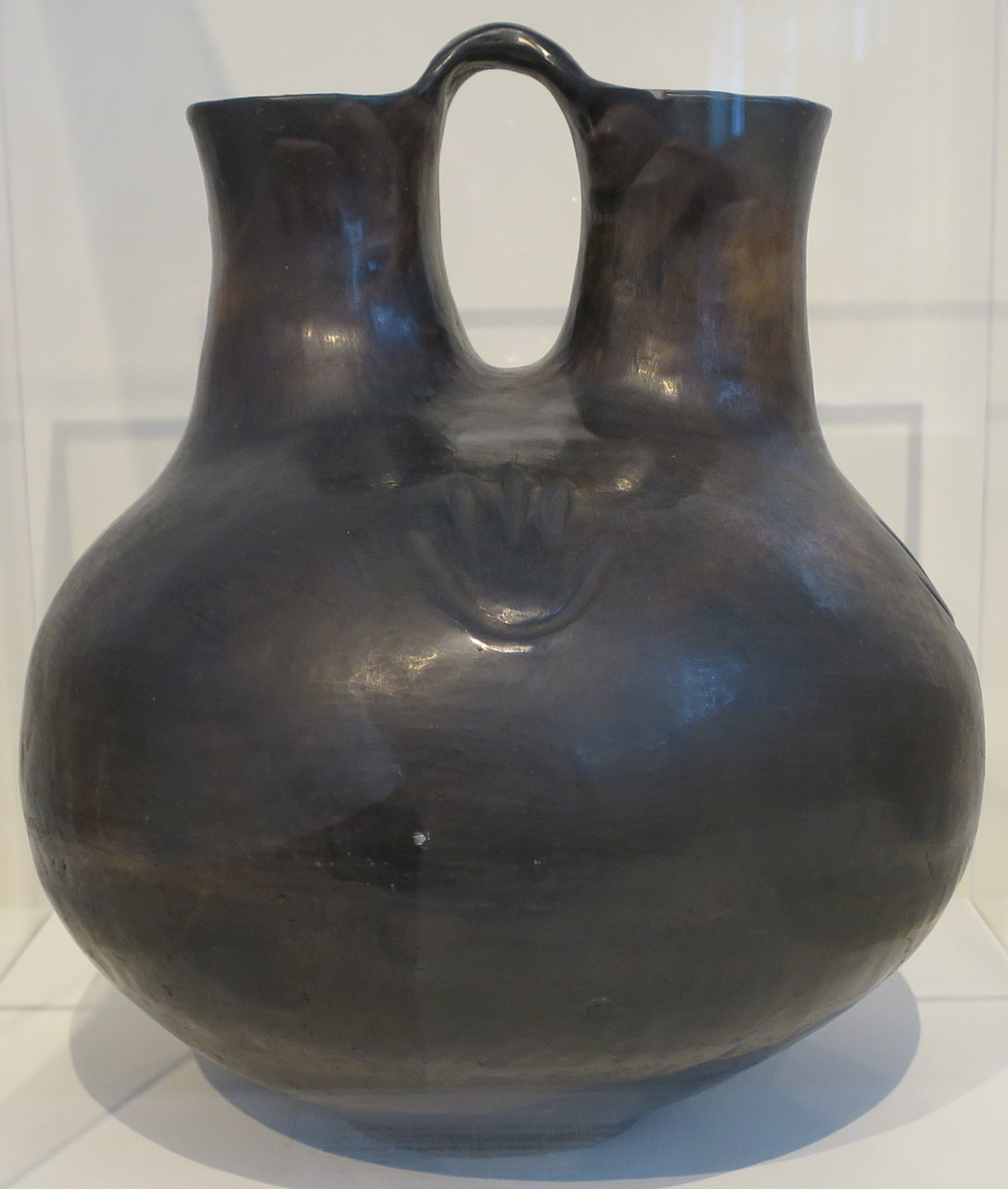
Santa Clara Pueblo double spouted vessel, collection Honolulu Museum of Art

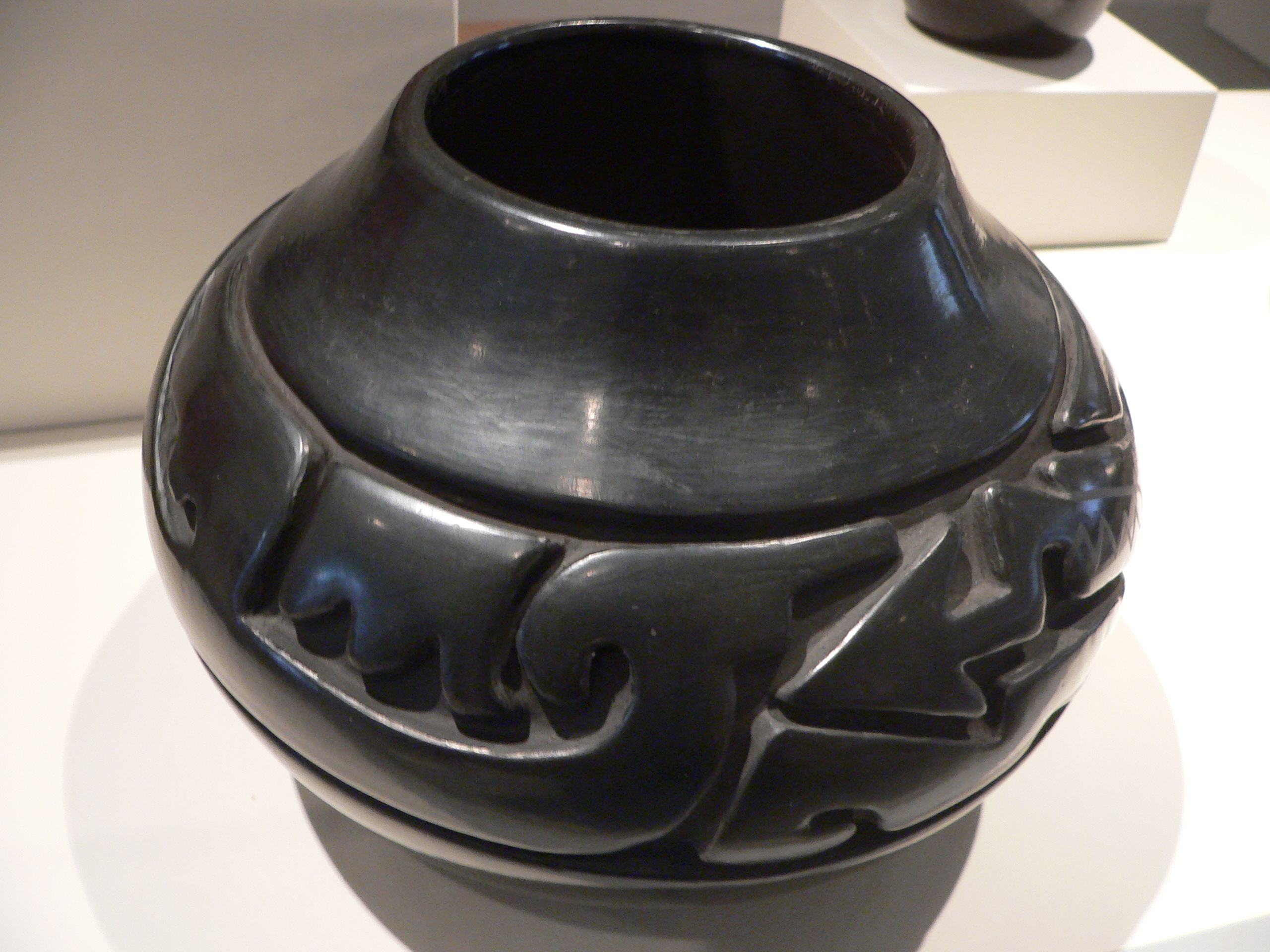
Bowl by Lula Tapia, San Ildefonso Pueblo, collection Stanford Museum

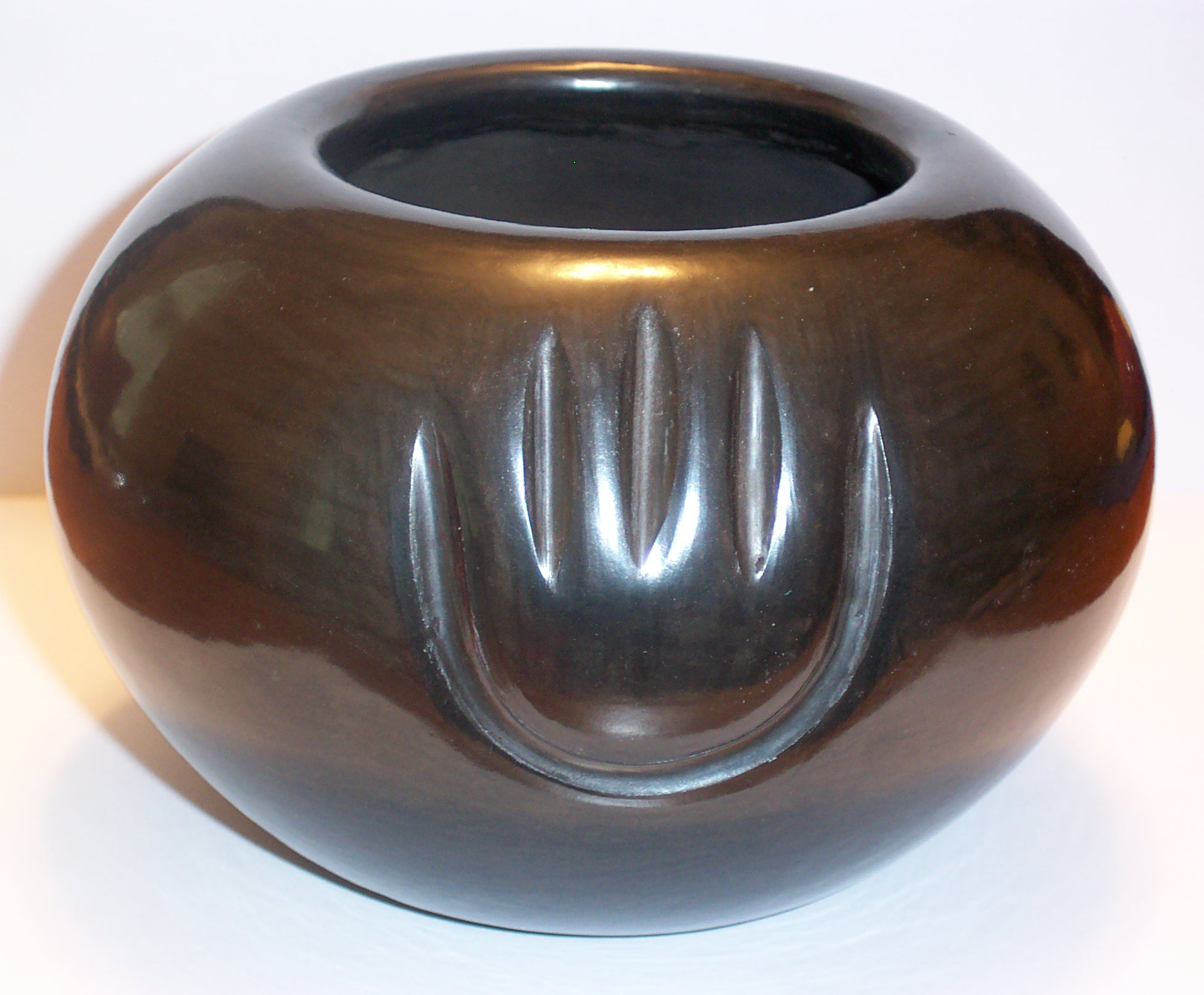
Black bowl with bear paw by Angela Baca, Santa Clara Pueblo

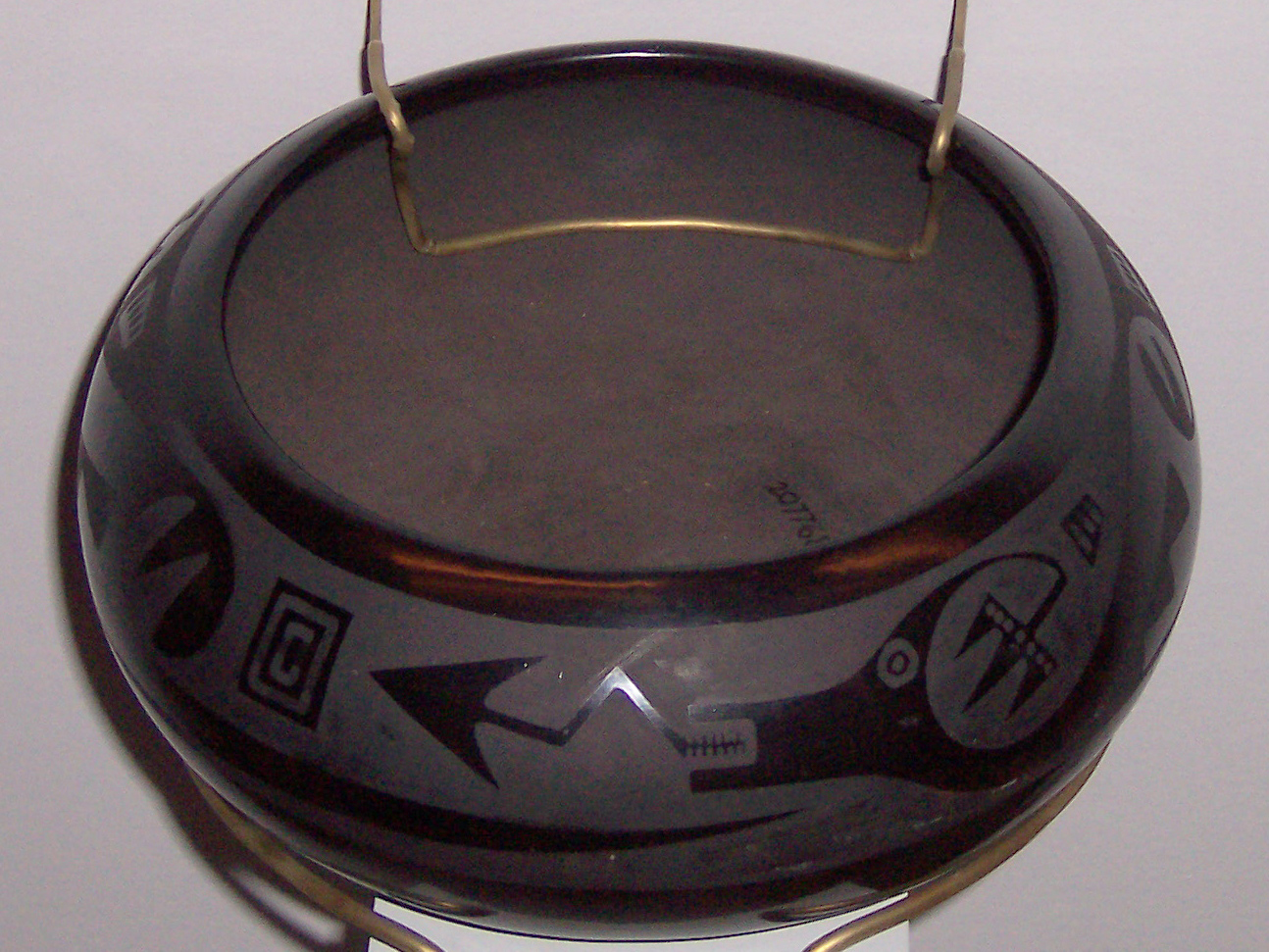
San Ildefonso Bowl, collection Field Museum

== See also ==
- Pueblo pottery
- Ceramics of indigenous peoples of the Americas
- Pit fired pottery
- Pottery of the American Southwest
- Visual arts by indigenous peoples of the Americas
- List of Native American Ceramic Artists
- Black-burnished ware
