= Tafoya =

Tafoya is a surname. Notable people with this surname include:

- Abraham Coronado Tafoya (born 1992), Mexican association football player
- Arthur Tafoya (1933–2018), American Roman Catholic Bishop
- Christopher Tafoya (born 1975), American rapper, better known under his stage name Sleep
- Joe Tafoya (born 1978), American National Football League player
- Jose Tafoya (1834–ca. 1913), American trader
- LuAnn Tafoya (born 1938), Native American potter
- Margaret Tafoya (1904–2001), Native American potter
- Michele Tafoya (born 1964/1965), American sportscaster and politician
- Paul Speckled Rock Tafoya (1952–2017), Native American sculptor and potter
- Rod Tafoya (born 1964), American baseball player
- Sara Fina Tafoya (1863–1949), Native American potter

== See also ==
- Domingo Tafoya House, a historic house in New Mexico, United States
