= Sara Fina Tafoya =

Native American potter (1863–1949)

Sara Fina Gutiérrez Tafoya
- Autumn Leaf
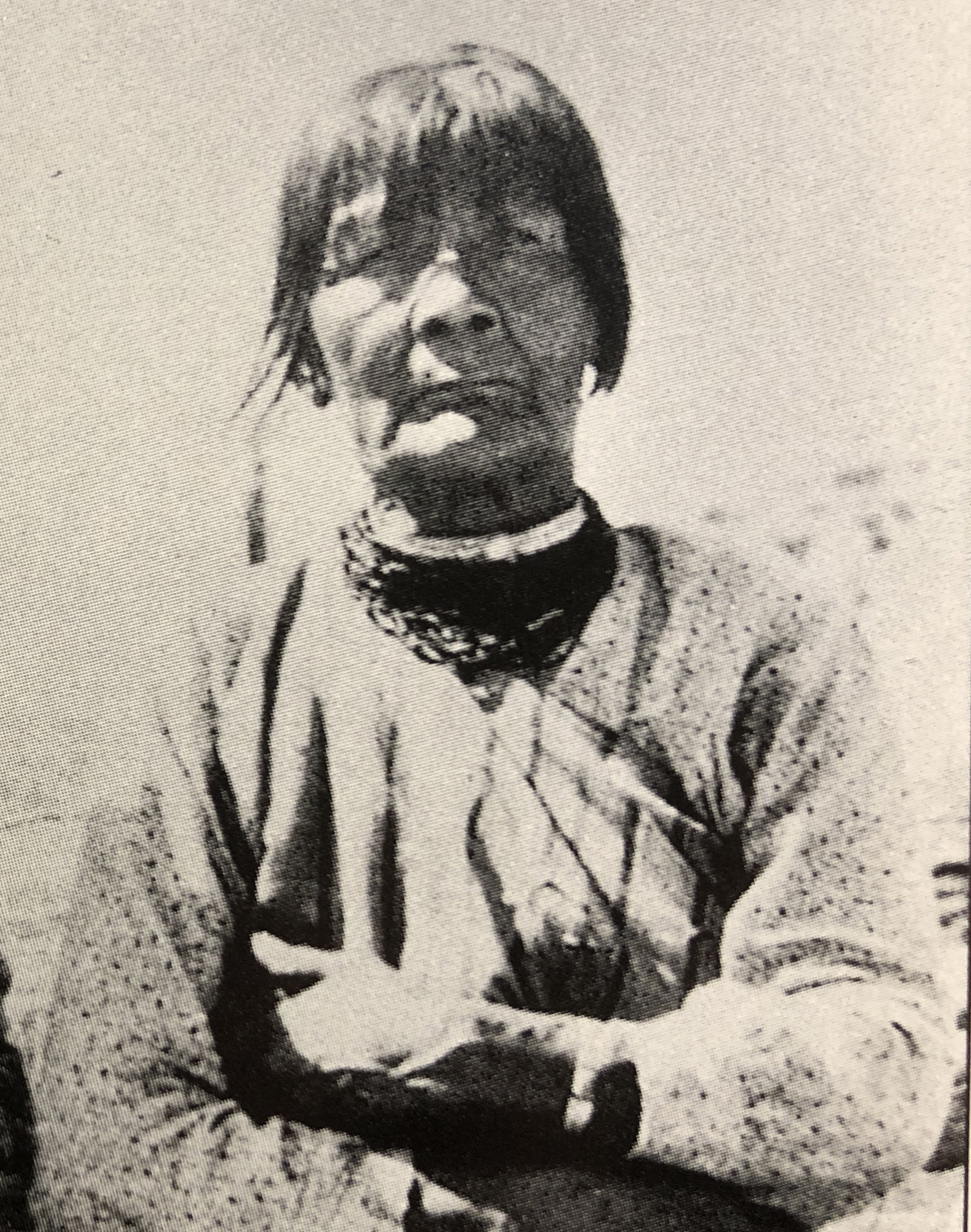
- Sara Fina Tafoya around 1900
- Died: 1949 (aged 85–86); New Mexico, US
- Spouse(s): José Geronimo Tafoya, "White Flower"
- Mother: Filomena Cajete Gutiérrez

Sara Fina Gutiérrez Tafoya (1863–1949) (sometimes spelled Serefina Tafoya and Serafina Tafoya) was a Tewa matriarch potter from Khaˀpʼoe Ówîngeh (in Tewa: [xɑ̀ʔp’òː ʔówîŋgè]), New Mexico.

Tafoya is known for her minimally-adorned blackware and black-on-black ware, frequently marked with the imprint of a bear claw motif. She has been referred to as "undoubtedly the outstanding Tewa potter of her time." The Tafoya family lineage of Puebloan potters "goes as far back as records exist." Tafoya's work consisted primarily of large-scale vessels that were marked with concave and convex impressions and carved designs.

== Personal life ==
Tafoya married Geronimo Tafoya with whom she had eight children. Many of her children, grandchildren, great-grandchildren and extended family became well-known potters including Margaret Tafoya, LuAnn Tafoya, Tammy Garcia, Nathan Youngblood and others.

== Collections ==
Her work is included in the collection of the Art Institute of Chicago, the Denver Art Museum, the Mount Hoyoke College Art Museum, the Nelson-Atkins Museum of Art, among other private and public collections.

== Gallery ==
Wedding vase by Sara Fina Tafoya

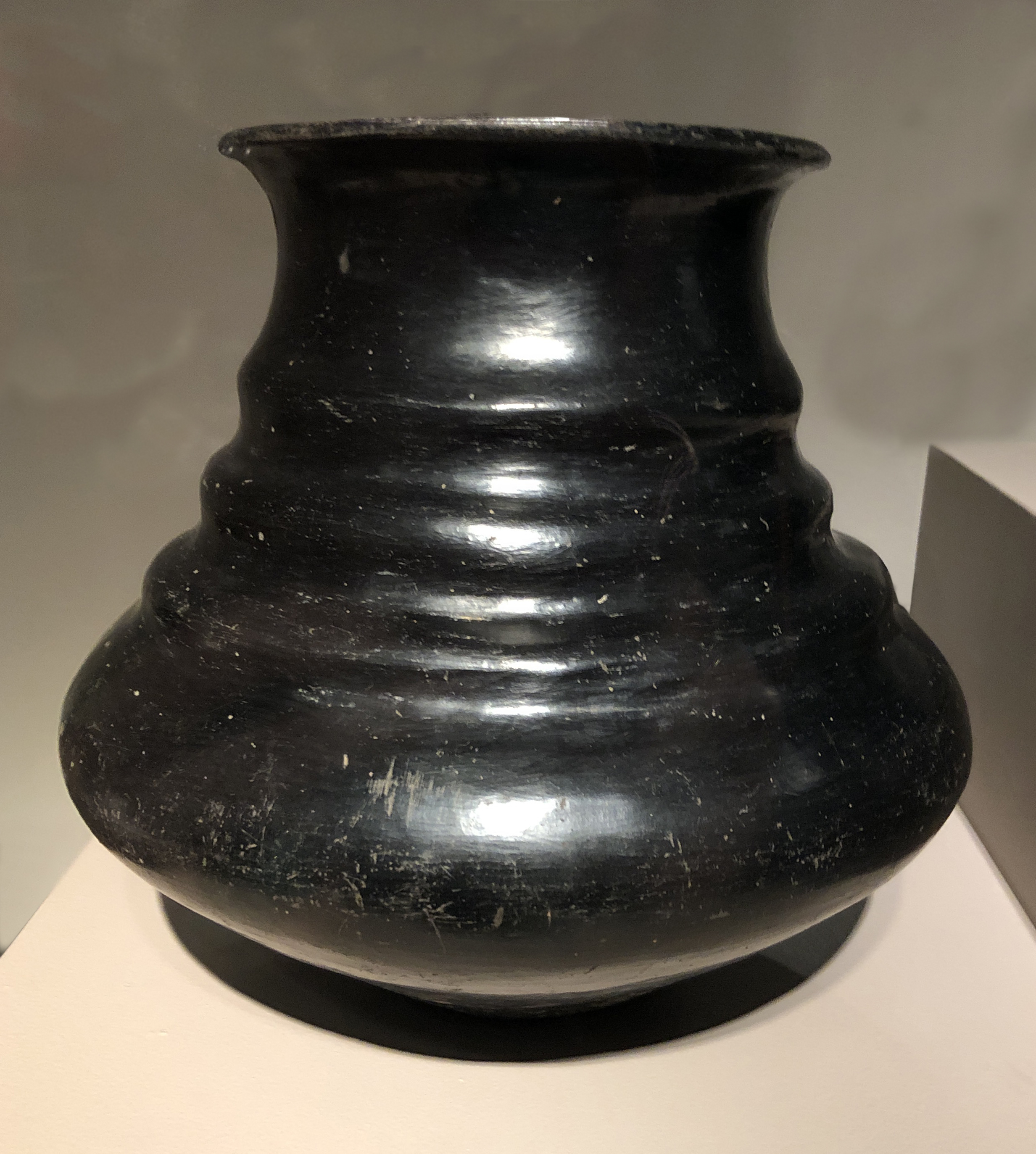
Sara Fina Tafoya, Water Jar, c.1890-1900

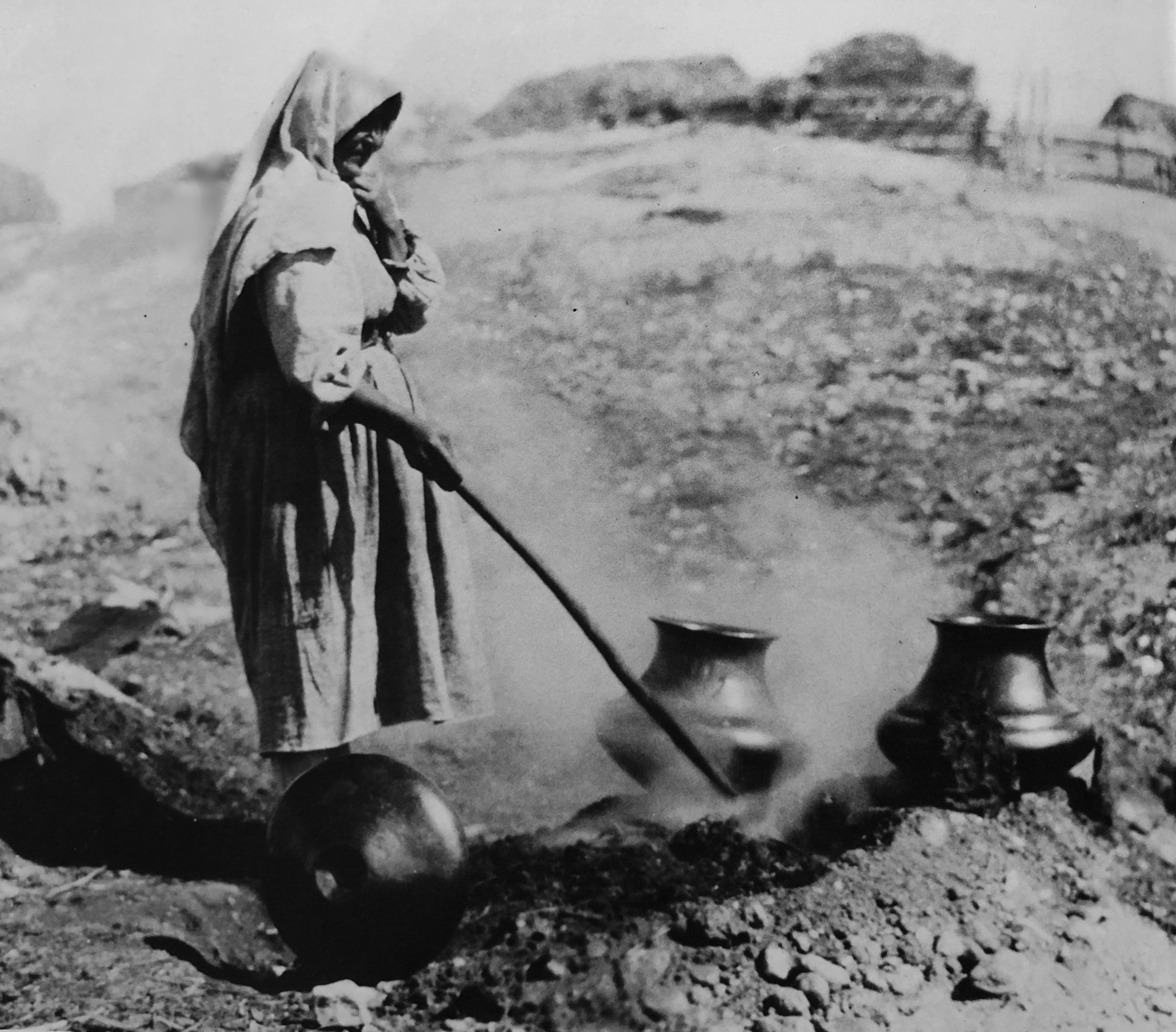
Sara Fina Tafoya firing blackware pottery at Santa Clara Pueblo, c. 1900

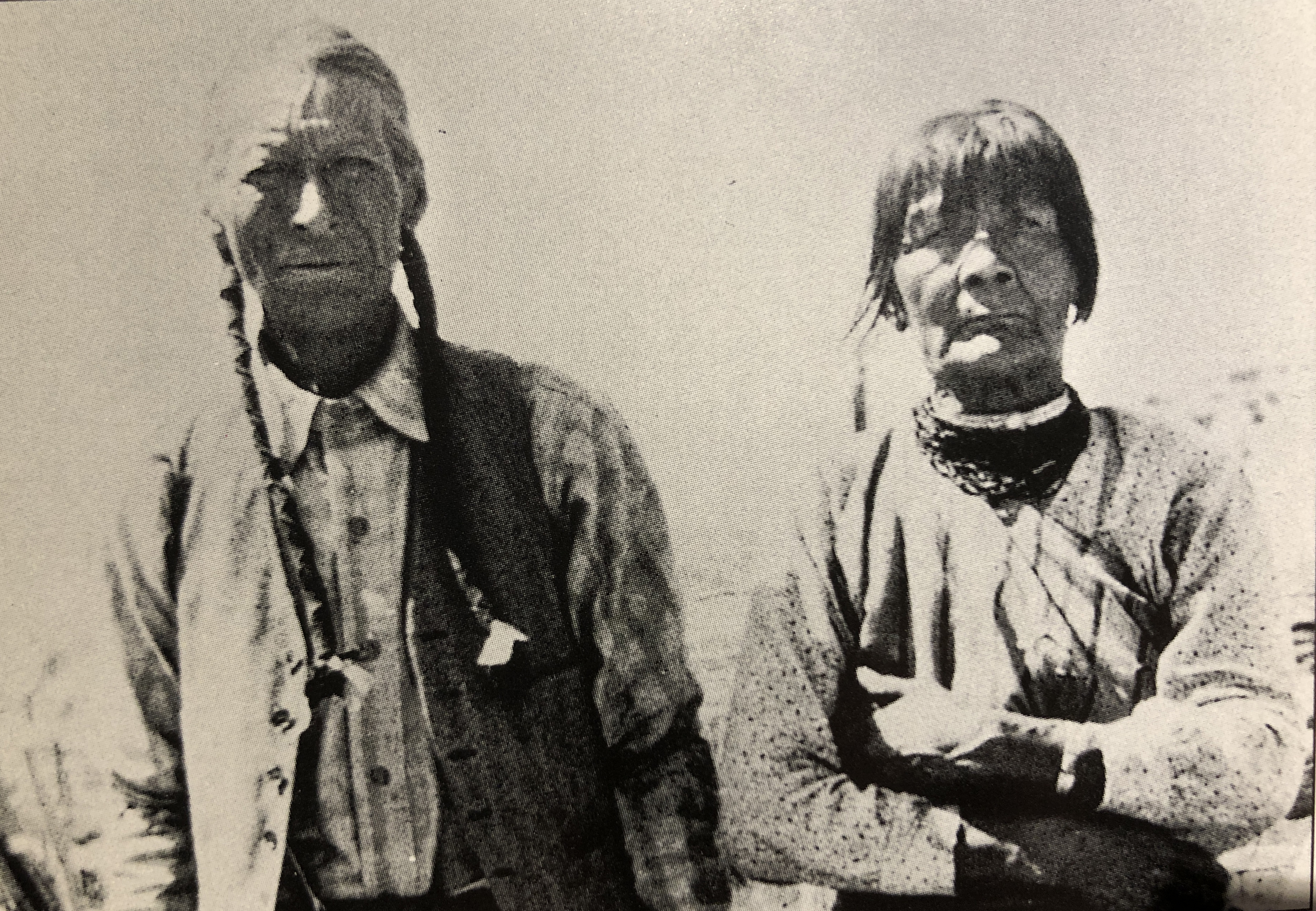
Geronimo and Sara Fina Tafoya c. 1900

== See also ==
- Black-on-black ware
- Pueblo pottery
