= Hupobi =

- Hupobi-ouinge
- U.S. National Register of Historic Places
- Nearest city: Ojo Caliente, New Mexico
- Area: 19 acres (7.7 ha)
- NRHP reference No.: 85000111
- Added to NRHP: January 18, 1985

Hupobi (Tewa: Hų́ų Póvi Ówîngeh Kayyee, pronounced [hṹː póvì ʔówîŋɡè kèːjìː], lit. 'cedar flower village ruin'), (also known as Homayo) is a Tewa Pueblo ancestral site in an address-restricted area of Abiquiú, New Mexico, United States. It was occupied from around 1350 until around 1550. In 1985, it was listed on the National Register of Historic Places listings in Rio Arriba County, New Mexico.

Hupobi is one of the principal Tewa Pueblo ancestral sites in New Mexico, US. Located on the west bank of the Rio Ojo Caliente, there are seven kivas. It is a large, compactly built pueblo ruin situated on a promontory on the west side of the river about a 1.5 miles (2.4 km) above Posege. The walls are of adobe about 1 foot (0.30 m). The kivas vary from 30–50 feet (9.1–15.2 m) in diameter and are all of the circular form. The village was well situated for defense, as it can be approached readily from the west side only. There is one main plaza or court which appears completely closed. Attached to this on the east are two sections which partially enclose another and smaller court. Three detached sections stand at a little distance from the main quadrangle.

Coordinates: 36°19′26″N 106°02′26″W
