= Nathan Youngblood =

Native American potter

Nathan Youngblood (born 1954) is a Native American potter from Santa Clara Pueblo, New Mexico, United States.

== Background ==
He was born in Fort Carson, Colorado to Mela (1931–1991) and Walt Youngblood. During his adolescent years Nathan's family traveled extensively due to his father's military career. When his family eventually returned to Santa Clara Pueblo, Nathan learned to make pottery by watching his grandmother "the matriarch of Santa Clara potters," Margaret Tafoya. Margaret taught him to make and burnish the pots, telling him to "take a little time especially with the polishing and you will be rewarded." His grandfather Alcario Tafoya taught him designs and carving. His mother Mela was a successful potter, who, with Helen Shupla, introduced the melon-shaped pot in Southwestern art.

== Artwork ==
Nathan has been making pottery since 1972. He creates black, red and tan traditional hand-coiled pottery in the form of jars, vases, bowls and canteens. He also makes carved and painted plates. His pots are generally large measuring above ten inches in diameter. Using traditional techniques Nathan often incorporates non-Tewa designs such as abstract shapes into his pieces. During the firing process Nathan uses the same traditional method as his grandmother. Each pot is fired individually so as not to risk destroying all of the pots at once should something happen during the firing process.

Nathan has become a highly respected potter known for his creative designs and the exceptional quality of his work. Since 1976, he has won over 44 awards at the Santa Fe Indian Market, often winning 1st and 2nd place. In 1987 he received the Jack Hoover Memorial Award for excellence in Santa Clara pueblo pottery at Santa Fe Indian Market.

Beginning in 1974, Nathan's work has been exhibited at many gallery shows in Scottsdale, Arizona and Santa Fe, New Mexico. He participated in the Sid Deusch Gallery show in New York City in 1985. His work has been exhibited at the White House and the Smithsonian American Art Museum in Washington, D.C., the Heard Museum in Phoenix, Arizona, the Gilcrease Museum in Tulsa, Oklahoma, and the Denver Museum of Nature and Science in Denver, Colorado.

Nathan has contributed much of his time to public services. He has served on the boards for the Gallup Inter-Tribal Ceremonial and the Southwestern Association for Indian Arts. Until recently he served on the board of directors for the Wheelwright Museum in Santa Fe. He has given lectures at various locations including the National Museum of American Art in Washington, D.C. and the Denver Museum of Natural History.
