= Grace Medicine Flower =

- Born: Grace Tafoya; December 13, 1938 (age 86); Santa Clara Pueblo
- Known for: Pottery
- Movement: Art of the American Southwest Santa Clara Pottery
- Spouse: John C. Hoover

Grace Medicine Flower is a potter, best known for her intricately carved miniature redware and blackware.

== Early life and education ==
Grace Medicine Flower was born in 1938 at Santa Clara Pueblo, New Mexico. She is a member of the famous Tafoya pottery family and the niece of Margaret Tafoya. Her pots from 1968 to 1972 were done in collaboration with her father, Camilio Tafoya, and are signed with both of their names.

=== Themes ===
Grace Medicine Flower's work reflects the spiritual beliefs of her ancestors and often features birds, wildlife, and flowers.

== Work ==
Medicine Flower creates her pottery from local clay she digs herself at Santa Clara Pueblo. She dries the clay in the sun and fires the work outside. She uses a knife or nail to carve her designs using the sgraffito style. Her work began in miniatures but has evolved to include larger bowls and jars.

=== Awards and nominations ===
Medicine Flower's work has won multiple awards at the Gallup Inter-Tribal Ceremonials.^{[usurped]}
