= Jacob Koopee Jr. =

Indigenous American artist

Jacob Koopee Jr. (March 31, 1970 – June 2011), also known as Jacob Nampeyo Koopee, was an American Hopi/Tewa potter and artist.

== Exhibitions ==
1. 2018 Hopi Visions: Journey of the Human Spirit, Dallas Museum of Art
2. 2005 Heard Museum- Elegance From Earth: Hopi Pottery Phoenix, Arizona
3. 2005 Heard Museum West- Buggin' Art: Surprise, Arizona
4. 2005 Heard Museum West: Our Stories, American Indian Art and Culture. Surprise, Arizona

== Collections ==
- Birmingham Museum of Art
- Dallas Museum of Art
- Eiteljorg Museum, Indianapolis
- Fine Arts Museums of San Francisco
- Heard Museum, Phoenix, Arizona
