= 'Agojo so'jo =

God in Tewa mythology

'Agojo so'jo or 'Agoyo so'yu (Tewa: Agóyó sóˀyó, pronounced [ʔɑ̀ɡójó sóʔjó], lit. 'big star') is a god in Tewa Pueblo mythology. He represents the Morning star, the brightest star in the morning.

'Agojo so'jo was the husband of the Evening Star. They were once mortals, but when the Evening Star died, 'agojo so'jo pursued her. Once 'agojo so'jo reached his wife, he could not bring himself to sleep with her, so he escaped. The Evening Star then gave chase to her husband. This eternal pursuit continues, presumably representing the transition of day and night. In San Juan Tewa stories, the wife sometimes overtake the husband, as the wife, thought to be deceased and without a heart, is a faster runner.

'Agojo so'jo is associated with warfare, and was addressed during times of war. He is also considered to be the messenger of the Sun.

He is also known in Tewa as Agóyó núukhųų sedó (pronounced [ʔɑ̀ɡójó núːxũ̀ː sèdó], lit. 'dark star man'). There was also a Nambé Tewa clan named after the deity.

The Hano Tewa worships a similar deity known as Ponu'chona. Ponu'chona is also identified with the morning star, and is associated with animals and hunting. Hunters would leave food offering for Ponu'chona. Similarly, the San Juan Tewa had a tale in which the Morning Star set free animals from the sky corral and distribute them on earth.
