= Rose Gonzales =

American potter (1900–1989)

Rose Cata Gonzales
- Born: 1900
- Died: 1989 (aged 88–89)
- Education: Ramona Sanchez Gonzales
- Known for: Pottery
- Movement: Influenced pottery making at San Ildefonso
- Spouse: Robert Gonzales (m. 1920)
- Children: son, Tse-Pe
- Awards: Numerous awards from the Santa Fe Indian Market and the Gallup Intertribal Ceremonial

Rose Cata Gonzales (1900–1989) was born in Ohkay Owingeh Pueblo in the U.S. state of New Mexico. She is known for her original carved blackware pottery, and for traditional pottery in the Ohkay Owingeh Pueblo style.

== Biography and artistic career ==
When she was very young, her parents died during a swine flu epidemic. She and her sister Pomasen were left orphans and lived with a relative, Mary Cata. In 1920 Gonzales married Robert Gonzales and, along with her sister, moved to his native pueblo of San Ildefonso.

It was her mother-in-law, Ramona Sanchez Gonzales, who taught Gonzales how to make pottery. She learned the methods of black-on-black ware, polished blackware and black-on-red. By 1930 she began to create very refined and highly polished, blackware and redware. The fine redware she made came from her home tradition of Ohkay Owingeh Pueblo.

In 1930 she also began her innovative process of deep carved pottery. Her carved blackware pottery was an original creation. She credits a shard of carved pottery that was found by her husband while deer hunting for giving her the idea. Using a sharp knife and a chisel she would carve out her designs. She carefully sanded her edges to create a "cameo" style with the design standing out in low relief. She would then sand the edges of her design to create more rounded forms. She used an old-style yucca brush when adding painted designs to her pieces. Some of her favorite designs were the Avanyu (water serpent), birds, clouds, seeds uncurling, thunderbird (mythology) figures and kiva steps.

When firing she used juniper wood and cow dung, placing the pots upside down on a metal grate to allow the flames to swirl evenly around them. She would often fire up to twenty pots at a time.

During the 1930s and 1940s she traded these innovative pots for food, allowing her to feed her large family. By the 1970s she had received numerous awards from the Santa Fe Indian Market, the Gallup Intertribal Ceremonial, establishing recognition for her work as a potter.

Gonzales taught her son Tse-Pe to make pottery along with his wife Dora and their daughter Irene. Gonzales and Tse-Pe sometimes worked together, especially when creating pottery in duotones (two shades of the same color). While Tse-Pe also carves pottery he prefers sgraffito, which is carving designs in low relief.

Gonzales had a major influence on pottery making at San Ildefonso Pueblo, New Mexico, and today her pieces have become highly valued by collectors. She died in 1989.
