= Crucita Calabaza =

Native American potter (1921–1999)

Crucita Gonzales Calabaza
- (Blue Corn)
- Crucita Calabaza (Blue Corn)
- Born: Crucita Gonzales; December 7, 1921; San Ildefonso Pueblo, New Mexico
- Died: May 3, 1999 (aged 77); Santa Fe, New Mexico
- Occupations: Native American Potter and Artist
- Known for: Polychrome San Ildefonso Pueblo Pottery
- Spouse: Santiago "Sandy" Calabazas
- Children: 10
- Relatives: 18 grandchildren, 12 great-grandchildren

Crucita Gonzales Calabaza (December 27, 1921 – May 3, 1999), also known as Blue Corn, was a Native American artist and potter from San Ildefonso Pueblo, New Mexico, in the United States. She became famous for reviving San Ildefonso polychrome wares and had a very long and productive career.

== Early life ==
Crucita Gonzales was born on December 27, 1921, in San Ildefonso Pueblo in Santa Fe County, New Mexico. Her maiden name is also spelled Gonzalez. Her grandmother first introduced her to pottery-making at the age of three. Maria Martinez's sister gave her the name Blue Corn during the people naming ceremony. Calabaza learned the black-on-black pottery tradition from Martinez.

Blue Corn attended school at the pueblo in her early years. She then went to Santa Fe Indian School, which was 24 miles (39 km) from home. While attending school in Santa Fe, her mother and father died, and she was sent to live with relatives in southern California where she worked as a maid for a short time in Beverly Hills.

At the age of 20, she married Santiago "Sandy" Calabaza, a silversmith from Kewa Pueblo. Together they settled at San Ildefonso, where she bore and raised 10 children. During World War II, Blue Corn worked as a housecleaner in Los Alamos for the physicist, J. Robert Oppenheimer.

== Career ==
After her first son, Joseph, was born, she returned to pottery making. Santiago quit his job to help her carve, paint, and design her pots. By the late 1960s she had established herself as a leader in polychrome styles. After her husband died in 1972, her son Joseph began helping her with her pots. During the 1960s and 1970s, she led many workshops on pottery making in both the U.S. and Canada. Although Blue Corn also made redware and blackware, she is especially noted for her finely polished slips and exhaustive experimentations with clays and colors, producing cream polychrome on jars and plates. She is particularly well known for her feather and cloud designs.

Blue Corn is known for the reintroduction of polychrome fine whiteware and has received critical acclaim from several publications including The Wall Street Journal. Her pottery can be found in the Smithsonian Institution and other leading museums throughout America and Europe as well as in private collections. She won more than 60 awards including the 8th Annual New Mexico Governors Award in 1981. This is New Mexico's greatest recognition of artistic achievement.

== Death ==
Calabaza died on May 3, 1999, leaving ten children, 18 grandchildren and 12 great-grandchildren.
