= Tammy Garcia =

American Santa Clara Pueblo artist

- Born: Los Angeles, California, US
- Known for: Ceramics, sculpture
- Awards: New Mexico Governor's Awards for Excellence in the Arts (2008)

Tammy Garcia is an American sculptor and ceramic artist. Garcia translates Pueblo pottery forms and iconography into sculptures in bronze and other media.

== Early life ==
Tammy Garcia (born Tammy Borts) was born in Los Angeles, California, in August 1969. A member of the Santa Clara Pueblo in northern New Mexico, she comes from a long line of Santa Clara Pueblo artists. Her great-great-great-grandmother Sara Fina Tafoya was a potter. Additionally, her great-great aunt, Margaret Tafoya, was a noted potter of the early 20th century, along with her sister, Christina Naranjo. Subsequent generations of potters in Garcia's family included her grandmother, Mary Cain, and her mother, Linda Cain.

Garcia grew up in Santa Clara Pueblo, near Española, New Mexico. While her mother was at work, she stayed with her grandmother, Mary Cain, where she made small animals out of clay. Garcia also helped her grandmother by disposing of the used manure from the pottery-making process. From a young age, she learned to respect the clay pots, and by the age of sixteen, she had learned how to make pottery herself by watching her mother and grandmother. Although Garcia began selling her pots, she initially doubted whether she could actually make a living from it.

Garcia attended high school in Española, but left after 10th grade, later earning her G.E.D. Instead of continuing her education in traditional academics, she chose to train as a cosmetologist or hairdresser. However, three months into her training, a client complained about her haircut, which led to a disagreement with her instructor. This experience made Garcia realize that she did not like being given orders, so she abandoned this career path. She got a job as a dishwasher at a local restaurant, but it only lasted two weeks. Afterwards, Garcia decided that making pottery would be a better way to earn a living. She and her sister moved to Taos, New Mexico, where she continued to refine her pottery-making skills.

== Career ==
After moving to Taos, Garcia took a job at a local art gallery. The steady income from the gallery allowed her to cover her bills and spend more time on her craft. Within the year, her success in selling her pottery enabled her to reduce her hours at the gallery to part-time. By the time she turned 18, Garcia had transitioned to creating pottery full-time and exhibited her work at the Inter-Tribal Indian Ceremonial in Gallup, NM, one of the oldest showcases of Native American arts, dance, and music in the country. By the age of 21, in 1990, she had won her first ribbon at the Inter-Tribal Indian Ceremonial and gained representation at the gallery in Scottsdale, Arizona.

Garcia decided to reject the market's expectations for Pueblo potters, believing they promoted an unrealistic notion of authenticity. She was determined not to succumb to market pressures that might compromise her independence and integrity. Despite being advised that her unconventional work would not sell, she and her husband, whom she married in 1990, devised a plan to maintain control over her art by avoiding wholesalers and collaborating only with selected galleries. Gallery 10 in Santa Fe quickly sold every piece she created.

In 1998, Garcia and her husband opened Blue Rain Gallery in Taos, which exclusively represented her work, moving the gallery to Santa Fe eight years later. In 1999, she began sculpting with bronze, a transition that Garcia felt stimulated her creativity and artistic inspiration. Over time, she expanded her artistry to also include designing and making silver jewelry, as well as working with glass.

Garcia's art portrays the stories of Pueblo life through traditional and contemporary carvings of insects and animals. She is recognized for her pottery, having received multiple awards at prominent events, such as the Santa Fe Indian Market and the Heard Museum Guild Indian Art Fair & Market. Garcia's work has also been featured in a solo exhibition at the National Museum of Women in the Arts and is included in collections across the country, such as the Heard Museum, Eiteljorg Museum, Autry National Center, Rockwell Museum, National Museum of Women in the Arts, National Museum of the American Indian, and the Capitol Art Collection in Santa Fe. By 2008, she had become the youngest artist featured at the National Museum of Women in the Arts, located in Washington, D.C. That same year, she was also one of the youngest artists to receive the Governor's Award for Excellence in the Arts in New Mexico.

== Awards ==
- 1990: Garcia is awarded first prize, her first ribbon, at the Gallup Intertribal Ceremonials.
- 1995: Garcia's Santa Clara pot with eagle designs wins Best of Pottery award at the Santa Fe Indian Market.
- 1997: Vessel with geometric designs representing a young maiden dancer offering gratitude for the corn harvest wins First Place award for Best of Division at the Santa Fe Indian Market.
- 2008: Garcia is awarded the New Mexico Governor's Award for Excellence in the Arts.

== Personal life ==
As of 2003 Garcia was living in Taos, New Mexico.

== Selected exhibitions ==
- 1987-88 Inter-Tribal Indian Ceremonial, Gallup, NM
- 1990 O'Odham Tash, Casa Grande, AZ
- 1990 Andrews Pueblo Pottery, Albuquerque, NM
- 1991 Eight Northern Indian Pueblos Arts & Crafts, Ohkay Owingeh, NM
- 1991–98 Gallery 10, Group Show, Scottsdale, AZ and Santa Fe, NM
- 1992 O'Odham Tash, Casa Grande, AZ
- 1992 Gallery 10, Group Show, Beverly Hills, CA and Santa Fe, NM
- 1993–98 Santa Fe Indian Market, Santa Fe, NM
- 1994–1998 Gallery 10, group shows, Scottsdale, AZ
- 1995 Inter-Tribal Ceremonial, Gallup, NM
- 1998 Blue Rain Gallery, The Harris Collection Show, Taos, NM
- 1999–2003 Blue Rain Gallery, annual Indian Market show, Taos, NM
- 1999–2002, 2004, 2006 Blue Rain Gallery, annual Show on the Road, various locations
- 2001 Peabody Essex Museum, Salem, MA
- 2001 Heard Museum, Phoenix, AZ
- 2002 Changing Hands: Art without Reservations I, American Craft Museum, New York, NY
- 2003 From the States Exhibit, National Museum for Women in the Arts, Washington, D.C.
- 2003 Blue Rain Gallery, 10th Anniversary Celebration, Taos, NM
- 2004–08 Blue Rain Gallery, annual Indian Market show, Santa Fe, NM
- 2005 Blue Rain Gallery, Visions in Glass with Preston Singletary, Santa Fe, NM
- 2005 "Tammy Garcia Retrospective", Eiteljorg Museum, Indianapolis, IN
- 2007 Blue Rain Gallery, 15th Anniversary Celebration, Taos, NM
- 2007 "New Visions: Inspired by Tradition" with Evelyn Fredericks, Museum of Indian Arts and Culture, Santa Fe, NM
- 2007 SOFA Chicago (Sculptural Objects and Functional Art), Blue Rain Gallery, Chicago, IL
- 2008-09 "Beyond Tradition: The Pueblo Pottery of Tammy Garcia", National Museum of Women in the Arts, Washington, DC
- 2008 Heart of the West Art Exhibition, National Cowgirl Museum and Hall of Fame, Fort Worth, TX
- 2008 Blue Rain Gallery, "Visions in Glass II" with Preston Singletary, Santa Fe, NM
- 2008 SOFA New York (Sculptural Objects and Functional Art), Blue Rain Gallery, New York, NY
- 2008 SOFA Chicago (Sculptural Objects and Functional Art), Blue Rain Gallery, Chicago, IL
- 2009 LA Art Show, Blue Rain Gallery, Los Angeles, CA
- 2009 Blue Rain Gallery, Tammy: Effigies in Glass-A Collaboration with Shelley Muzylowski Allen, Taos, NM
- 2009 SOFA WEST: Santa Fe, Tammy: Effigies in Glass-A Collaboration with Shelley Muzylowski Allen, Santa Fe, NM
