= Helen Shupla =

American artist

Helen Shupla (1928–1985) was an American potter from Santa Clara Pueblo, New Mexico.

== Career ==
Shupla was born in 1928 as a member of the Santa Clara Pueblo, with heritage from Tohono O'odham (Papago).

Helen was active in her pottery work throughout her life, particularly in the 1940s through 1960s.

Shupla is most well known in the art world for her melon-shaped pots; she has been described as "the master of Santa Clara melon bowls". However, she began her career as a more traditional potter, producing black on black pottery and carving bowls, plates, and other vessels. Upon discovering the elasticity of Hopi clay, Helen began to experiment with different techniques of producing pots. Her signature melon pots are made not by carving segments into the clay, but instead by pushing segments out. This process is time-intensive, and it is easy to poke holes that cannot be fixed into the clay. Her husband would sometimes add carvings to her pots after she was done shaping them. Today, Helen's iconic melon pots can reach prices of up to 4 or 5 figures.

Helen earned four first-place ribbons and many second- and third-place ribbons at the Santa Fe Indian Market.

Her works are held by museums including the Heard Museum, the Museum of Fine Arts, Boston, the Fine Arts Museums of San Francisco, the Brooklyn Museum, and the National Museum of the American Indian.

== Personal life and death ==
Helen married Kenneth Shupla of the Hopi tribe. They had two daughters and one son. One of the daughter's Jeannie, married Alton Komalestewa of the Hopi tribe. She taught Alton her unique melon pot technique, which he continues to use to this day.

Shupla died in 1985.
