= Rod Tafoya =

American baseball player

Rod Tafoya is currently an Indy Ball player at 57 years old. He has a lifetime ERA of 7.68 according to his profile on Baseball Reference. He was signed in April 2014 by the Alpine Cowboys and coach Ryan Stevens to participate in the independent Pecos League. On June 25, 2014-Rod was activated by the Cowboys and pitched one out in a lefty-lefty situation against the Santa Fe Fuego in the bottom of the eighth inning in the Cowboy's 6–3 loss to the Fuego. He pitched against the Pecos League's second best hitter, All Star Nick Billinger, who was batting .461. Tafoya retired Billinger with an outside slider that was hit to the first baseman for an out. He has since then been signed for the 2015 season...

== Early life ==
Tafoya graduated from St. Michael's High School in Santa Fe, New Mexico, where as a senior he posted a 2–5 record with a 0.89 ERA. He was voted by district coaches to the All-District 2-AAA Team as both a right fielder and pitcher. Later that year he signed a letter of intent to play collegiately in the NAIA with the New Mexico Highland Cowboys. He pitched for the Cowboys immediately as a freshman, joining the starting rotation during the playoffs against Mesa State. He stayed ay NMHA from 1982 to 1985.

In 1985, Rod transferred to NAIA powerhouse Newman University, where he met Newman coach Paul Sanagorski, who was the pitching coach for the Jayhawk Summer League's Wichita Broncos. The Broncos reached the NBC (National Baseball Congress) World Series that summer. At Newman, Rod achieved an NAIA All-District 7 mention while posting a 6–2 record and 86 strikeouts (a then school record). He also received his college degree in business management.

== Professional career ==
In 1986, Rod signed his first professional baseball contract for the Puerto Vallarta Dolphins of the Mexican Winter League's AA. He won 10 games as the team's no 1 starter, making the league's All-Star Team.

In 1987, he pitched for the AA Mexican Tabasquena League's Comalcalco Cocaoteros after posting a 5–5 record. He was optioned to the Mexican League's AAA Aguascalientes Rieleros in June 1987 at the age of 23.

In 1989, Rod finally signed with an American minor league team. The Boise Hawk's manager Mal Fichman invited Tafoya to an “invite only” tryout camp in Ontario, California, where Tafoya was one of three players signed by the Hawks. He was the team's no. 5 starter posting a 3–4 record with 44 strikeouts in 47 innings and a 3.26 ERA.

After an arm injury in the Mexican League's AA Winter League in 1989, Tafoya signed with the Class-A New York-Penn League's Erie Sailors as their no. 5 starter. The arm injury flared up again and Tafoya was released in July 1990.

In 1991 Rod played in amateur baseball wherever he could find a team. He was introduced to the Men's Senior Baseball League in 1994 at the age of 29 while living in Oregon. In his first three years in the league he won 37 games while losing only three.

In 1997, Rod returned to minor league baseball at 33 years old, signing with the Prairie League's Regina Cyclones. He led the team in wins with six.

=== Return to Mexico ===
In 2005, Rod returned to Mexico pitching in the Zona 5A League in Chihuahua, Mexico. He went 5–0 with a 0.96 ERA for Mar y Sol, including a championship start over Villahermosa to win the Zona 5A championship, Casas Grandes first since 1977. This prompted another AA Mexican League promotion to pitch for the Astros de Piedras Negras of the Liga Instuccional de Coahuila. He went 3-0 for Piedras Negras as a 41-year-old veteran.

In 2012, Rod resurfaced in professional baseball, pitching for the Santa Fe Fuego of the Independent Pecos League. He was chosen to be the team's no.1 starter, pitching game one in front of a packed house at his home town of Santa Fe, New Mexico. He was credited with a no-decision in his team's 16–8 victory over Trinidad.

Also in 2012, Rod wrote his autobiography entitled Ageless Arm… My Passion Lives in the Core, published by Speaking Volumes.

He was signed by the Taos Blizzard of the Pecos League the following year and posted an 0–1 record with 12 innings pitched, one walk, 12 strikeouts, and a 2.25 ERA as a 49-year-old professional.

== 300th win ==
From 1994 to 2014 while in both the 25-and-over MSBL and the 18-and-over MABL (Men's Adult Baseball League) Rod recorded a record of 301–60. His 300th victory came on May 4, 2014, at the age of 49. He pitched a 139-pitch complete game over the Albuquerque Colt 45's-as his Albuquerque Yankees won 13–4. In this historic game, Rod recorded 13 strikeouts.

The “300-Game” story went viral through an article written by the Associated Press, as over 71 stories were written in various newspapers across America, including Sports Illustrated, ESPN, Fox News, Fox Sports, MSNBC Sports, Boston Herald, Miami Herald, USA Today among many others.

On May 28, 2014-the City of Santa Fe honored Rod with a proclamation from the mayor proclaiming Rod “The Ageless Arm” Tafoya “300th Victory Day” in Santa Fe.

During the 20-year time period it took Rod to win 300 games, he recorded the following milestones en route to 300:

- In May 2013, Rod recorded an “MSBL State Record” 23 strikeouts in 9 innings against the Albuquerque Indians in a playoff victory.
- In 2013, at the age of 49, playing in his first 50-and-over regional tournament in Las Vegas, Nevada-Rod recorded a 22-strikeout game with no walks against 8-time national champion Sacramento Tribe.
- From 1994 to 2014, Rod pitched and won a total of seven MSBL/MABL state championships in nine tries. Three out of the seven state championships were in the 18-and-over MABL when Rod was 42–48 years of age, showing his durability as a pitcher. All of his state championship victories were complete games.
- Five no hitters, including one perfect game.
- One “20-Game Win Season” in 1998.
- One “20 Home Run Season” in 1998.
- “Four Home Runs” in one game in 1998.
- One 17–0 season 1n 1999, including a 1.17 ERA
- A no-hitter with 14 strikeouts at age 47.
- A “double win victory day” in the MSBL Puerto Rican Winter Tournament which included 222 pitches, an MVP, and a Puerto Rico Winter Tournament championship at age 47.
- From 1986 to 2014 his team's amassed a total of 23 championships, including 14 state championships (7 in New Mexico), 8 national championships, (11 second-place finishes in national competition), and one professional championship.
- Rod won a combined total of 94 amateur and professional games from 1982 to 1993, giving him a total of 395 wins in his career through 2014. This encompasses 32 years...
- Won an average 15 wins per season for 20 straight years... Lost an average of three games per season for 20 straight years... (301-60)
- Played with over 87 teams from 1982 to 2014
- Threw over 70,00 pitches (with no arm surgery)
