= LuAnn Tafoya =

Native American ceramicist (born 1938)

- Born: 1938; Santa Clara Pueblo, New Mexico, United States
- Known for: Pottery

LuAnn Tafoya (born 1938 in Santa Clara Pueblo, New Mexico) is a Native American potter. Like her mother, Margaret Tafoya, and her grandmother Sara Fina Tafoya, she creates large ceramic pieces using traditional methods. She is known for her large, highly polished black and red vessels decorated with variations on classic imagery and forms, like traditional bear paw imprints, the avanyu, clouds, birds, kiva steps, winds and gourds.

Tafoya prospects, sifts, and mixes her clay with volcanic sand at Santa Clara Pueblo in much the same way as her ancestors. The black and red clay slips for the coating come from Santo Domingo Pueblo. She uses a coiling method to create the height and shape of her pieces, after which she applies a clay slip coating and polishes until a high shine is obtained, using small quantities of lard intermittently, and carves the pieces with screwdrivers. The pots are fired in traditional open firing after being slowly pre-heated.

Her work is in collections across the US, including the Heard Museum, the Cantor Arts Center at Stanford University, the National Museum of the American Indian and the National Museum of Women in the Arts.
