= Margaret Tafoya =

Native American potter (1904–2001)

- Corn Blossom
- Born: Maria Margarita Tafoya; August 13, 1904; Santa Clara Pueblo, New Mexico, U.S.
- Died: February 25, 2001 (aged 96); Santa Clara Pueblo, New Mexico, U.S.
- Known for: Traditional Pottery

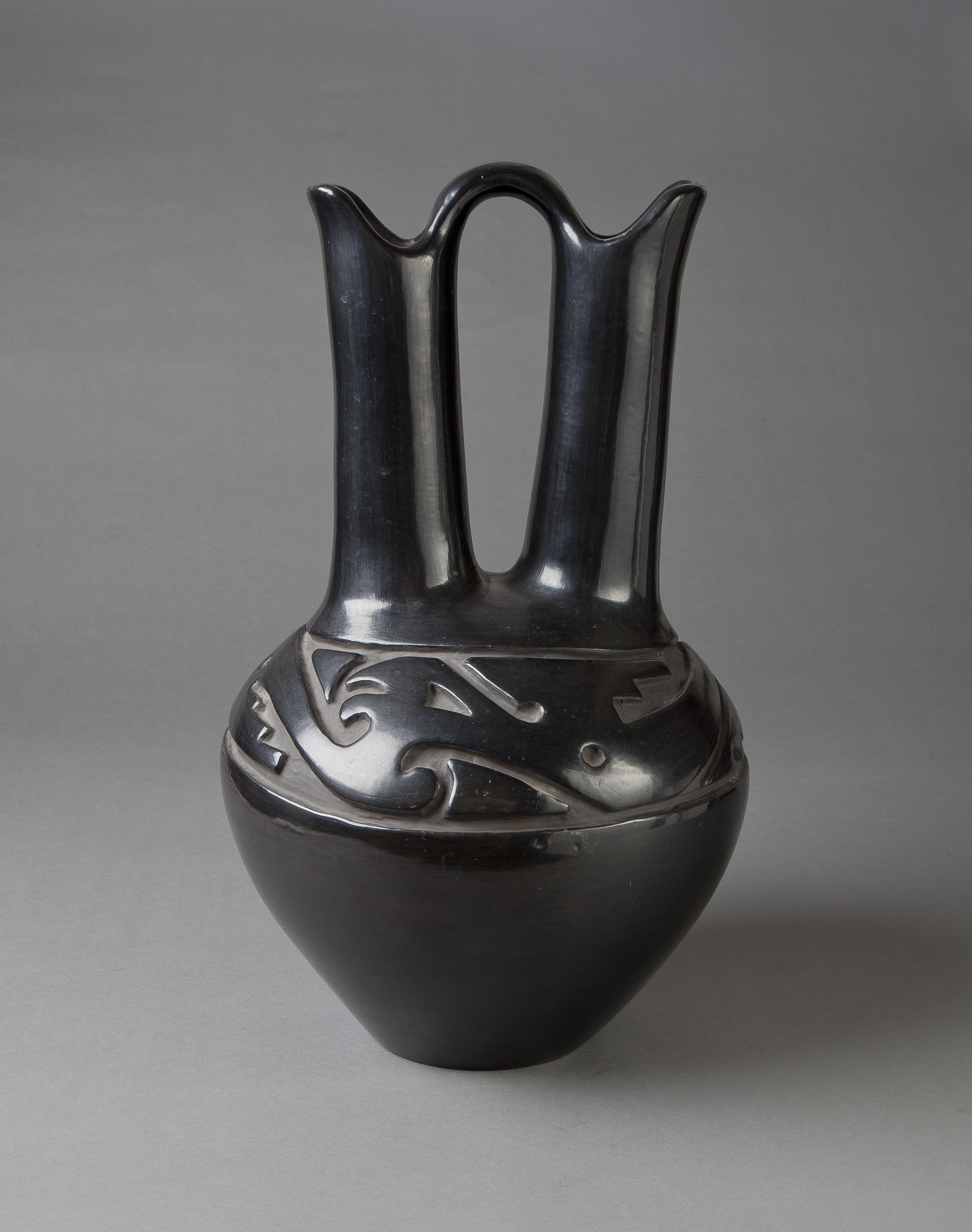
Wedding Vase, c. 1970, by Margaret Tafoya

Maria Margarita "Margaret" Tafoya (Tewa name: Corn Blossom; August 13, 1904 – February 25, 2001) was the matriarch of Santa Clara Pueblo potters. She was a recipient of a 1984 National Heritage Fellowship awarded by the National Endowment for the Arts, which is the United States government's highest honor in the folk and traditional arts.

== Early life ==
Margaret was the daughter of Sara Fina (sometimes spelled Serafina) Guiterrez Tafoya (1863–1949) and Jose Geronimo Tafoya (1863–1955). She attended the Santa Clara Pueblo elementary school, and then the Santa Fe Indian School from 1915 to 1918. She had to drop out of high school to help her family during the flu pandemic of 1918.

Margaret learned the art of making pottery from her parents, and was particularly influenced by her mother. Sara Fina was considered the leading potter of Santa Clara in her day, as the master of making exceptionally large, finely polished blackware. She also occasionally made redware, micaceous clay storage jars and other smaller utilitarian forms. Margaret's father was primarily concerned with raising food for the family but he was also known to make pottery and helped Sara Fina with many aspects of her pottery production.

As a child, Tafoya started making small animals out of the clay that her parents had extracted from the Santa Clara land for Sara Fina's works. Showing promise, her mother encouraged young Margaret to make her own pottery and taught her how to knead the clay and polish shaped pots, as well as where to gather fuel for the firing process. Sara Fina allowed Margaret to sell her first pottery to a dealer in Santa Fe, although Margaret did not recall how much money she made that day. But the act of selling her work gave her confidence to continue making pottery.

== Career ==
For several years, Margaret worked as a cook and a waitress before she married Alcario Tafoya (1900–1995) in 1924. Alcario, a distant relative with the same last name, and Margaret worked together making pottery just as her mother and father had done. Margaret and Sara Fina's husbands both helped with the tasks of digging and preparing the clay and the firing of the pots. Alcario also helped Margaret with the creation and carving of designs on her pots.

Early in her career, Margaret often traded pottery for children's clothing or other household necessities to support her growing family. In the 1930s and 1940s, the Tafoyas would frequently load Margaret's pots into a horse-drawn wagon and travel hundreds of miles to Santa Fe and Taos to sell the works to tourists and traders. Tafoya also began selling her works at Indian art fairs such as the Santa Fe Indian Market and the Inter-Tribal Ceremonial at Gallup. In the 1950s, as interest in Native American art grew, the public would travel to the pueblos as tourists as well as to buy artistic goods, so the family didn't have to travel as far to sell their wares. During this time period, the Tafoyas befriended the owner of a resort in Royal Gorge, Colorado who hired them for summer residencies to perform ceremonial dances and sell their pottery to guests.

By the 1960s Margaret's pottery had become famous, particularly her large black jars. Margaret continued her mother's tradition of making these exceptionally large pots, with finely polished surfaces and simple carved designs. "Measuring as high as three feet, these vessels took months to mold and polish. They also required an enormous amount of technical skill, particularly to keep them from breaking while being fired". The labor-intensive techniques meant that Tafoya usually made only one large pot per year. Her "bear paw" motif and deeply carved pueblo symbols like the Avanyu (water serpent) and kiva steps around the shoulder of her jars have become signature trademarks of the Tafoya family pottery.

Like her mother, Margaret molded her pots using the traditional coiling method. "This method and many of the techniques used in the production of her pottery has been dated as being as more than 1200 years old, with the ancient "Anasazi" of the Colorado Plateau being the founding culture. A common misconception was the belief that black on black, burnished pueblo pottery had "died out," according to Larry Frank and Francis H. Harlow.

Tafoya's work "reflected the transformation of the Santa Clara pottery tradition from the utilitarian to the artistic".

== Retrospective exhibitions ==
- 1982: "Margaret Tafoya: A Potter's Heritage and Her Legacy" at the Denver Museum of Natural History, City Park, Colorado
- 1983: "The Red and the Black: Santa Clara Pottery by Margaret Tafoya" at the Wheelwright Museum of the American Indian, Santa Fe, New Mexico
- 2015–2016: "Margaret Tafoya: Santa Clara Pueblo Potter" at the Millicent Rogers Museum, El Prado, New Mexico

== Awards and honors ==
- In both 1978 and 1979, Tafoya received the Best of Show Award at the Santa Fe Indian Market.
- In 1984, the National Endowment for the Arts awarded her a National Heritage Fellowship in recognition of her accomplishments.
- She was recognized and received an award as a Master Traditional Artist in 1985.
- Also in 1985, she received the New Mexico Governor's Excellence in the Arts Award.
- She was inducted into the American Craft Council College of Fellows in 1990.
- In 1992, she received an Honor Award for Outstanding Achievement in the Visual Arts from the national Women's Caucus for Art.
- Her works were displayed on the National Mall in Washington, D.C. at the 1992 Smithsonian Folklife Festival.
- In 1996, Tafoya received a Lifetime Achievement Award from the Southwestern Association of Indian Arts.
- She received a Master Artist Award from the Heard Museum in Phoenix, Arizona (exact year unknown).
- Tafoya is the only Native American ever awarded a Lifetime Contribution Award by the National Academy of Western Art at the Cowboy Hall of Fame and Western Heritage Center in Oklahoma City (year of award unknown).

== Legacy ==
Margaret and her husband Alcario raised thirteen children. At the time of her death in February 2001, Margaret had 30 grandchildren, 45 great-grandchildren, and 11 great-great-grandchildren. Many of her descendants are carrying on the Tafoya family tradition of pottery making, including: Toni Roller, Jeff Roller, LuAnn Tafoya, Chris Youngblood, Nancy Youngblood, Nathan Youngblood, Darryl Whitegeese, Ryan Roller, Cliff Roller, Tim Roller, Tyler Roller, Jordan Roller, James Ebelacker, Sarena Ebelacker, Jamelyn Ebelacker, and Tammy Garcia.

== See also ==
- Black-on-black ware
- Pueblo pottery
