= Awanyu =

God of water in the Native American Tewa tribal mythology

Avanyu Awanyu
- Guardian of water
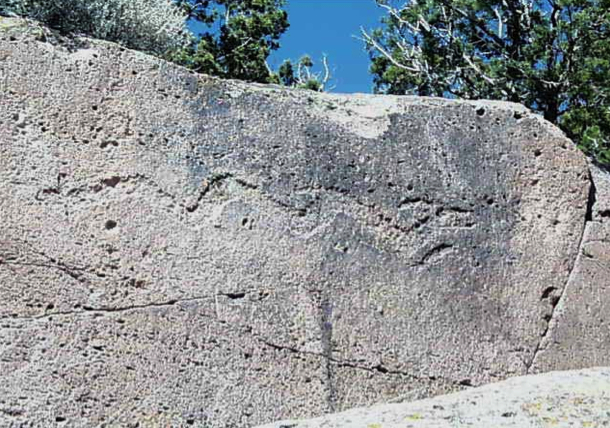
- Rock art at Tsirege depicting Awanyu.
- Abode: Rio Grande
- Symbol: plumed serpent

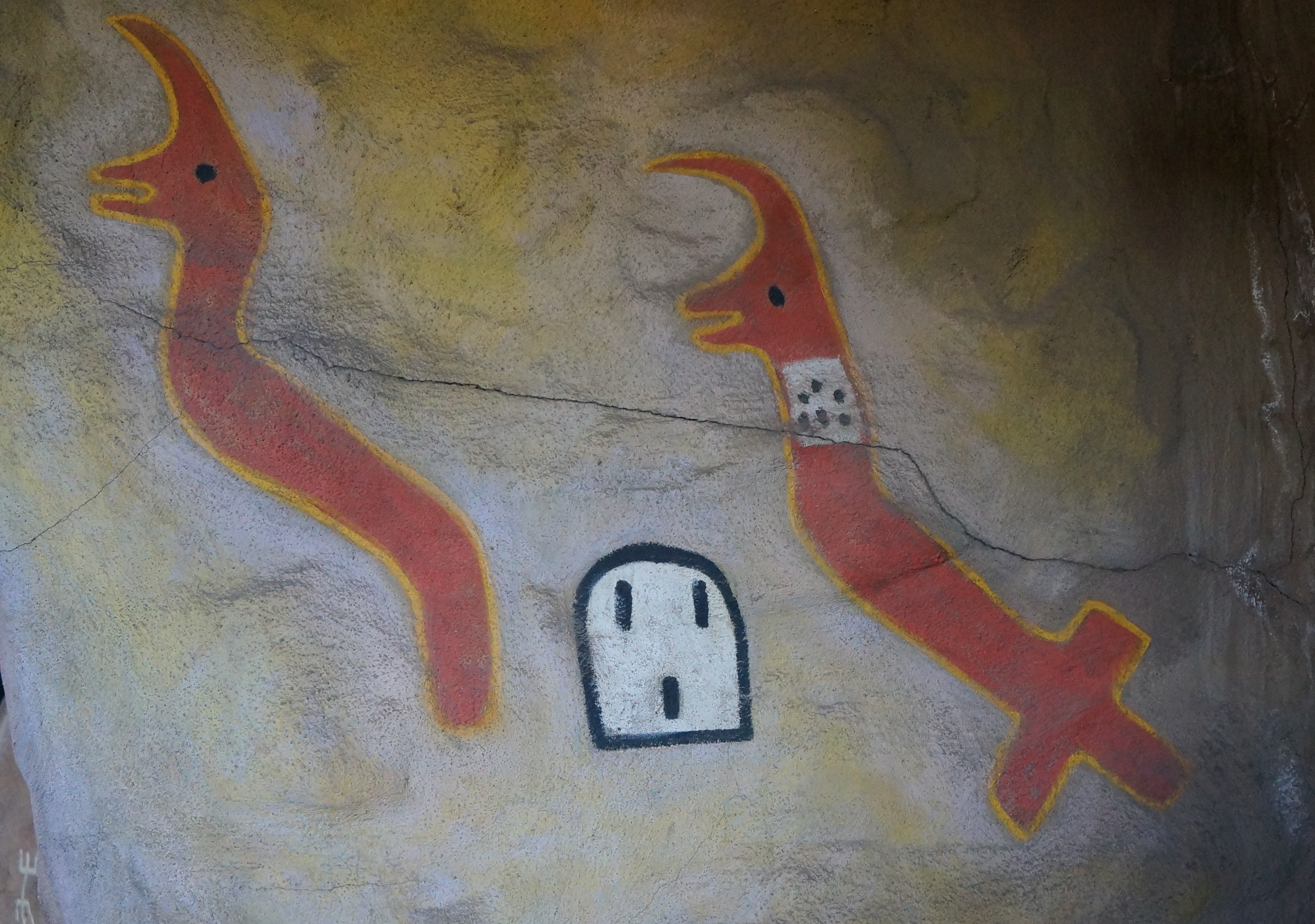
Awanyu painted by Fred Kabotie at Desert View Watchtower

Awanyu or Avanyu is a water guardian and a deity of the Tewa people. Awanyu is depicted as a horned (or plumed) serpent with a sinuous body suggestive of the flow of water or the zigzag of lightning. Frequently, the Tewa emplaced Awanyu icons on cave walls situated high above canyon rivers in New Mexico and Arizona. Awanyu may be related to the associated deities of Quetzalcoatl, the feathered serpent of Mesoamerica. Awanyu is a frequent motif on Native American pottery from the Southwestern United States.

Maria Martinez black-on-black ware plate (1961) and pot (1975), both with Awanyu motif

Awanyu is a protector of the Pueblo people, the guardian of waterways and a harbinger of storms, and represented as a plumed (or horned) serpent.

The earliest representations of Avanyu are from 1000 AD. These were found on Mimbres pottery, a precursor to Pueblo pottery. In the Mogollon and Casa Grande districts images of Avanyu appear between 1200 and 1450 AD. Avanyu appears in Tewa and Tiwa speaking peoples areas around 1350 AD.

Archaeologist Dr. Polly Schaafsma, whose research specializes in Avanyu mythology among other subjects, writes, “The horned serpent continues to be revered as an important deity among the Pueblos and is known by various names among the different linguistic groups, including Kolowisi (Zuni), Paaloloqangw (Hopi), and Awanyu (Tewa)." She goes on to write that Avanyu is also "associated with the four (or six) directions, the colors of which the snakes also assume." Schaafsma notes that the water serpent's home is located in "springs, ponds, rivers, and ultimately the oceans, all believed to be connected under the earth’s surface, and … may cause torrential rains and floods.”

== See also ==
- Horned Serpent
- Kukulkan
- The Great Serpent
