= Tewa =

Ethnic group of Pueblo Native Americans

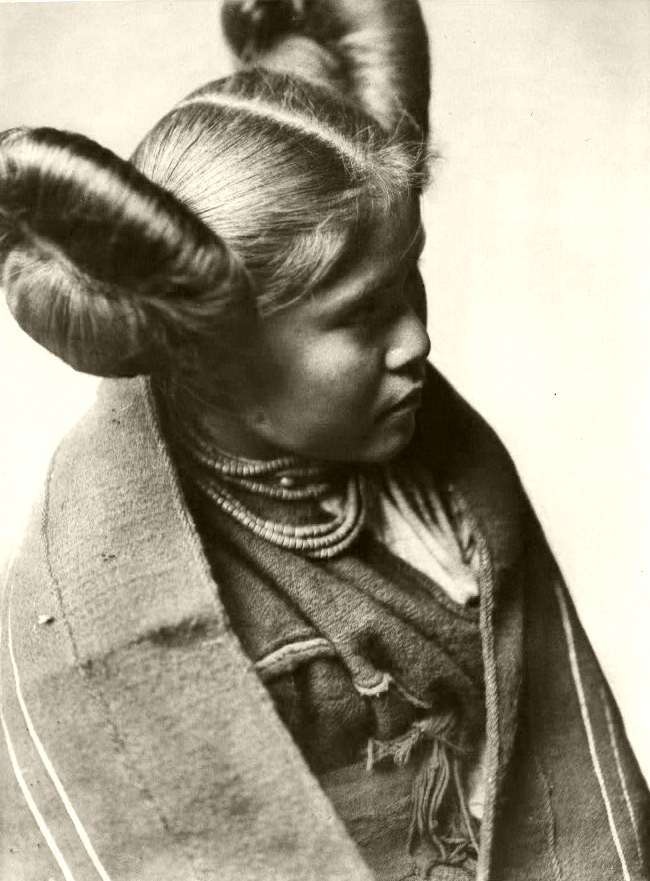
Chaiwa, a Tewa girl with a butterfly whorl hairstyle, photographed by Edward S. Curtis in 1922

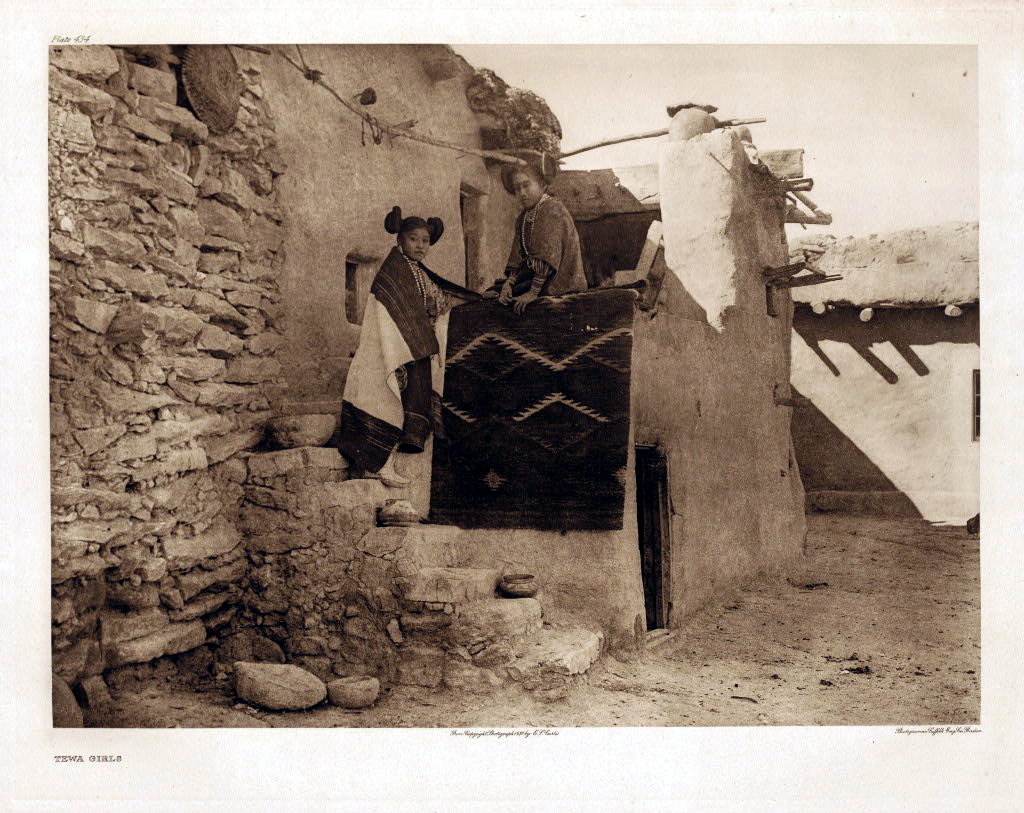
Tewa girls, 1922, photographed by Edward S. Curtis

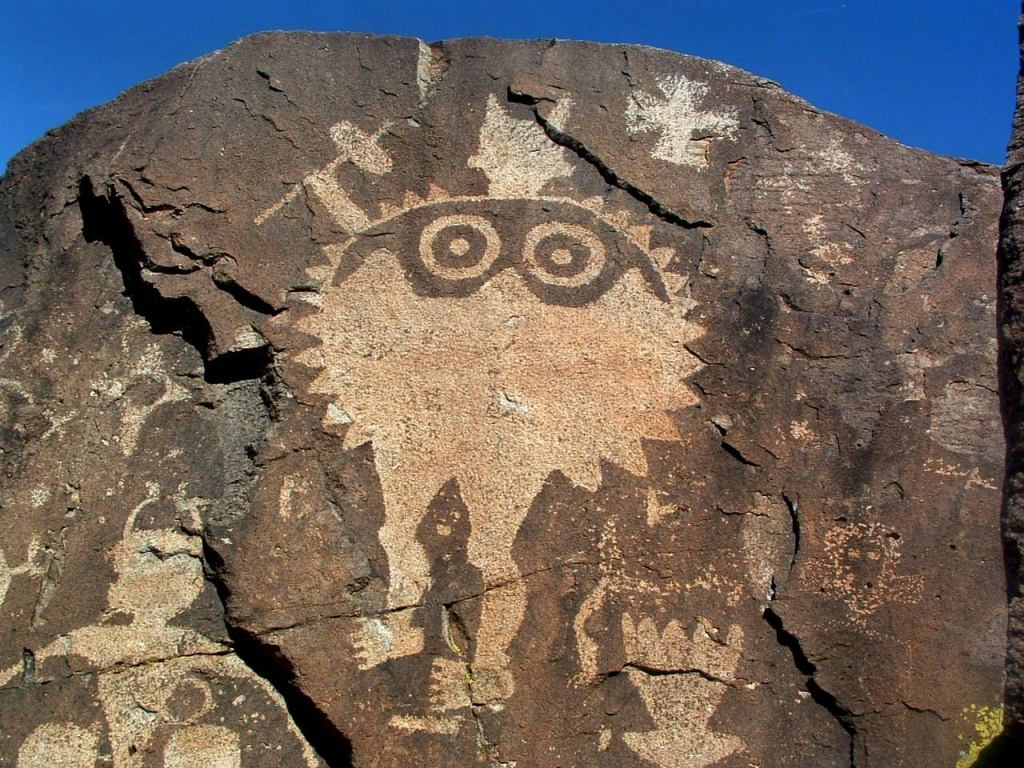
A Southern Tewa (Tano) anthropomorphic figure with rattle, petroglyph in the Galisteo Basin, a major Tano homeland prior to the Pueblo Revolt of 1680

The Tewa are an ethnolinguistic group of Pueblo Native Americans who speak the Tewa language and share Pueblo culture. Their homelands are on or near the Rio Grande in New Mexico north of Santa Fe. They comprise the following communities:

- Nambé Pueblo
- Ohkay Owingeh
- Pojoaque Pueblo
- San Ildefonso Pueblo
- Santa Clara Pueblo
- Tesuque Pueblo

The Hopi Tewa, descendants of Tewa who fled the Second Pueblo Revolt of 1680–1692, live on the Hopi Reservation in Arizona, mostly in Tewa Village and Polacca on First Mesa. Other Hopi clans are known to be descendants of Tewa people.

Tewa is one of five Tanoan languages spoken by the Pueblo people of New Mexico. Though these five languages are closely related, speakers of one cannot fully understand speakers of another (similar to German and Dutch speakers).

== History ==
=== Origin ===
The Tewa language is part of the Kiowa-Tanoan language family, of which other members include the Towa and Tiwa people as well as the nomadic Kiowa.

Tewa oral history describes their emergence from inside the earth at Sip’opheh, identified with San Luis Lake, (also known as Okhа̨ngep’oekwingeh, transl. 'sandy lake place') an endorheic salt lake at the Great Sand Dunes in modern Colorado. The Hunt Chief was the first to travel to the outer world, while the Towa’e identified the surrounding cardinal mountains. After several attempts to leave the lake, the Tewa finally succeeded and traveled southward, with the Winter Moiety traveling along the east side of a river and the Summer Moiety traveling along the west before unifying at a shared settlement in the Tewa Basin.

A narrative recorded by Harrington described early Tewa habitation in the Montezuma Valley, where the K'ósa clown society was founded. The ancient Tewa homeland in the north is known as Tewayógeh transl. 'great Tewa place', a name which also refers to their modern homeland. Records by Fray Alonso de Posada describe the location of "Teguayo", which the Spanish conflated with the legendary city of Copala and Utah Lake, as far to the northwest beyond the San Juan River. Further exploration by the Spanish identified the area of Mesa Verde as corresponding to Teguayo. At least one Tewa oral history describes Yucca House as a former Tewa settlement. Under the Mesa Verde model of Tewa origin described below, the identification of Sip’opheh with San Luis Lake is ascribed to a transposition of traditional narratives following the migration from Mesa Verde.

=== Hypothesized connection to Mesa Verde ===
According to Scott Ortman, multiple lines of evidence suggest that the modern Tewa originated from a long-distance colonization in the 13th century by the Ancestral Puebloan inhabitants of Mesa Verde and the surrounding area in Colorado. However, this finding has been contested.

According to Ortman, the Tewa Basin was inhabited prior to the decline of Mesa Verde in the 13th century, likely by the Tiwa, and earlier archaeological sites in the Tewa Basin share commonalities with those in the Taos Valley. Increased land pressure and the abandonment of settlements at Mesa Verde, marked by ritually burnt kivas and increasing violence, began in the 1225-1260 period and was complete by 1280, corresponding precisely to a fourfold increase in population of the Tewa Basin and the foundation of hundreds of new settlements. New settlements in the Tewa Basin began with small pioneer hamlets prior to 1200 CE in the lightly inhabited Pajarito Plateau, with a concurrent rise of Pajarito/Cerro Toledo obsidian products at Mesa Verde suggestion connection between the two regions. Villages formed on the plateau by 1275, and towns were present across the basin by 1275-1350 CE, suggesting a model of increasing in-migration and consolidation as immigrants arrived in larger groups. Kivas at the first hamlets exhibited some characteristics of San Juan Basin architecture, while consolidated settlements adopted existing Tewa Basin architectural and ceramic traditions while innovating a new plaza-centric organization that echoed the great houses of Mesa Verde's social elite. These new settlements carried a package of practices present at Mesa Verde but not found in the pre-13th century Tewa Basin, including direct precipitation agriculture, turkey domestication, and carbon-painted pottery. Shrine systems in place by the 14th century likewise bear notable similarities to some late Mesa Verde sites in the use of directional features following cardinal directions.

Ortman further argues that certain linguistic-archaeological metaphors linking pottery vessels and the kiva to woven baskets, buildings to containers, and communities to serving bowls are apparent in both the Tewa language and Mesa Verde architectural design. Material evidence for continuity between Mesa Verde and the Tewa has traditionally been contested, as pottery at the Pajarito Plateau generally matched local trends and materials, but shards at Tsama Pueblo, which was founded by a large group in an otherwise uninhabited region around the time of Mesa Verde's final abandonment, include simplified versions of Mesa Verde weaving motifs. Ortman interprets the Pajarito settlers as a pioneer society who carried a package of Mesa Verde traits but were willing, even eager, to abandon the traditions of their homeland, while speculating that the inhabitants of Tsama were later migrants who briefly retained a greater connection to their traditional ways. Under this model, the lack of architectural and material continuity and apparent rejection of Mesa Verde traditions reflects a conscious decision to erase the traditions of a troubled past, perhaps suggesting a social and religious revolution resulting in the ethnogenesis of today's Tewa. This intentional obliviation may be visible in the smearing away of woven imagery on pottery and the development of the plaza pueblo.

Ortman claims genomic and phenotypic trait data from remains suggest a closer affinity between the Tewa and the last inhabitants of Mesa Verde than between the Tewa and the pre-13th century population of the Tewa Basin. Nonetheless, there is evidence of genomic contribution under this model from the pre-13th century population, whose material, pottery, and architectural traditions were in several respects retained or adopted by the immigrants. Michael Schillaci contests this, arguing that the biological evidence does not suggest continuity between Mesa Verde and the Tewa and may have been confounded by small sample sizes. According to Schillaci, there is no evidence of large gene flow into the Tewa Basin, with admixture data instead favoring Mesa Verde migration to the Albuquerque area and the Keres at Cochiti. Genomic data likewise indicates Mesa Verde contribution to Tewa, Towa, and Keres populations, as well as Chaco Canyon contribution to the Tewa. Schillaci interprets this result as indicating a pan-Puebloan diaspora from Mesa Verde, rather than long distance colonization.

=== Precolonial era ===
After 1300 CE, settlements in the Pajarito Plateau coalesced, with a rectilinear plan and central plazas predominating. Tewa settlements expanded to Ojo Caliente and the Galisteo Basin. Some religious shrine structures characteristic of Tewa sites have been found near Pot Creek Pueblo, suggesting that a group of Tewa migrants may have lived with the Tiwa of this village. This relationship is reflected in Taos and Picuris oral narratives.

=== Spanish era ===
In 1598, the conquistador Juan de Oñate established the capital of Spanish New Mexico at Yúngéh, a Tewa village located across the river from Ohkay Owingeh. Later, the capital was moved to Ohkay, which the Spanish called San Juan Pueblo. From then on, Oñate and his other men subjected the Tewa and other native peoples to harsh conditions and rule, forcing them to adopt Catholicism and establishing missions in all the pueblos. In 1609, the Spanish capital was moved again to Santa Fe, which has remained the capital of New Mexico. The previous colonial governor, Juan de Oñate, stepped down and was replaced by Pedro de Peralta.

The Pueblo people resented the oppressive rule of the Spanish, and` following his 1675 arrest for "witchcraft", Ohkay leader Po'pay successfully organized the Pueblo Revolt in 1680. During the uprising, the Tewa and other Pueblos slew their imposed priests, destroyed the churches, and besieged Santa Fe, eventually forcing the Spanish to retreat to El Paso del Norte. In the wake of the revolution, the Tewa destroyed Spanish items, rebuilt their kivas, and broadly returned to their pre-colonial traditions.

In 1692, Diego de Vargas returned to reoccupy of the Pueblos, retaking Santa Fe in 1694. A second revolt occurred in 1696, but was crushed by Spanish officials and the military. An increase in Apache and Navajo raids for food and captives led the Pueblos to take advantage of the protection of the Spanish military.

=== United States ===
When Mexico gained independence from Spain in 1821, Christianized Indians were given citizenship. In 1858, when the United States gained New Mexico and other Southwestern regions, the Treaty of Guadalupe Hidalgo (which gave the U.S. the previously mentioned territories) promised citizenship to all Mexican citizens who wanted it, including the Pueblos and the Tewa.

In 1912, the Pueblo of San Juan sued the U.S. government to secure their status as American Indians, which would subsequently secure the native land and water rights and protect their religious and individual rights. Later, Hispano and Anglo-Americans moved into Pueblo lands where Tewa Pueblos lost many agricultural areas due to urban expansion to account for the new population size. In 1920, the United States established the Pueblo Lands Board to settle disputed claims between the government and the Tewa. Eventually, the Tewa gained full citizenship status while retaining their previous rights to land, water, and religious expression secured through litigation in federal courts.

== Geography ==
The Tewa inhabit a region known as the Tewa Basin (Tewà Nа̨ngeh, Tewà Búugeh), a Y-shaped drainage centered around the Rio Grande north of Caja del Rio and south of Embudo, bounded by the Jemez and Sangre de Cristo Mountains. Ancestral Tewa pueblos extended up the Chama River as far as Abiquiú. A historic population of Tewa speakers known as the Tano inhabited the Galisteo Basin prior to the Pueblo Revolt, after which some dispersed into neighboring pueblos while others moved to the Santa Cruz River near Chimayo before migrating to the Hopi at First Mesa in 1696.

Like other Pueblo peoples as well as some Southern Athabaskan peoples, the Tewa recognize four sacred mountains in each cardinal direction, defining their traditional territory. These are Lake Peak (Agachą̈nu Pʼin, east), Sandia Peak (Oekuu Pʼin, south), Chicoma Mountain (Tsikumu Pʼin, west), and San Antonio Mountain (Kay Pʼin, north).

== Culture ==
=== Language ===
As with speakers of Tiwa, Towa and Keres, there is some disagreement among the Tewa people as to whether Tewa should be a written language or not. Some Pueblo elders feel that Tewa languages should be preserved by oral traditions alone. However, many Tewa speakers have decided that Tewa literacy is important for passing the language on to the children.

The Tewa pueblos have developed their own orthography (spelling system) for their language and Ohkay Owingeh has published a dictionary of Tewa. Today most of the Tewa-speaking pueblos have established Tewa-language programs to teach children to read and write in the language.

=== Religion ===
The Tewa possesses polytheist beliefs regarding supernatural spiritual force and entities.

Tewa spiritual traditions place a substantial emphasis on landscape orientation, ordering the world along four concentric features. Pueblos are conceived as lying at the center of the world, or "Earth-mother earth-navel middle place", and are marked by an upright stone in the central plaza. The pueblo is in turn surrounded by a ring of upright stones where the Tewa pray to the souls of the departed, flat-topped hills where Towa’e guardian spirits watch over the pueblo, and, at the outermost ring, four sacred mountains in each cardinal direction. These cardinal mountains are adorned with keyhole-shaped stone arrangements whose openings point towards the pueblo, which the Tewa believe channel blessings and spiritual power to the settlement. Historically, similar shrines were also constructed on the cardinal hills, and an earth navel or "world quarter" shrine was represented by a large, east-facing shrine at the top of a low hill adjacent to the pueblo.

Many elements of traditional Tewa religion are considered sensitive and not shared with outsiders. Religious sodality leaders know more details of their respective systems of belief. Some sodality environments or of worship could include:

- Respect and Reverence to the Earth (where everyone is born)
- The Mountains (where spirits of the Towa’e are found)
- The Hills
- The Water
- Certain Animals, Birds, and Plants

Catholicism has been seamlessly applied to the tribe.

==== Moieties ====
Tewa kinship divides all Tewa into two moieties, the Summer People and Winter People. The two moieties are each led by chiefs and traditionally have differing subsistence and ceremonial roles through the year. The Summer Chief governs in the summer and presides over farming and entreating rainfall, while the Winter Chief governs in winter and leads hunting and the winter's ceremonial activities. Responsibilities between the two chiefs historically changed at the equinoxes, but today the Summer Chief has a longer period of responsibility. The two moieties historically lived broadly separately in roomblocks on opposite sides of the pueblo's central plaza.

==== Deities ====
- 'Agojo so'jo (Tewa: Agóyó sóˀyó, 'Big star'), a god that represents the morning star, associated with warfare.
- Ponu'chona, a deity of Hopi-Tewa, identified with the morning star, associated with animals and hunting.

An important cultural hero of the Tewa is P’oseyemu (lit. 'mist scattering'). Born poor and with no name, P’oseyemu confronted traditional religious figures and decried their leadership, gathering followers and founding the K’ósa Society, and eventually leading the Tewa from Tewayó to their current location in the Tewa Basin. Some oral histories report that he was born at P’osí Ówîngeh. Under the Mesa Verde hypothesis, Ortman speculates that P’oseyemu has roots in the social upheaval and societal reorganization surrounding the migration of the Tewa from Mesa Verde. P’oseyemu was likewise invoked by the rebels during the Pueblo Revolt.

=== Childhood ===
From a very young age, the Tewa tribe would create or introduce individuals to progress through stages, the last regarding becoming a “Tewa.” From birth, children are tribal members and are raised tolerantly. When the children are ten, the boys and girls are split into two groups to learn about their roles in the community. If the children’s families are primarily Catholic, the children will also attend their First Communion.

Today, rather than splitting children by gender for instruction in kivas, tribal leaders encourage youths to strive for higher education. This idea is promoted through educational grants and subsidies to private or public colleges via the Eight Northern Indian Pueblos Council. Parents are still held accountable for their children, and all reside in their respective communities.

=== Gender roles ===
Women were traditionally in charge of the household and held responsible for building and maintaining them until the mid-1970s. They also gathered and processed plants and prepared food. Men were expected to plant, tend, and harvest crops as well as hunt in the surrounding forests and meadows.

=== Marriage ===
Marriage inside the tribe was primarily arranged through negotiation between the families and was usually accompanied by the exchange of gifts. The marriage ceremony included a variety of expectations. Usually, it included a native (but might have also included) a nonnative ritual. Inside the community, marriage is monogamous and sexual fidelity is an expectation between the two, although divorce and infidelity have been observed. After marriage, the families would usher the couple to stay in the husband’s mother’s home, where, after the first year, the couple would establish a permanent home inside the community.

=== Land ownership ===
Pueblo members are assigned a piece of land, but the land ultimately belongs to the Pueblo. Once a person passes away, their children can be given the land as an “inheritance.” While land trade is allowed among Tewa tribal members, tribal members are not allowed to trade land with non-tribal members.

== Economy ==
=== Commercial Economy ===
The Tewa are traditionally agriculturalists, using irrigation to sustain and grow maize, beans, and squash. While members of the Tewa hunted herds of deer, bison, and elk while gathering berries and nuts, they were predominantly not nomadic and preferred to settle in an area and farm. They were also proficient at crushing plants to make medicinal teas.

Through the early colonization of Spain in their settlements, the Tewa were introduced to a variety of new animals, including cows, pigs, and chickens, as well as to new crops such as wheat, tomatoes, apples, pears, peaches, and chili. Iron kettles and pots was readily accepted as a means of cooking, while traditional pottery continued as a means of storage and dishes.

Before Spanish colonization, like many other indigenous people in the U.S., the Tewa traded pottery, jewelry and woven goods. Since the development of the Pueblo Lands Board, most Tewa depend on wage labor, Social Security, or other pensions for their income.

=== Arts ===
The primary forms of art among the Tewa are pottery, weaving, and woodcarving. Of these, the most influential is pottery, which the Tewa use for storage, eating, cooking, and trading. Cotton and hides from the animals hunted by the Tewa (which included deer, rabbits, and others) were made into clothing and shoes. After a decline in the development of pottery in the economy, the rise of the commercial revolution, especially during the 18th and 19th centuries, revived this craft, and today, needlework, pottery, jewelry, and woven garments make up a substantial portion of the modern-day Tewa economy.

=== Trade ===
The Tewa developed an extensive trade network with the surrounding Mesa Verde and Rio Grande region. Tewa trade reached as far as California, central Mexico, the Mississippi Valley, the eastern Great Plains, and the Great Basin. This trade network continued through the twentieth century, including basketry from the Apache and Tohono O'odham and feathers, shells, and beads from Mexico. Through markets like the Santa Fe Indian Market and shows like the Northern Indian Pueblos Arts and Crafts Show, trade continues to increase.

== Demographics ==
=== Population ===
Analyzing the archaeological record, Ortman found that the Tewa Basin population quadrupled between CE 1200 and 1350, likely due to migration from the Mesa Verde region. This expansion began with new settlement on the Pajarito Plateau before expanding across the basin, with the population stabilizing at close to 20,000 inhabitants. Following the Spanish entrada, the Tewa population exponentially declined.

In 1630, Fray Alonso de Benavides reported eight Tewa pueblos with a total population as high as 6,000. In other reports, about 2,200 Tewa were living in the six New Mexico pueblos, which might not include the other two pueblos mentioned by Fray Alonso.

In 1988, the U.S. took a demographic census concerning Native American populations in New Mexico, and the number of Native Americans on New Mexico's Tewa reservations was 4,546. In sections of pueblos:

- San Juan Pueblo - 1,936
- Santa Clara Pueblo - 1,253
- San Ildefonso Pueblo - 556
- Nambé Pueblo - 396
- Tesuque Pueblo - 329
- Pojoaque Pueblo - 76

Compared to the 1975 population of 625 Hopi-Tewa at Hano, Native American development over time had increased. In retrospect, most Tewa lives on or near their home pueblo, but they slowly moved towards more urban communities.

In a 1991 census, a new record of the population of Tewa and the number of speakers of the Tewa language was documented. In terms of the Pueblo population:

- Ohkay Owingeh Pueblo - 1,438
- Santa Clara Pueblo - 1,057
- Nambé Pueblo - 558
- San Ildefonso Pueblo - 539
- Tesuque Pueblo - 511
- Pojoaque Pueblo - 209

The demographic of how many people speak the Tewa language was as follows:

- Ohkay Owingeh Pueblo - 495
- Santa Clara Pueblo - 207
- Nambé Pueblo - 50
- San Ildefonso Pueblo - 349
- Tesuque Pueblo - 172
- Pojoaque Pueblo - 25

Today, hundreds of these Pueblo ruins in New Mexico have been identified and marked as ancestral sites for the complementary Rio Grande Pueblos; in historical times, at least sixty of them were abandoned. Since most of these sites weren’t investigated, they can't be directly traced to early Tewa origins. However, through DNA analysis, scientists were recently able to trace the early DNA of domesticated turkeys that lived inside the Tewa settlements. They discovered that DNA samples taken from the Tewa's site in Colorado's Mesa Verde are similar to those from the Northern Rio Grande region, where the tribe is settled today. The Mesa Verde region was a hub for Southwestern Puebloan society in the 13th century, but following a severe drought in 1277, the tribe's economy and social relations crashed. This drought explains why the Tewa had early traces in the Mesa Verde region but was discovered by the Spanish in the northern Rio Grande region.

=== Population Density ===
Between the arrival of the Spanish and the early 1900s, population densities within the pueblos fluctuated but also included times of decline. This could be because of diseases introduced by the Spanish, warfare, or even the abandonment of villages because of the Tewa's desire to escape European expansion and oppression.

But, population density for the Tewa Pueblos began to slowly rise in the 1900s following the establishment of the Pueblo Lands Board. Between 1950 and 1964, the population in all six main Tewa pueblos almost doubled. Maternal and infant mortality rates were reduced through better health care inside the communities and improved nutrition (due to increased job opportunities), also contributing to lower mortality rates.

== Notable people ==
- Maria Martinez, a famous potter known for black-on-black ware
- Po'pay, Pueblo Revolt leader
- Esther Martinez, a Tewa linguist
- Rose Naranjo, potter, ceramicist and matriarch of the Naranjo arts family
- Jody Naranjo, potter
- Rose Gonzales, potter
- Jacob Koopee Jr., potter
