= Amy Goldstein =

American filmmaker

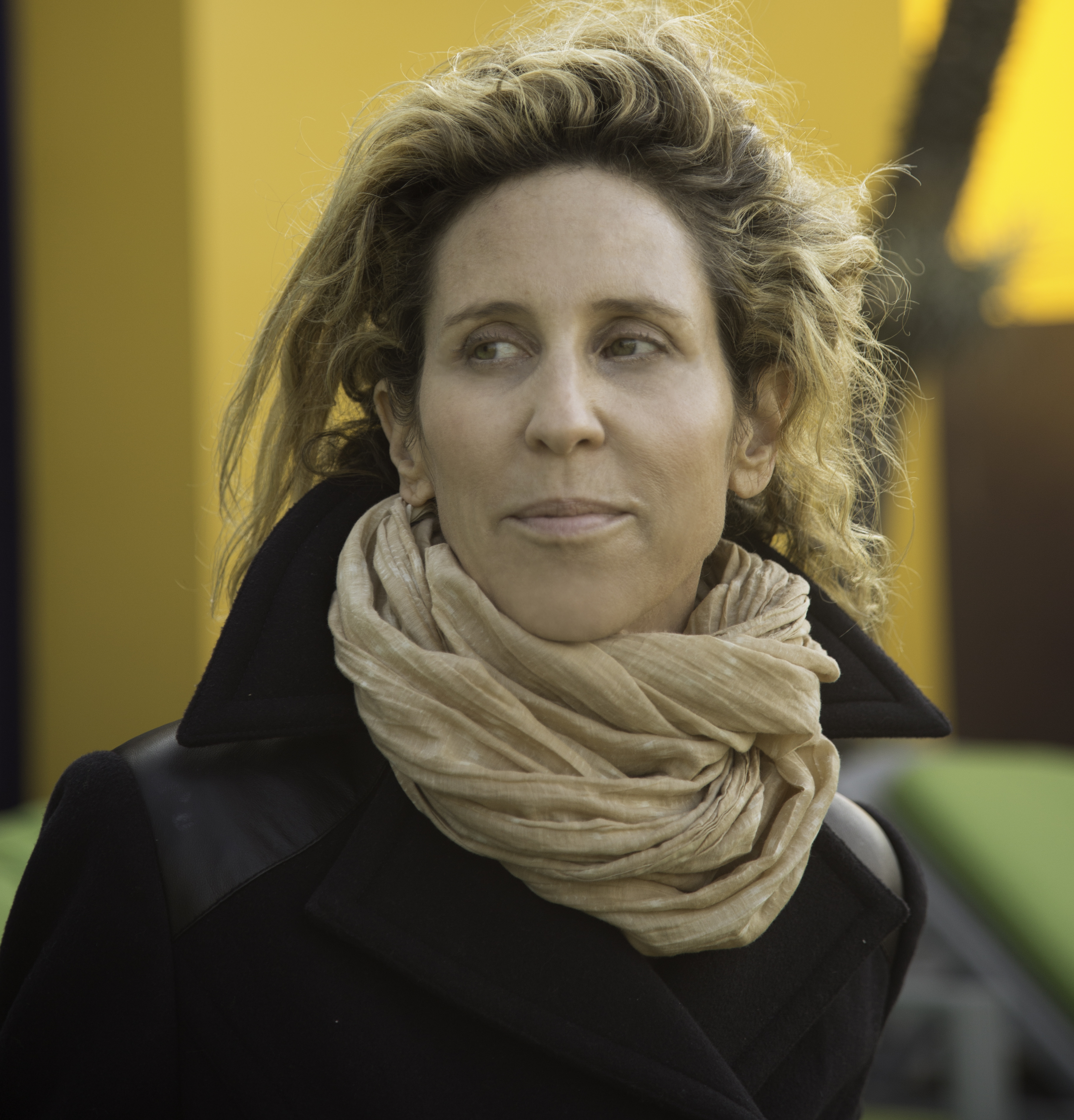
- Born: Amy Barbara Goldstein; Miami, Florida
- Education: Hampshire College (BA); New York University (MFA)
- Occupations: Owner Span Productions, film director, producer, screenwriter
- Years active: 1986-present

Amy Goldstein is an American director, producer and screenwriter of music videos, television series (HBO, Fox, CBS, Showtime, MTV), and feature films. Her work has been presented at film festivals worldwide.

== Career ==
Amy Goldstein graduated a Louis B. Mayer fellow from NYU film school. Goldstein has directed music videos for artists worldwide, including Rod Stewart’s "Downtown Train" Her lesbian vampire musical, Because The Dawn, premiered at the Toronto Film Festival in 1988. With Scott Kraft she co-wrote and directed the feature film, The Silencer, for Crown International Pictures.

In 2000, Goldstein directed the award-winning feature film East of A about an alternative family facing the challenges of raising a child with HIV. Amy writes for television and film, including pilots for HBO, CBS, Fox, Showtime and MTV, and a hip-hop musical for Polygram/Jersey Films. Her 2010 documentary film The Hooping Life is about the resurgence in hooping. In 2022, her documentary The Unmaking of a College about her alma mater Hampshire College premiered.

== Personal life ==
Based in Los Angeles, she is the sister of film critic and Los Angeles Times columnist Patrick Goldstein.

== Feature films ==
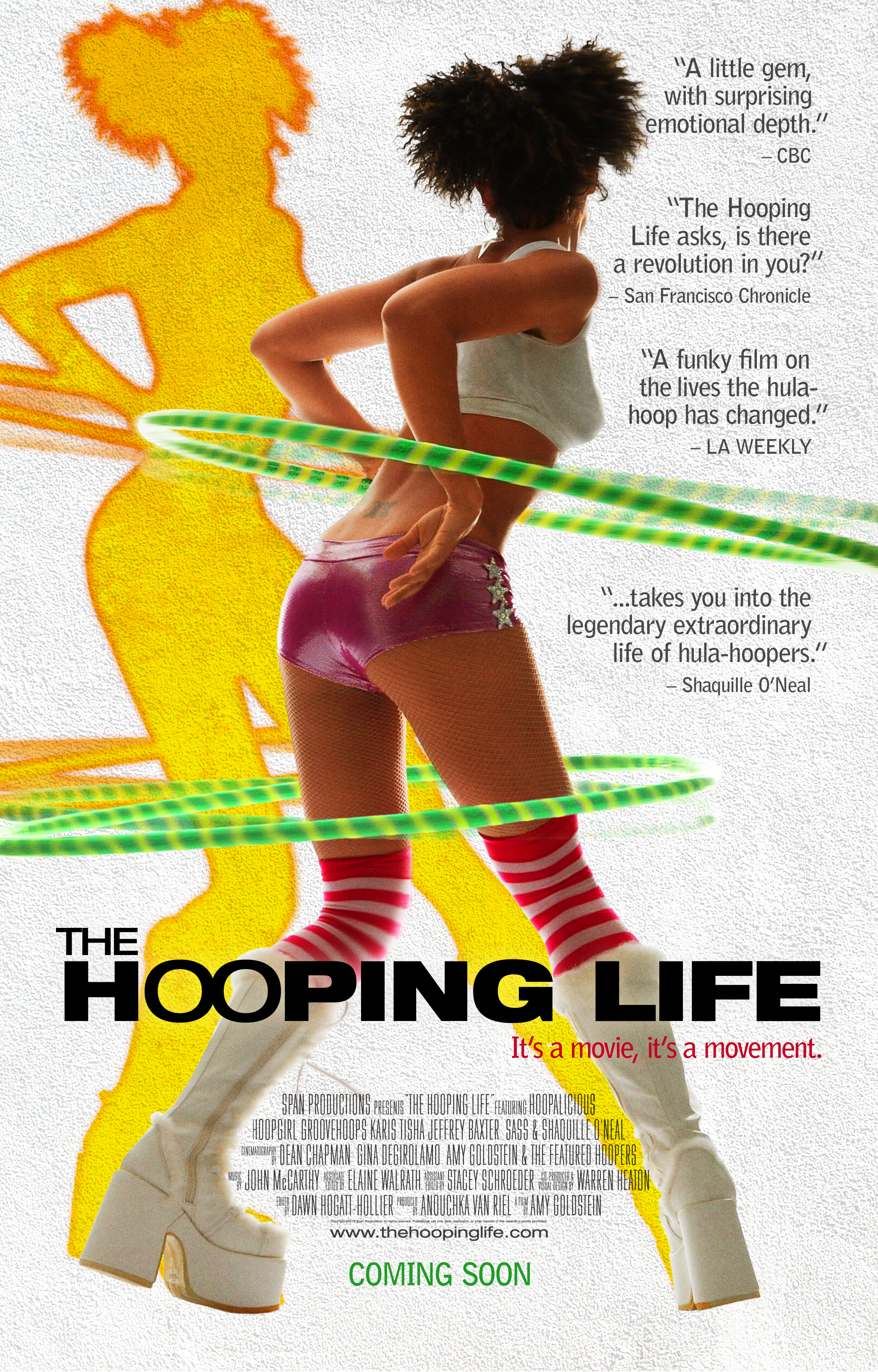
Promotional poster for The Hooping Life

- The Unmaking of a College (2022)
- Kate Nash: Underestimate The Girl (2018)
- The Hooping Life (2010)
- East of A, 2000
- Check Under The Hood (Script - Polygram/ Jersey Films)
- The Silencer, 1992
- Veronica Clare, 1991

== TV Pilots (Scripts) ==
- Zero Cool (Fox)
- Wildlife (CBS)
- No Man's Land (HBO)
- Boomerang Baby (MTV)

== Short films ==
- Because the Dawn, 1988
- Commercial for Murder, 1987
- Black Tie, 1986

== Music videos ==
- 2014 Basement Jaxx, The Hooping Life
- Five music videos for Hong Kong singer and actress Anita Mui
- 1995 Rod Stewart, "This"
- 1990 Rod Stewart, "Downtown Train" #3 hit on the Billboard Hot 100, #1 hit on Canadian Singles Chart, #1 MTV.
- 1990 Kill for Thrills, “Commercial Suicide”

== Awards ==
- 2008 Recipient, HBO/DGA Directing Fellowship
- 2000 Winner, Burning Vision Award, Santa Barbara International Film Festival, for East of A
- 2000 Outstanding Director Feature Films, Laguna Beach Film Festival, for East of A
- 2000 Winner, Telluride Independent Film Festival, for East of A
- 2000 Best Feature, Rhode Island International Film Festival, for East of A

== Community involvement ==
- 1998 "For Our Families" PSA for The Human Rights Campaign's National Coming Out Project with Betty DeGeneres
- 1994-2003 Board of Directors, Outfest
