= World Championship Hoop Dance Contest =

Heard Museum (Phoenix, Arizona) competition

The World Championship Hoop Dance Contest is an annual American Indian and Canadian First Nations hoop dancing competition held at the Heard Museum in Phoenix, Arizona.

During the contest, dancers are scored based on their skills in precision, timing, showmanship, creativeness and speed. Competitors are allowed to use as many hoops as wanted during their dances, some using as few as four to as many as 50 hoops. The competition is divided into five categories, including Tiny Tots (age 5 and below), Youth (6–12), Teen (13–17), Adult (18–39) and Senior (40 and above). The dance is used as a way of self-expression and storytelling, including dancers spinning the hoops or transforming hoops into animal shapes.

The Championship began in 1991, originally created for the New Mexico State Fair by Ralph Zotigh and his son Dennis Zotigh. After the first competition was held, according to Dennis Zotigh, the contest was named the "Tony White Cloud Memorial World Championship Hoop Dance Contest" in honor of White Cloud "for his contributions in founding the modern Hoop Dance." In 1992, the competition was moved to the Heard Museum, where it continues to be held. In 2021, the event was held fully online for the first time in the competition's history.

== World Champions ==
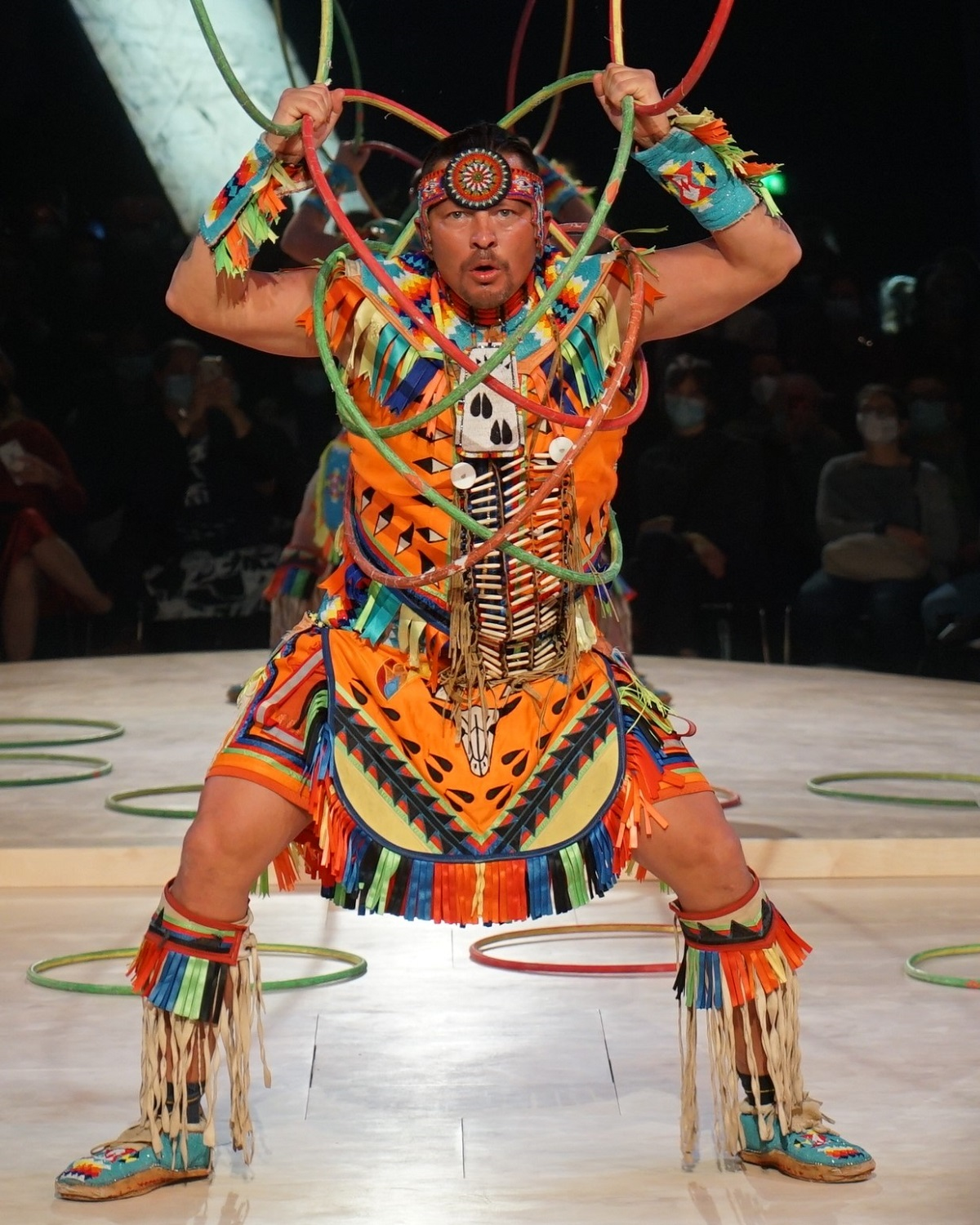
Dallas Arcand, World Champion 2006, 2007 and 2012

- 1991 Eddie Swimmer (Eastern Band Cherokee, Chippewa Cree)
- 1992 Quentin Pipestem (Tsuu Tina)
- 1993 Quentin Pipestem (Tsuu Tina)
- 1994 Derrick Suwaima Davis, (Hopi–Choctaw)
- 1995 Quentin Pipestem (Tsuu Tina)
- 1996 Derrick Suwaima Davis, (Hopi-Choctaw)
- 1997 Derrick Suwaima Davis, (Hopi-Choctaw)
- 1998 Derrick Suwaima Davis, (Hopi-Choctaw)
- 1999 Vincent Davis, (Hopi-Choctaw)
- 2000 Lisa Odjig (Odawa-Anishinaabe)
- 2001 Alex Wells (Lil'wat)
- 2002 Alex Wells (Lil'wat)
- 2003 Lisa Odjig (Odawa-Anishnaabe)
- 2004 Daniel Tramper (Eastern Band Cherokee)
- 2005 Alex Wells (Lil'wat)
- 2006 Dallas Arcand (Cree)
- 2007 Dallas Arcand (Cree)
- 2008 Charles Denny (Cree-Ute)
- 2009 Brian Hammill (Ho-Chunk)
- 2010 Derrick Suwaima Davis, (Hopi-Choctaw)
- 2011 Tony Duncan (Apache, Hidatsa, Arikara)
- 2012 Dallas Arcand (Cree)
- 2013 Derrick Suwaima Davis, (Hopi-Choctaw)
- 2014 Derrick Suwaima Davis, (Hopi-Choctaw)
- 2015 Nakotah LaRance (Hopi-Tewa, Assiniboine)
- 2016 Nakotah LaRance (Hopi-Tewa, Assiniboine)
- 2017 Tyrese Jensen (Navajo-Maricopa)
- 2018 Nakota LaRance (Hopi-Tewa, Assiniboine)
- 2019 Cody Boettner (Muscogee Creek)
- 2020 Scott Sixkiller-Sinquah, (Gila River Pima-Hopi)
- 2021 Tony Duncan, (San Carlos Apache, MHA Nations)
- 2022 Sampson Sixkiller Sinquah (Gila River Pima/Hopi-Tewa/Cherokee)
- 2023 Scott Sixkiller Sinquah (Gila River Pima/Hopi-Tewa/Cherokee/Choctaw)
- 2024 Josiah Enriquez (Pueblo of Pojoaque, Navajo, Isleta)
- 2025 Josiah Enriquez (Pueblo of Pojoaque, Navajo, Isleta)
