= Bennie Gonzales =

American architect (1924–2008)

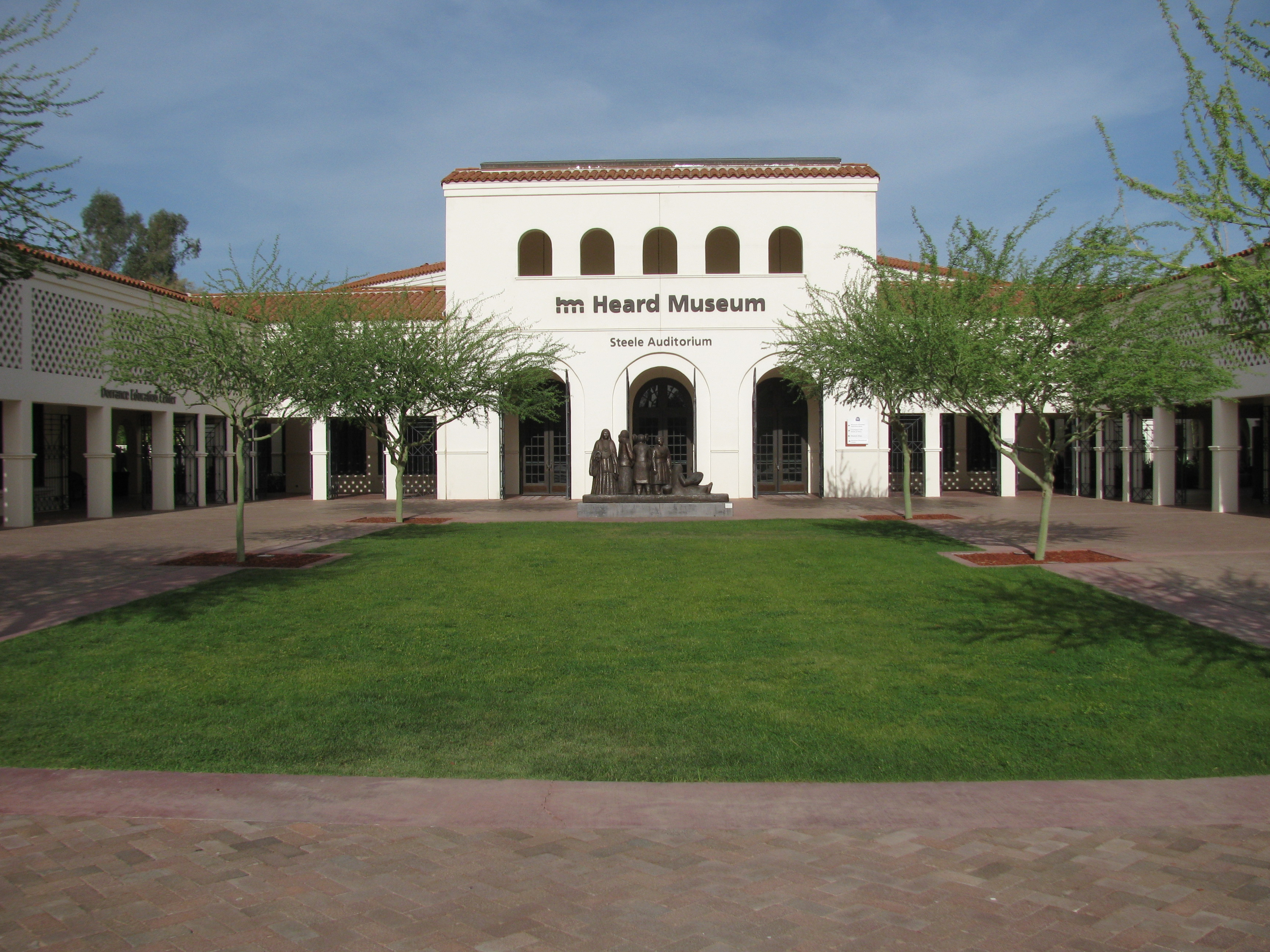
- The Heard Museum in Phoenix, designed by Gonzales.
- Born: June 11, 1924; Phoenix, Arizona
- Died: November 20, 2008 (aged 84); Nogales, Arizona
- Education: Arizona State University
- Occupations: Architect and building designer
- Employer: Gonzales Associates Architects
- Spouse(s): Lupe Baca, Diane Gonzales

Bennie M. Gonzales FAIA (June 11, 1924 – November 20, 2008) was an American architect known for a distinctive style of Southwestern architecture which has since been widely copied. Gonzales designed most of Scottsdale, Arizona's, major municipal buildings including Scottsdale City Hall, the Scottsdale Center for the Performing Arts and the Civic Center Library. His resume also included hundreds of private homes and residences throughout Arizona.

Examples of Gonzales's work can be found sprinkled across Arizona, the United States and the world. High-profile buildings designed by Gonzales include the Heard Museum in central Phoenix; the Cotton Hotel in Phoenix; the former Armour-Dial building on Scottsdale Road in Scottsdale; and two churches located in Paradise Valley, Arizona, – the Gloria Del Lutheran Church and the Christ Church of the Ascension.

Gonzales received 131 separate architectural design awards throughout his career, including several awards from the American Institute of Architects.

== Early life ==
He was born Barnaby Gonzales in Phoenix, Arizona, in 1924. As a child, Gonzales worked at his uncle's adobe brick factory, which produced building materials for the famed Arizona Biltmore Hotel. Gonzales credited Frank Lloyd Wright and Pablo Picasso as his heroes and he first saw architect Frank Lloyd Wright at the hotel when he was just 8 years old. The brief sighting of Wright made an impression on the young Gonzales, who decided to pursue a career in architecture.

Gonzales attended Phoenix Union High School. He enlisted in the United States Coast Guard during World War II. It was during his time in the Coast Guard that he earned the nickname "Bennie" when a military recruiter decided to call him that instead of his given name, Barnaby.

He returned to Arizona following the end of World War II and took a position as a Phoenix firefighter. Gonzales enrolled at Arizona State University's fledgling architecture degree program, eventually becoming one of the program's first two graduates. His one architecture classmate was Frank Henry, who now teaches at the Frank Lloyd Wright School of Architecture.

Gonzales also studied at the University of Mexico, where he took a particular interest in Mayan design and motifs.

== Career ==
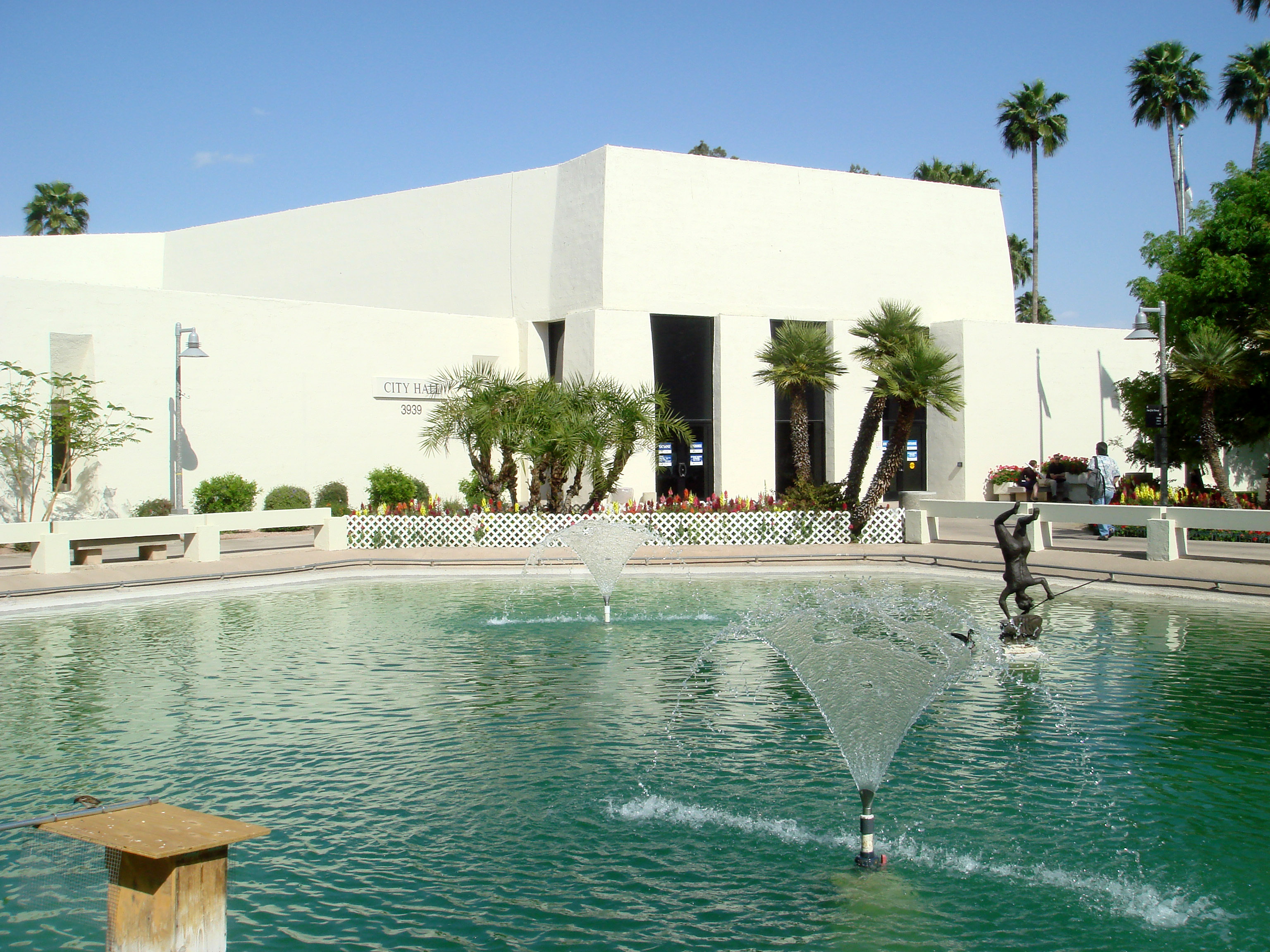
Scottsdale City Hall, which was designed by Bennie Gonzales.

A hallmark of Gonzales designs was his minimizing of right angles within his projects. His widespread use of wide angles allowed open space within his architectural designs. He also actively incorporated Southwestern and Arizonan-based cultural elements within his buildings, such as westward facing hogan entrances or patterns based on traditional Navajo rugs. His blending of brad angles and cultural elements produced a distinctive Southwestern style of architecture, which has been widely imitated throughout the region.

Gonzales' first commission as an architect was to design the library in Nogales, Arizona. The project earned him an award from the American Institute of Architects.

Gonzales' career was at its zenith during the 1960s and 1970s, when he was hired and commissioned to design many of Scottsdale's municipal buildings, which are still in use today. He designed the city of Scottsdale's main library, city hall, and the art complex, which is located across from the Civic Center Plaza. His design for Scottsdale City Hall included a feature called a kiva, which was highly unusual at the time, for public meetings rather than a traditional meeting space. The kiva, which is a Hopi term for an "open pit gathering space," was designed by Gonzales to have no walls or doors to separate it from the city hall's offices. Most of the Gonzales-designed public buildings were opened in 1968.

Gonzales also designed hundreds of single family homes, multifamily residences and public buildings across Arizona. His home on Palo Christi in Paradise Valley was featured in the February 10, 1967 issue of Life Magazine. Other projects included the hospital in Chinle.

Additionally, Gonzales designed numerous buildings throughout the world. One of his most prominent buildings outside of the United States was a $1.5 billion residence, which he designed for the Saudi Royal Family. The residence was constructed by Mohammed bin Awad bin Laden, a wealthy Saudi businessman and builder who was the father of Osama bin Laden.

Gonzales and his wife, Diane, built their home in Nogales using recycled materials. He focused largely on the new homes in the hills around Nogales during his later career.

== Death ==
Bennie Gonzales died of Alzheimer's disease at his home in Nogales, Arizona, on November 20, 2008, at the age of 84. He was survived by his wife, Diane, and two children from his earlier marriage (to Lupe Baca), Barney "B.J." Gonzales and Bianca Gonzales-Borman.

Architect Will Bruder reacted to Gonzales' death saying, "He (Gonzales) was an overlooked giant among architects of our generation in this Valley."

== Works ==
Buildings designed by Gonzales include

- 1953 Valley National Bank, Van Buren Branch, Phoenix, AZ
- 1962 Nogales Public Library, Nogales, AZ
- 1963 W. M. Wootton Residence, Tacna, AZ
- 1963 Southwest Produce Center, Nogales, AZ
- 1963 Rush Memorial Medical Building, Phoenix, AZ
- 1964 Bunney Residence, Wickenburg, AZ
- 1965 San Miguel Residential Development, Paradise Valley, AZ
- 1965 Scottsdale Bible Church, Scottsdale, AZ (now Temple Solel)
- 1966 Los Cuatros Apartments, Scottsdale, AZ
- 1966 Tierra Verde Village Center, Litchfield Park, AZ
- 1966 Anderson Apartment Complex, Yuma, AZ
- 1966 Western Savings Bank Branch, Yuma, AZ
- 1966 Eloy Junior High School, Eloy, AZ
- 1966 Gloria Dei Lutheran Church, Paradise Valley, AZ
- 1966 Gonzalez Residence, Paradise Valley, AZ
- 1966 Har Zion of the Desert, Paradise Valley, AZ (Demolished)
- 1967 Christ Church of the Ascension Episcopal Church, Paradise Valley, AZ
- 1967 Wootton Medical Building, Mesa, AZ
- 1967 Scottsdale Orthopedic Center, Scottsdale, AZ
- 1967 Ocotillo Branch Library, Phoenix, AZ
- 1967–1968 Heard Museum Renovation and Expansion, Phoenix, AZ
- 1968 Valley National Bank, Grand Avenue Branch, Nogales, AZ
- 1968 Dr. A. R. French Medical Building, Phoenix, AZ
- 1968 Scottsdale City Hall, Scottsdale, AZ
- 1968 Scottsdale Public Library, Scottsdale, AZ
- 1968 Scottsdale Police Station, Scottsdale, AZ
- 1968 Sedona Public Library, Sedona, AZ
- 1969 Arcadia Branch Library, Phoenix, AZ
- 1960s VFW Hall, Nogales, AZ
- 1960s Douglas Mansion: Mining Museum, Jerome, AZ
- 1960s St. Stephens Episcopal Church, Phoenix, AZ
- 1970 Yavapai Community College, Prescott, AZ
- 1971 Scottsdale Shadows Condominiums, Scottsdale, AZ
- 1971 Shiprock Estates, Shiprock, NM
- 1972 St. Pius X Catholic Church, Tucson, AZ
- 1972 Woodlands Inn & Information Center, Woodlands, TX
- 1973 Villa Manana Apartments, Phoenix, AZ
- 1974 Scottsdale Center for the Arts, Scottsdale, AZ
- 1976 Armour-Dial Research Center, Scottsdale, AZ (Demolished)
- 1976 Hopi Cultural Center, Second Mesa, AZ
- Circa 1976 Church of the Epiphany, Tempe, AZ
- 1977 Camelback Executive Park, Phoenix, AZ
- 1978 Cottonwoods Resort (Masterplan) Paradise Valley, AZ
- 1979 St. Elizabeth Seaton Catholic Church, Sun City, AZ
- 1979 South Mountain Community College, Phoenix, AZ
- 1979 Palm Desert Civic Center, Palm Desert, CA
- 1980 The Bolders Resort (Masterplan) Scottsdale, AZ
- 1984 Valley National Bank Biltmore Branch (now Chase Bank)
- 1986 Las Sabalos Resort, Mazatlan, Mexico
- 1980s King Khalid Residence, Saudi Arabia
- 1980s Gonzales Residence, Nogales, AZ

Undated Works

- Desert Haven Community Church, Tempe, AZ
- American Embassy, Mexico City, Mexico
- American Embassy, Benin, Africa
