= Letitia Chambers =

American museum director (born 1943)

- Born: Enid, Oklahoma, U.S.
- Spouse: Peter Plympton Smith

Letitia Pearl Caroline Chambers (born 1943 in Oklahoma) was the first woman to head the staff of a major standing committee of the U.S. Senate. Chambers was also a U.S. representative to the United Nations, the founder and chief executive officer of a Washington, D.C., public policy and consulting firm and was the director of the Heard Museum in Phoenix, Arizona from 2009 to 2012.

== Background ==
As the CEO and founder of Chambers Associates Inc., she made numerous contributions to public policy in a period of three decades. She has often testified as an expert witness, both before the U.S. Congress and in the U.S. court system.

Chambers resides in Santa Fe, New Mexico. She has a daughter, Melissa, and is married to Peter Plympton Smith, former member of the United States House of Representatives from the state of Vermont.

=== Early life ===
Chambers grew up in Enid, Oklahoma, the daughter of E. Wade and Anita M. Chambers. A graduate of the University of Oklahoma, she holds a doctorate in educational research and curriculum development from Oklahoma State University.

== Career ==
Early in her career, Chambers served as the staff director for the U.S. Senate Committee on Labor and Human Resources, which had jurisdiction over education, labor law, and social service programs. Prior to that she had served as a senior staff member on the Senate Budget Committee and as minority staff director of the Senate Special Committee on Aging. In 1981, she founded the public policy firm Chambers Associates. In 1992, she served on the Clinton/Gore transition team as Chief Budget Adviser, leading the Budget Policy Group and developing drafts of the President's Economic Plan. Chambers was nominated in 1996 by President Bill Clinton and confirmed by the Senate to be U.S. Representative to the United Nations General Assembly, a position of ambassadorial rank. In that capacity she served as a member of the Management and Budget Committee of the General Assembly.

In 2004 and 2005, Chambers headed up the system of higher education for the State of New Mexico, where she worked to revamp and reform key aspects of the system. She led the agency responsible for oversight of all public colleges, universities, and community colleges in the state. Dr. Chambers also chaired the New Mexico Educational Trust Board, served as a board member of the New Mexico Student Loan and Guarantee Corp, and became a commissioner of the Western Interstate Commission on Higher Education. In 2005, Chambers returned to consulting as a managing director of Navigant Consulting Inc.

Chambers has served on corporate boards, particularly in the financial sector. She has also served on numerous educational and philanthropic boards, many of which have focused on the arts and American Indian arts and cultures. She spent a decade on the board of the Institute of American Indian Arts and Culture (IAIA), which oversees both the College and the Museum in Santa Fe, New Mexico and served on the board of the Native Arts and Cultures Foundation. She chaired the Trustees Development and Facilities Committee that raised funds for and oversaw the building of the new campus. Chambers currently serves as a member of the NACF National Leadership Council. She was the director of the Heard Museum, the second woman (after museum founder Maie Bartlett Heard) and the first person of Native American heritage to lead the institution.
