= The Hooping Life =

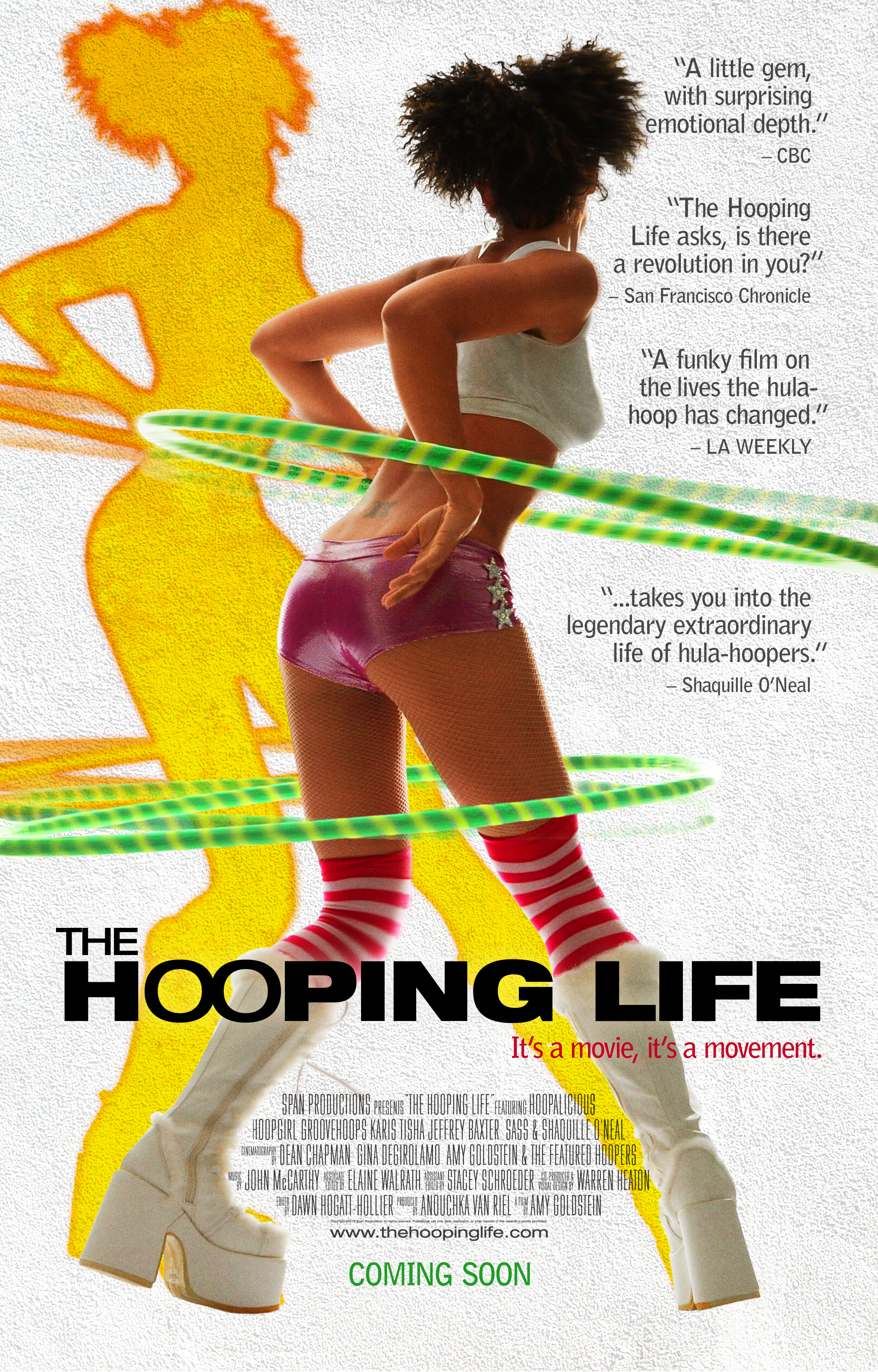
- Film poster
- Directed by: Amy Goldstein
- Produced by: Amy Goldstein; Anouchka van Riel
- Starring: Hoopalicious; Baxter; Hoopgirl; Tisha; Jeffrey; Karis; Groovehoops; Sass; Art Linkletter; Shaquille O'Neal; Michelle Obama; The String Cheese Incident; John Savage; Garry Marshall
- Cinematography: Amy Goldstein; Gina DeGirolamo; Dean Chapman; The featured hoopers
- Edited by: Dawn Hoggatt Hollier
- Release date: April 2010 (Sarasota Film Festival)
- Running time: 70 minutes
- Country: United States
- Language: English

The Hooping Life is a 2010 documentary film directed by Amy Goldstein. The film had its world premiere in April 2010 at the Sarasota Film Festival, and focuses on the history of hooping.

== Synopsis ==
The film takes a look at the subculture of hula hooping, which was primarily spearheaded by women. Narrated by Shaquille O'Neal, the documentary follows several people who participate in the subculture, incorporating it into their daily lives in various different ways.

== Cast ==
- Shaquille O'Neal as the Narrator (voice)
- Hoopalicious
- Baxter
- Hoopgirl
- Tisha
- Jeffrey
- Karis
- Groovehoops
- Sass
