= Nakotah LaRance =

Native American dancer (1989–2020)

Nakotah Lomasohu Raymond LaRance
- Born: August 23, 1989; Utqiagvik, Alaska, U.S.
- Died: July 12, 2020 (aged 30); Rio Arriba County, New Mexico, U.S.
- Citizenship: Hopi Tribe of Arizona
- Occupation: Dancer

Nakotah Lomasohu Raymond LaRance (August 23, 1989 - July 12, 2020) was a Native American hoop dancer and actor. He was a citizen of the Hopi Tribe of Arizona.

== Early life ==
LaRance was born on August 23, 1989, in Barrow, Alaska (now Utqiagvik). His parents were Marian Denipah, of Navajo and Tewa ancestry, and Steve LaRance, of Hopi and Assiniboine ancestry. He received the name “Lomasohu” by his paternal grandmother, which means "handsome star" in the Hopi language.

His parents were both jewelers and artists. He grew up in Flagstaff, Arizona, and spent summers in Moencopi, Arizona, before moving to New Mexico.

== Dancing career ==
At four years old, LaRance began dancing as a fancy dancer and competed in the youth division of the World Championship Hoop Dance Contest in Phoenix, Arizona. He performed on the Tonight Show with Jay Leno in 2004.

LaRance won three championships in the youth division and three in the teenage division of the World Championship Hoop Dance competition.

In 2009, LaRance joined the Cirque du Soleil troupe as a principal dancer. He worked as a traveling performer with the troupe for over three years. In 2015, he danced at the opening of the Pan American Games in Toronto with Cirque du Soleil.

He won the title of World Champion at the Hoop Dance Contest three times, as part of the adult division in 2015, 2016 and 2018.

LaRance taught hoop dancing to students at the Lightning Boy Foundation in New Mexico.

== Death ==
LaRance died at age 30 on July 12, 2020, after a fall from climbing a bridge in Rio Arriba County, New Mexico.
