= The Unmaking of a College =

- Directed by: Amy Goldstein
- Music by: Nathan Larson
- Release date: 2022
- Country: United States
- Language: English

The Unmaking of a College is a 2022 documentary film. The film covers the planned closure of Hampshire College in 2019 and the subsequent movement by students, alumni, and professors that saved the school.

== Aftermath ==
In spite of the efforts depicted in the film, on April 14, 2026, Hampshire College announced its upcoming closure.
