= Native American Hoop Dance =

Form of Native American dance

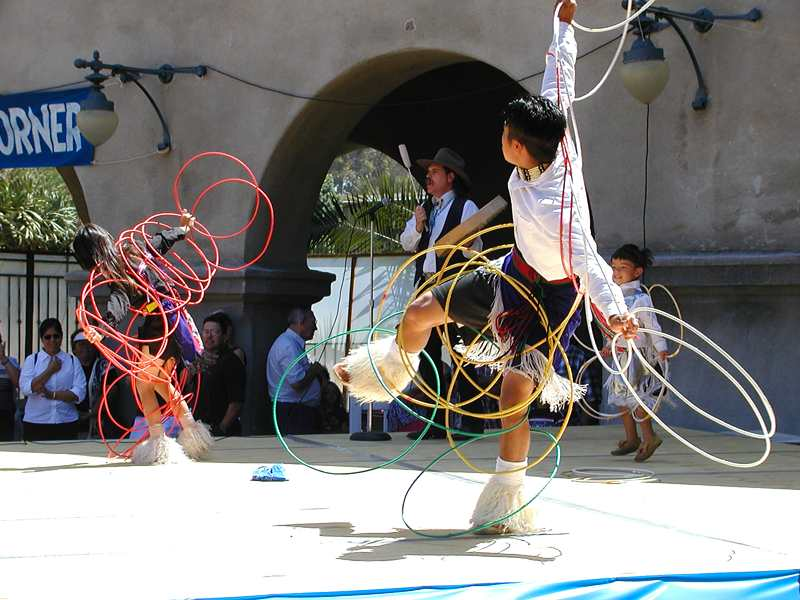
Carl Moore, Cedric Moore and Jacob Fields performing a Native American Hoop Dance

Native American Hoop Dance is a form of individual dance, performed as a show dance in many tribes. It features a solo dancer dancing with a dozen or more hoops and using them to form a variety of both static and dynamic shapes (poses and moves). Most of the hoop dances in tribes across North America belong to modern hoop dance, which was invented in 1930.

== Description ==
Like other native dances, hoop dance is not acrobatic, but restrained. The dancer usually takes small steps when performing the dance. Hoop dance, an individual dance, is a "show dance" in some tribes. They will move either clockwise or counterclockwise as determined by their cosmology and worldview. Native American Hoop dance usually focuses on very rapid moves, but sometimes speed and creativeness balance the scoring between Hoop dancers who use only four hoops but dance to extremely fast songs, versus dancers with 20 or more hoops who danced to a slower drumbeat. Every dance is as individual as the person who choreographs it. Some dancers mimic animals such as birds or working of hunting, fishing, planting and harvesting. In elaborate sequences of moves, the hoops are made to interlock, and in such a way they can be extended from the body of the dancer to form appendages such as wings and tails.

There are usually 28 hoops used in the hoop dance, and they symbolize "a prayer that the promised renewal of the collective human spirit will accelerate and that we will all find our place in one great hoop made up of many hoops." The hoops symbolizes the "never-ending cycle of life," having no beginning and no end. The dancers usually make their own hoops. Modern hoops are made from an array of materials while traditional wood hoops are made of willow. More popular now are reed and plastic hose hoops decorated with tape and paint, according to the dancer's preference. Today, many contemporary hoop dancers will color their hoops in four colors to represent the four directions.

== Origin ==
According to writer Basil H. Johnston in Anishinaabe culture, a Manitou named Pukawiss, brother of Nanabozho, and born to live amongst the people, created the hoop dance. Unlike the other boys, Pukawiss did not show an interest in running, swimming or hunting. He only wanted to watch the animals. His fascination with things drove his father's interest away from him towards his brother Maudjee-kawiss, therefore, leading to everyone calling him Pukawiss: the disowned or unwanted. Pukawiss learned so much about life in the movements of eagles, bears, snakes that taking their life would have been wrong. The animals had much to teach human beings about values and relationship like loyalty, kindness and friendship. Pukawiss taught his village about the animals by spinning like an eagle in flight or hopping through grass like rabbits or bouncing like a baby deer. He became a dancer. So many villages wanted him to teach them about the ways of the animals that he had to give up his home and became a permanent visitor. Many women wanted him to settle with them in their village but he preferred to keep moving.

Pukawiss and his brother Cheeby-aub-oozoo added drums and flute to the dance. Later, Pukawiss added the stories of humankind to his performances. He invented the hoop dance to help him with this goal. The dancer became a counselor with the hoops representing a circle that returns each problem back to the responsibility of its creator. According to Basil Johnston, "the hoop is also emblematic of the way things are, in that mischief breeds mischief that eventually returns to haunt and plague the inventor". Eventually many became jealous of Pukawiss - his fancy dress, and his skill with the hoops so they copied him. Like his father, his brother Maudjee-kawiss did not understand his artistic ways and sought to scold him. Pukawiss often provoked his audience by teasing them. As an older brother, he teased his other brothers perhaps once too often. Insulted by a Pukawiss prank involving the theft of his prize pigeons, Nanabozho angrily razed the mountain under which Pukawiss had been hiding camouflaged as a snake. Pukawiss wasn't killed but now he had a new job: to taunt those who are too proud. The Anishinaabe believe that we see him each time the wind teases the leaves and soil to dance.

The hoop dance people see today is categorized as modern hoop dance. Although many tribes lay claim to the Hoop Dance, it wasn't until the 1930s that a young man named Tony White Cloud, Jemez Pueblo, began using multiple hoops in a stylized version and became known as "founder of the modern Hoop Dance." Tony White Cloud used five hoops made of willow wood bent to form a circle. These hoops were approximately 24 inches in diameter, a size large enough to get his body through. This became the foundation of modern hoop dance. The modern dance with 22-28 hoops evolved when the dancers began using reed from Vietnam instead of the dance with 7 to 10 heavy willow hoops.

== Hoop Dance in White Mountain Apache ==
The White Mountain Apache is one of the few Native American tribes that was not forced to leave its territory and live on a reservation when faced with the Westward expansion of the US government. They kept on living on their territory they had settled in Athabaskan migration in East Arizona. For the most part, White Mountain Apache dance and religious ceremonies had always been oriented toward healing. The modern medicine has taken away some of the healing ritual and traditional curing ceremonies, however, dancing still retains its strong spiritual significance. Hoop dance is one of the most important healing dances in the White Mountain Apache. In the past, the Hoop Dance was performed during lightning ceremonies, to cure people who had been struck by lightning or who had inadvertently used a piece of lightning-struck wood for some purpose. In a 1936 record, a sick person was seated on a blanket in the middle of a dance gourd facing east. One boy and one girl stood on the east, south, west and north side of him, holding crosses and hoops. The youngsters danced to the patient while the medicine man started to sing. The boy then placed the hoops over the patient’s head and the girls holding the crosses. Then the boys and girls danced back to their original position. The dance was then repeated as the medicine man sang.

== Competition ==
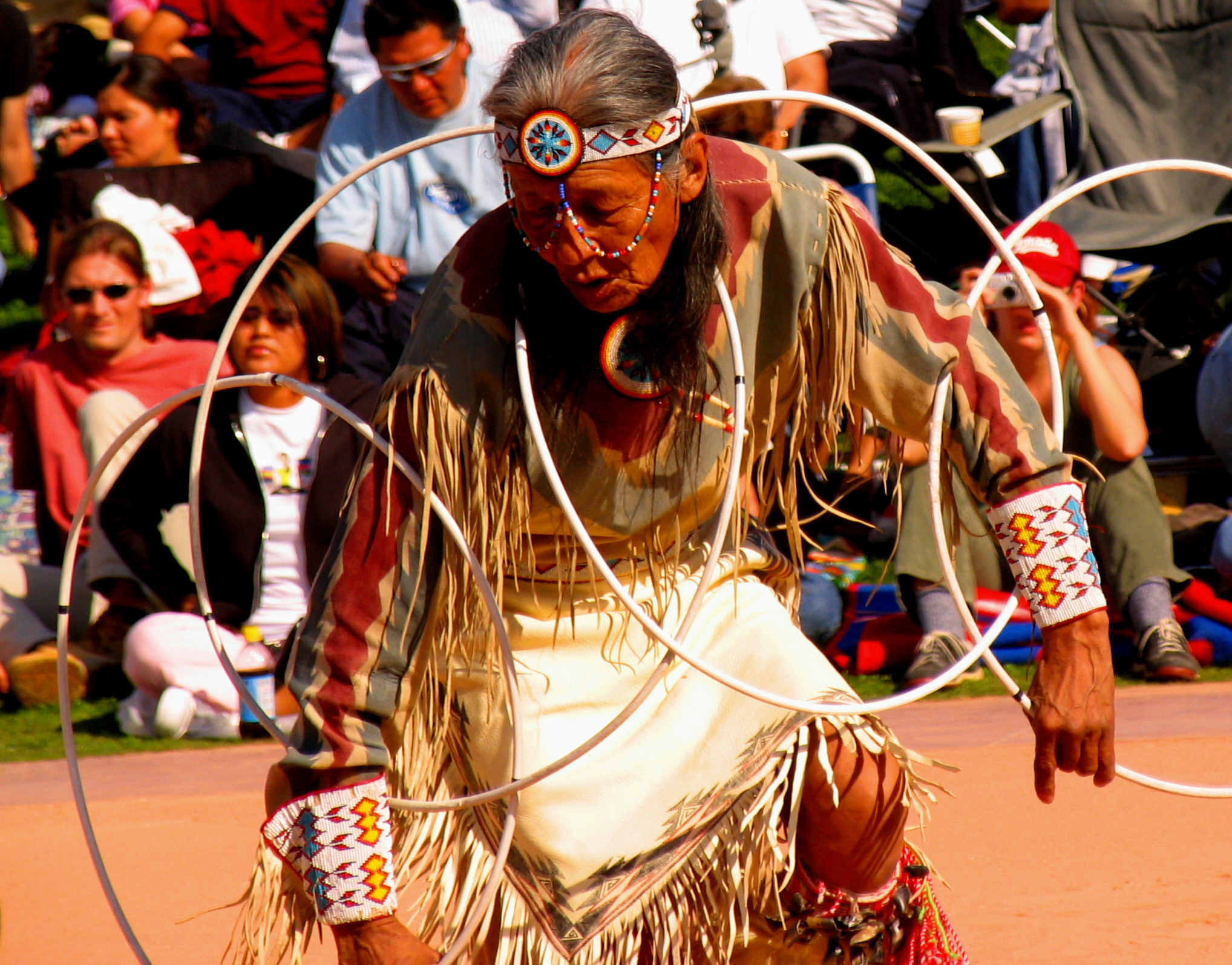
Participant in the 2005 World Championship Hoop Dance Contest.

Native American Hoop Dance has been formally recognized as a cultural heritage, embodied in both documentary films and as a living tradition in formal competition. The most popular competition occurs annually at the Heard Museum in Phoenix, Arizona. Up to 80 dancers have participated in any given year, and the competitions have drawn as many as 10,000 spectators.

The first World Hoop Dance Competition was held at the New Mexico State Fair in 1991. The first World Champion Hoop Dancer was Eddie Swimmer, a Cherokee from Cherokee, North Carolina. The venue was moved to the Heard Museum in Arizona for the second event and the first adult winner of what was to become the permanent venue was Quentin Pipestem of the Tsuu T'ina Nation in Alberta, Canada. The hoop dance is part of the pan-Indian movement and as such has evolved over the years by becoming faster and incorporating many influences from outside traditional culture such as the use of moves from hip hop dance as well as the widespread use of industrial piping to construct hoops that were originally made from reeds or willow branches. Hoop dance has gained a strong following internationally as an increasing number of dancers tour the world. Nakota La Rance, already a six-time World Championship winner at 23, performed for the 2010-11 season of Totem by Cirque du Soleil.

=== Women and the hoop dance ===
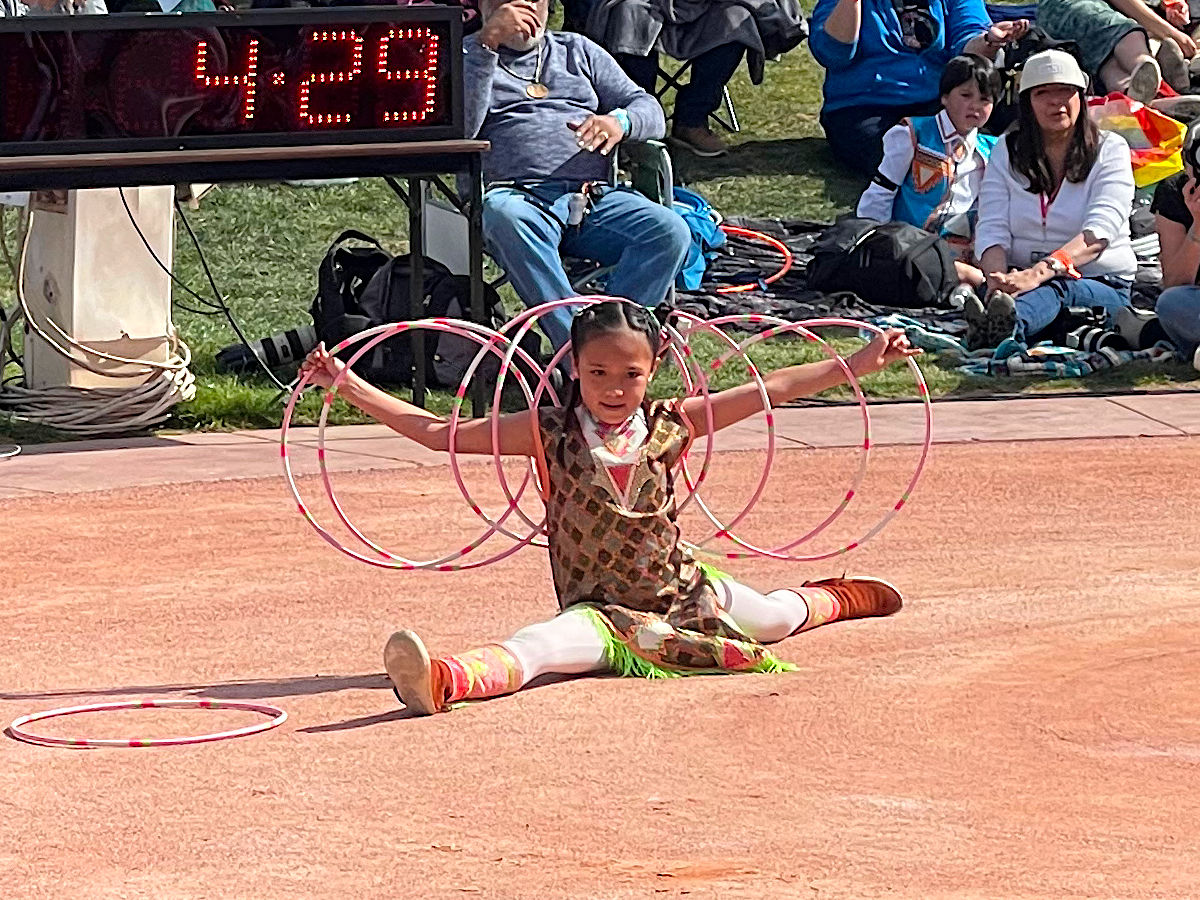
Youth Division contestant at 2023 World Championship

Although originally a male-only dance form, in recent years women have become active participants in the hoop dance and in hoop dance competitions. In 1994, Jackie Bird (Mandan, Hidatsa and Santee Sioux, from South Dakota) became the first woman to compete in the Hoop Dance World Championships. In 1997, Ginger Sykes (Navajo, from Arizona) became the first woman to win the Hoop Dance World Championships by winning the Teen Division. For performing at Mount Rushmore, Jasmine Pickner (Lakota) has been featured in the PBS documentary The National Parks: America's Best Idea (2009). In 2000, Lisa Odjig (Odawa and Anishnaabe, from Ontario, Canada) became the first female adult Hoop Dance world champion.

== In popular culture ==
Hoop dance is usually called the "entertaining dance" in the Native American tribes. These kinds of dramatic dances are staples of Indigenous performances for non-Indigenous audiences, but are rare at powwows. Because the complexity of hoop dance, it takes years of practice to master. The inventor of modern hoop dance, Tony White Cloud, popularized it to America by performing it in the movie Valley of the Sun in 1942. During World War II, White Cloud traveled with Gene Autry across America and Europe promoting war bonds to fund the war effort by performing the Hoop Dance. He later danced in Autry’s movie, Apache Country, in 1952. Kevin Locke is another famous Native American Hoop dancer. His dance awed spectators as it created visual images of the seasons, of the moon and sun, flowers, butterflies and way of life.

== See also ==
- Native Americans in the United States
- First Nations
- Hooping
- Hula hoop
