= Hooping =

Activity or dance using a hula hoop

Hooping (also called hula hooping or hoop dance) is the manipulation of and artistic movement or dancing with a hoop (or hoops). Hoops can be made of metal, wood, or plastic. Hooping combines technical moves and tricks with freestyle or technical dancing. Hooping can be practiced to or performed with music. In contrast to the classic toy hula hoop, modern hoopers use heavier and larger diameter hoops, and frequently rotate the hoop around parts of the body other than the waist, including the hips, chest, neck, shoulders, thighs, knees, arms, hands, thumbs, feet, and toes. The hoop can also be manipulated and rotated off the body as well. Modern hooping has been influenced by art forms such as rhythmic gymnastics, hip-hop, freestyle dance, fire performance, twirling, poi, and other dance and movement forms.

Hooping is a physical dexterity activity that has been described as a part of flow arts, and a form of object manipulation. It is sometimes described as a form of juggling.

In its modern incarnation as an art or dance form, and form of exercise, the practice of manipulating a hoop is referred to either as hoop dance or simply hooping. Hoop dance artists commonly refer to themselves, and the greater hoop dance community, as hoopers.

== The hoop ==
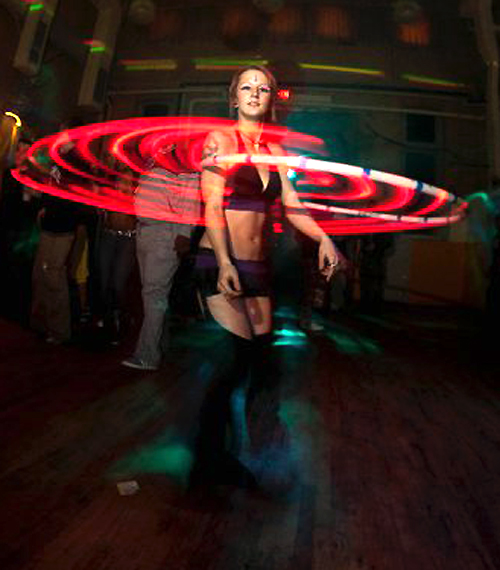
A performer performing with an LED hoop

Hoopers generally use hoops crafted from polyethylene (HDPE) or polypropylene (1/2", 5/8", 3/4", 7/8", or 1" diameter) tubing and wrap the hoop with colorful tape, which serves the dual purpose of providing decoration and grip. These modern hoops differ from the water-filled plastic toys commonly available for children. The heavier weight of these hoops allows for more controlled movement around the body; the larger diameter and heavier rotational mass allows for both slower rotation, and ease of learning moves such as "portal" tricks, where the hooper steps through the hoop while it is still rotating. In contrast, children's hoops are typically made of lightweight plastic, have a very small diameter, and are incredibly difficult for most adults to use.

Traditionally, Circus hoopers such as Elena Lev (of Cirque du Soleil) typically use lightweight hoops made of aluminium, or, in earlier days, wood. Nowadays, however modern circus hoopers like Lisa Lottie will choose lightweight plastics such as Polypropylene.

Typically, an adult will begin with a hoop of approximately 38–44 in (97–112 cm) diameter. While these hoops may seem huge compared to children's hoops, they are typically required for adults to learn the skill quickly. As their skill improves people can use hoops of a smaller diameter. Advanced hoopers typically use a hoop between 30 and 36 in (76 and 91 cm) diameter. There are however hoops that go all the way down to an 18" diameter and lower, these are mainly used by hoopers of a higher skill level. These hoops are called mini hoops.

Many modern hoopers make their own hoops out of polyvinyl chloride, polyethylene, high-density polyethylene, or polypropylene tubing. The size and the weight of the hoop affects style of the hooper. Heavier, larger hoops are more often used for slow hooping and body tricks while lighter, thinner tubing is used for quick hand tricks. These hoops may be covered in a fabric or plastic tape to ease the amount of work in keeping a hoop twirling around the dancer, and can be very colourful. Some use glow-in-the dark, patterned, or sparkling tape, and others are produced with clear tubing and filled with plastic balls, glitter, or even water to produce visual or audio effects when used.

Hoops can be made collapsible for easy transport and versatility: each hoop breaks down into four or more pieces to later be reassembled. Other collapsible hoops are simply twisted down, and folded in half for easy storage.

Other types of hoops are also used by hoopers, including fire hoops and LED or glow hoops.

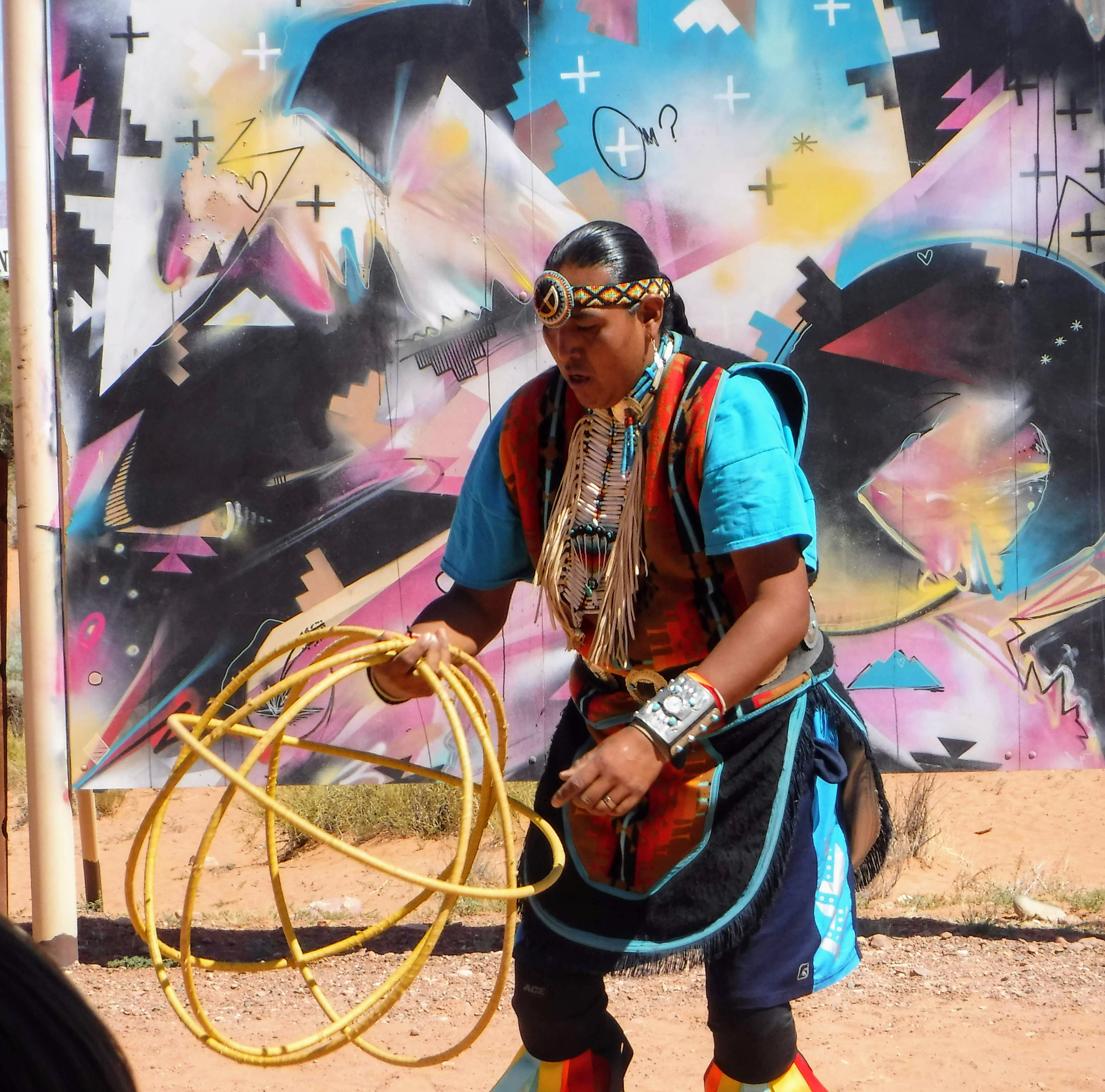
Hoop dance

== History ==
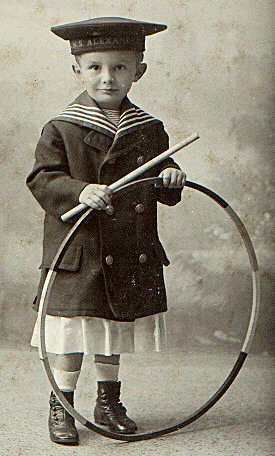
A boy with a hoop. Hoops have long been a popular toy across a variety of cultures.

=== Ancient ===
The earliest known incidence of hooping was in ancient Egypt as early as 1000 BC, where children used large hoops made of grape vines, which they rolled along the ground propelled by sticks, or swung around their waists, akin to the modern hoop. In other parts of the ancient world, hoops were made of stiff grasses as opposed to vine.

=== Old world ===
In the 14th century, recreational hooping swept across England. The records of doctors at the time attribute numerous dislocated backs and heart attacks to "hooping." The word "hula" became associated with the toy in the early 19th century when British sailors visited the Hawaiian Islands and noted the similarity between "hooping" and traditional hula dancing.

Independently, Native Americans developed their own traditions surrounding the Hoop Dance. Native American Hoop Dance focuses on very rapid moves, and the construction of hoop formations around and about the body. Up to 30 hoops may be used in storytelling rituals to create formations such as the butterfly, the eagle, the snake, and the coyote. Native American hoops are typically of very small diameter (1 to 2.5 feet).

The late 1800s and early 1900s saw the introduction of hoop dancing into the world of physical fitness; a Swedish instructor began to incorporate the hoop into his special training system for dancers and musicians.

=== Twentieth century ===
In 1957, an Australian company began manufacturing bamboo hoops for sale in retail stores. This caught the attention of a new California-based toy company, Wham-O, founded by Richard P. Knerr and Arthur K. Melin. In 1958, Knerr and Melin traveled to playgrounds across Southern California, where they gave away free hula hoops and performed hooping demonstrations for the children. They sold over 25 million hula hoops in a four-month period.

=== Modern Day ===
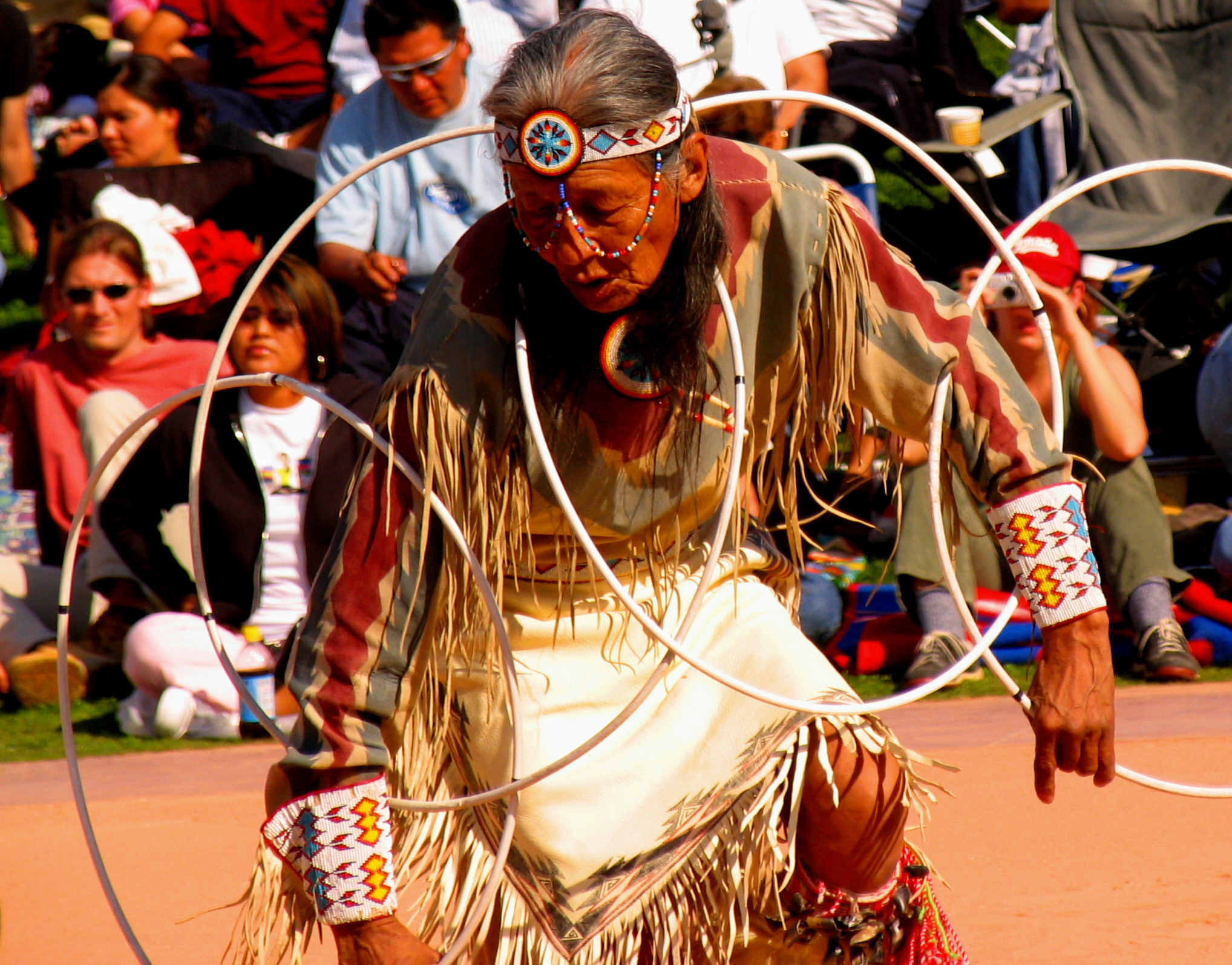
A participant in the 2005 World Hoop Dance Championship at the Heard Museum

The annual Burning Man festival has served as an event for hoopers from around the world to share their tricks, techniques, and energy. Grassroots "hoop jams" and "convergences" such as HoopCamp (Watsonville, California), Hoop Convergence (Efland, North Carolina), SWOOP (Bristol, UK), and Return to Roots Hoop Gathering (Medford, New Jersey) happen in almost every month of the year. These meet-ups, as well as various online communities, are foundational for the hooping subculture.

An international celebration called World Hoop Day began in 2007. Hoopers perform in many cities and countries to raise money for charity and donate hoops to people who cannot afford them.

Native American Hoop Dance has been recognized as a cultural heritage. The most popular Native Hoop Dance competition occurs annually at the Heard Museum in Phoenix, Arizona. Competitions have drawn as many as 10,000 spectators.

Hooping has become a popular activity in dance studios, as a circus skill, and through its inclusion in music videos and films.

== Hoop busker ==
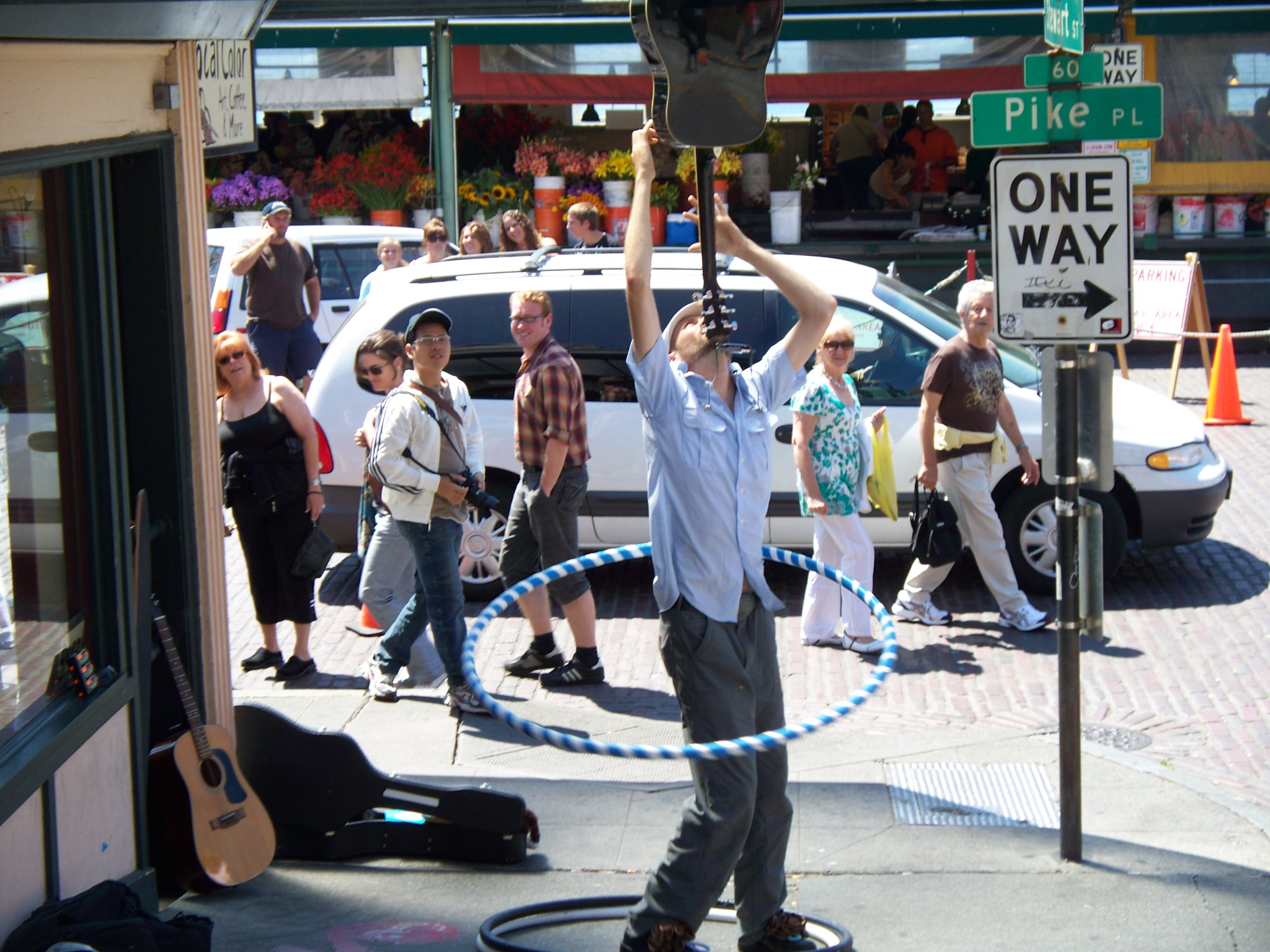
A hoop busker balancing a guitar and hula hoop at the Pike Place market in Seattle

A hoop busker is a street performer who performs artistic movement with one or more hoops in the dance style of hooping.

Performances given by a hoop busker will usually combine hooping with other disciplines including acrobatics, contortion, juggling, singing, and playing one or more musical instruments. There are many busker festivals that feature one or more hoop buskers including the World Buskers Festival held annually in Christchurch, New Zealand.

== Fire hooping ==
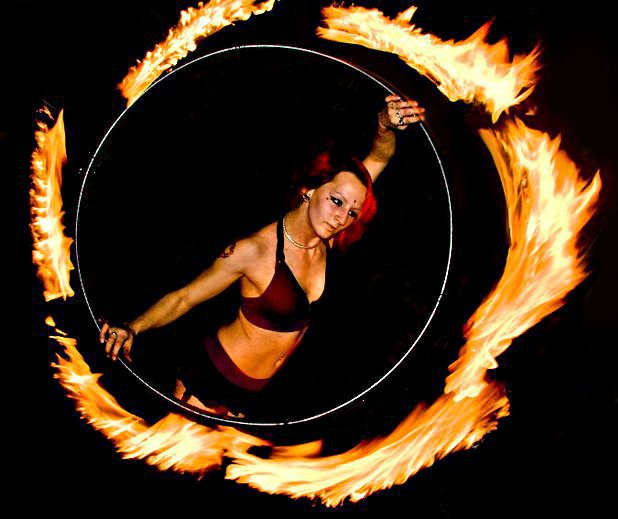
A hooper performing with a fire hula hoop in New York City

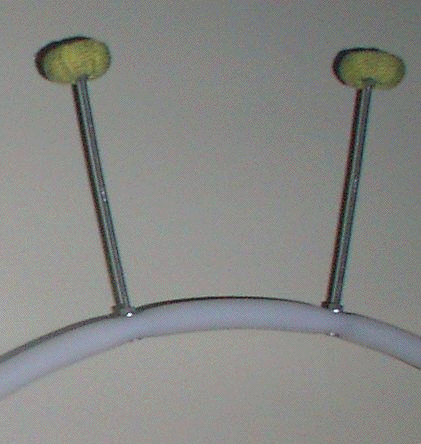
Fire hoop wicks attached to spines that keep the wicks away from the user

A fire hoop consists of a hoop with one to six spokes radiating outward. The spokes typically extend 6–8 inches from the connection points on the hoop, and are capped with a roll of cotton and Kevlar wicking, which can then be lit. This design keeps the fire a fair distance from the hooper's body. Any skill where fire is a component risks injury to the person doing it.

The construction and weight of the fire hoop, combined with the fact that it is on fire, limits the possible moves or tricks than those possible with a standard hoop. Some modern fire hoops have been designed to be much lighter, with smaller diameter tubing and with flexible wick spokes. The use of these hoops has enabled hoopers to perform a greater range of tricks than with standard fire hoops.

== LED hooping ==
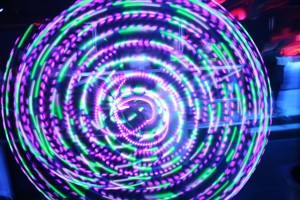

LED hooping involves the use of a translucent or transparent hoop which has multiple LEDs inside the tube. LED hoops have internal batteries and are lit with light-emitting diodes (LEDs).

These hoops are slightly heavier than standard hoops, although typically lighter than fire hoops.

There are a variety of LED hoops that hoopers use including ones with various color LEDs, ones that are programmable through the use of a microchip and ones that are collapsible.

Programmable hoops can be programmed to create patterns due to the persistence of vision effect. The quickly changing the color of the LEDs, and the movement of the hoop can create basic pixel images or geometric patterns. Some models incorporate motion sensors to produce more elaborate visual effects in response to the motion of the hoop and the user, as well as wireless interfaces for control and synchronization.

The standard grip tape is not typically used on LED hoops because it would block the lights. Sanded tubing can provide added friction, as can a thin strip of grip tape along the inside of the hoop.

== Fitness ==
Hooping has become popularized as a fitness regimen alongside kickboxing, breakdancing and bellydancing. Hoop dance classes can now be found in gyms, and is often combined with Pilates or yoga disciplines, all of which build strength, balance, and flexibility.

Hooping improves cardiovascular health and burns calories, since it is a type of aerobic exercise. A study by the American Council on Exercise found that a thirty-minute hooping workout burns around 200 calories. A 2015 study published in the Journal of Strength and Conditioning Research found that during a six-week trial with weighted hoops, participants lost an average of 1.3 inches (3.3 centimeters) from their waistline and 0.5 inch (1.27 centimeters) from their hips. Hooping works many muscles in the body and has the potential to build core muscle strength while improving flexibility and balance.

== World records ==
=== Duration ===
The longest continuous hula hooping record was held for a decade by Aaron Hibbs from Columbus, Ohio, who kept a hoop spinning for 74 hours and 54 minutes from October 22–25, 2009. In November 2019, Jenny Doan broke that record by hula-hooping for 100 hours at the District Brew Yards in Chicago, following the Guinness World Record protocol.

=== Simultaneous twirling ===
The record for most hula hoops twirled at the same time is 200, by Marawa Ibrahim set on November 25, 2015.

=== Simultaneous dancing ===
On February 19, 2013, 4,483 people swung hula hoops to dance music for seven minutes. They did this without interruption at Thammasat University stadium in Thailand, setting a world record for the most people dancing with hula hoops simultaneously in one place.

=== Other records ===
The largest hoop successfully twirled was 5.04 m (16.5 ft) in diameter, by Ashrita Furman of the United States in September, 2010.

In 2000, Roman Schedler spun a 53-pound tractor tyre for 71 seconds at the 5th Saxonia Record Festival in Bregenz, Austria.

In April 2010, 70 hoopers on Team Hooprama hula hooped the Music City Half-Marathon (21.0975 kilometres (13.1094 mi)) to raise awareness and funds for Hooping for Hope.

In March 2013, the largest hula hoop workout (407 participants) was achieved at Ravenscraig Regional Sports Facility in Scotland by North Lanarkshire Leisure and Powerhoop Fitness.

== See also ==
- Hoop rolling
- The Hooping Life
- Native American Hoop Dance
