= Heard Museum =

American Indian museum in Arizona

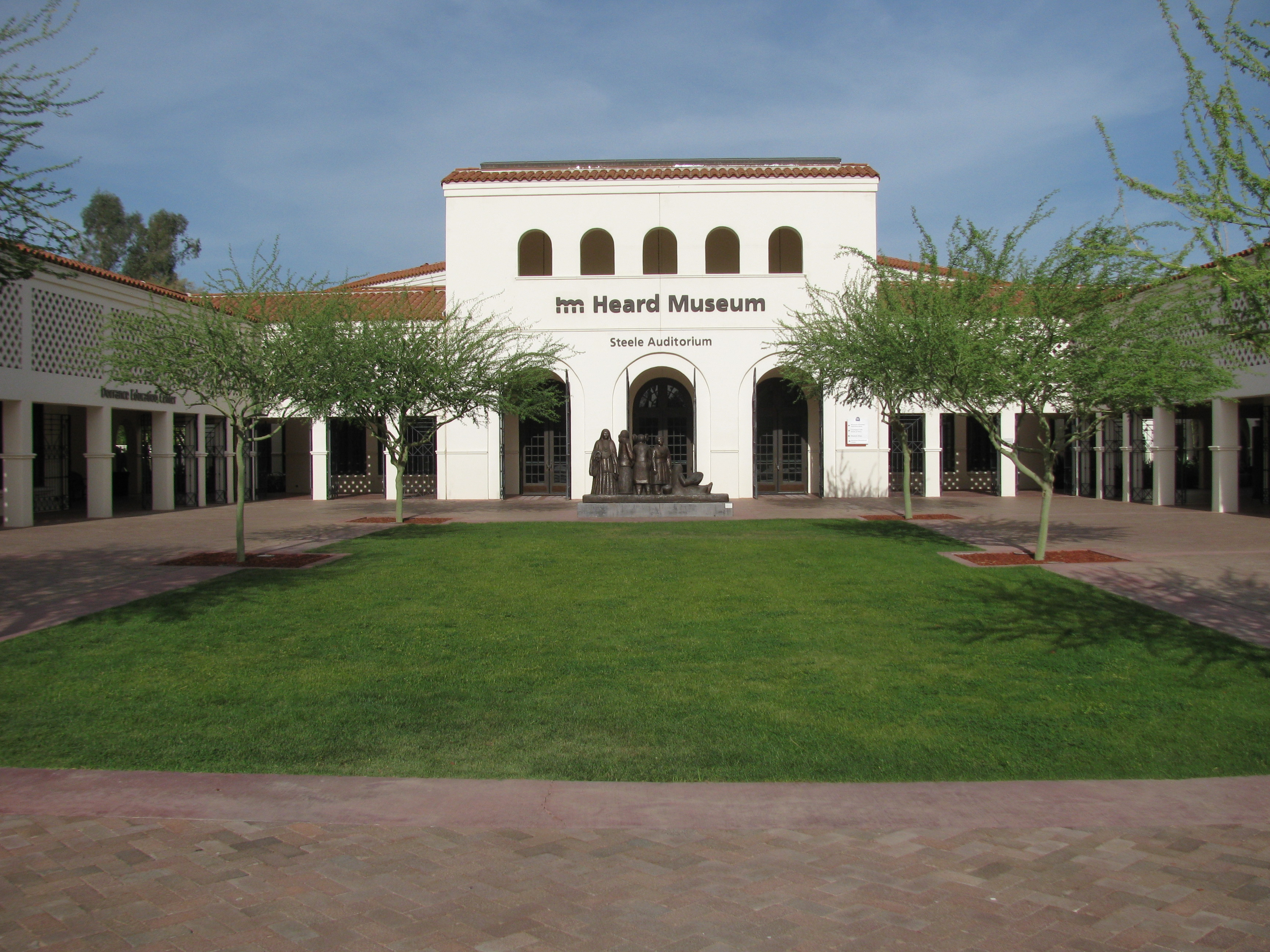

- Location within Arizona
- Established: 1929
- Location: Phoenix, Arizona
- Coordinates: 33°28′25″N 112°04′25″W
- Type: Private, not-for-profit museum
- Accreditation: American Alliance of Museums
- Key holdings: American Indian art
- Collection size: 40,000 items
- Visitors: 250,000 visitors a year
- Founders: Dwight B. and Maie Bartlett Heard
- Director: David M. Roche
- Architect: Bennie Gonzales
- Public transit access: Encanto/Central Avenue
- Website: heard.org

The Heard Museum is a private, not-for-profit museum in Phoenix, Arizona, United States, dedicated to the advancement of American Indian art. It presents the stories of American Indian people from a first-person perspective, as well as exhibitions of traditional and contemporary art by American Indian artists and artists influenced by American Indian art.

The main Phoenix location of the Heard Museum has been designated as a Phoenix Point of Pride.

The museum previously operated two branches: in Surprise the Heard Museum West branch which closed in 2009, and in Scottsdale the Heard Museum North Scottsdale branch which closed in May 2014.

== History ==
The Heard Museum was founded in 1929 by Dwight B. and Maie Bartlett Heard to house their personal collection of art. Much of the archaeological material in the Heards' collection came from La Ciudad Indian ruin, which the Heards purchased in 1926 at 19th and Polk streets in Phoenix.

Portions of the museum were designed by architect Bennie Gonzales, who also designed Scottsdale City Hall.

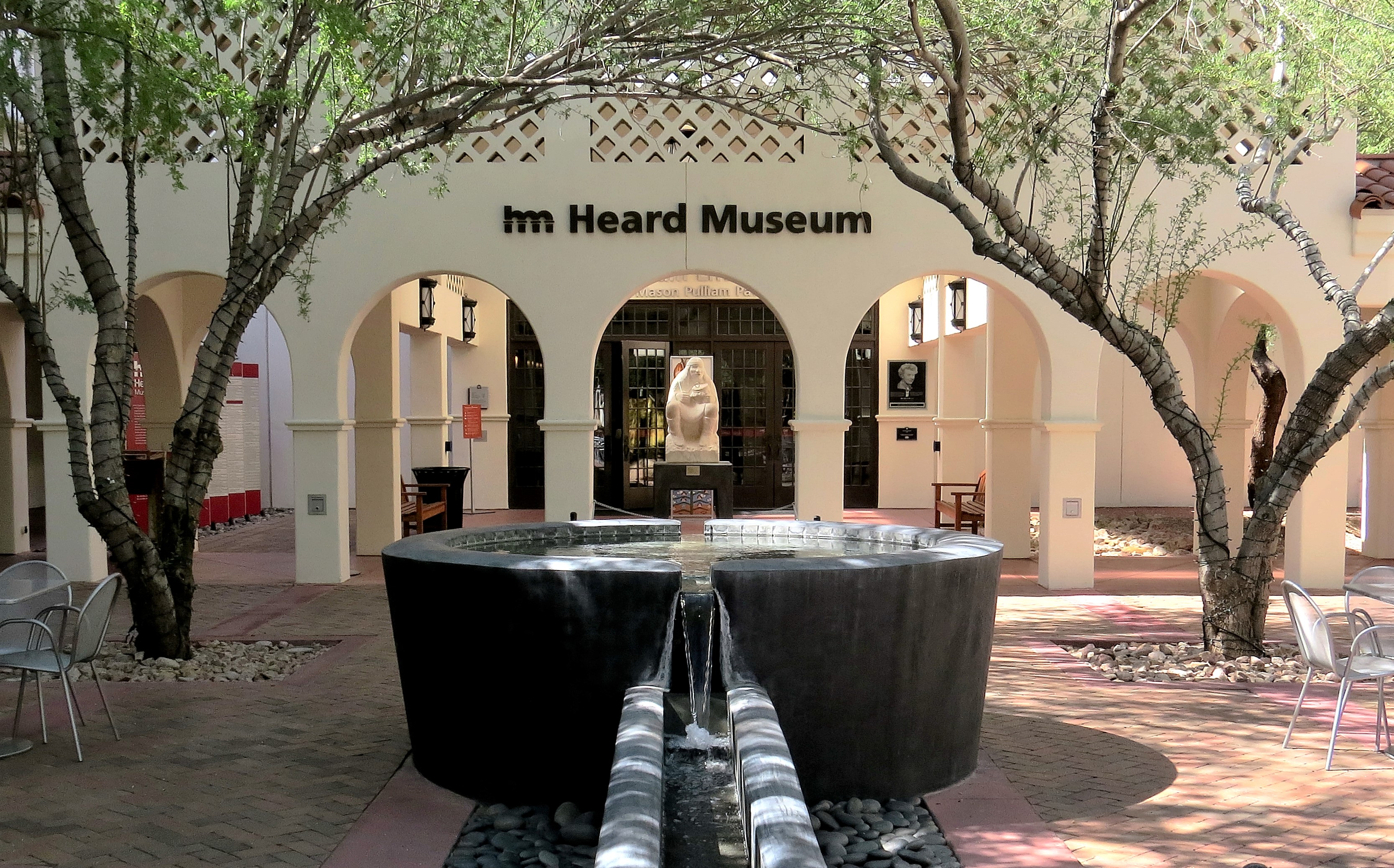
Entrance to museum

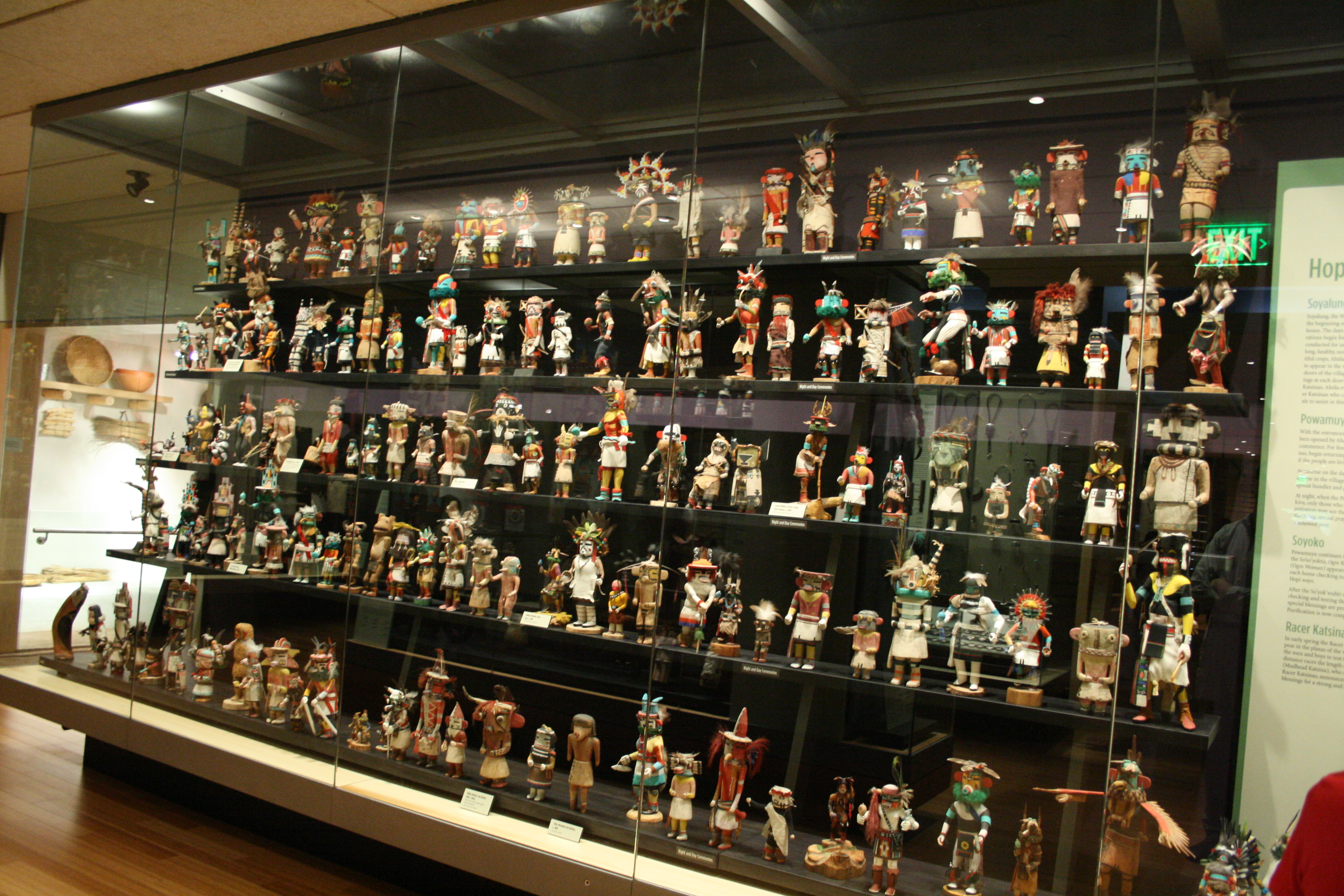
Collection of kachina dolls

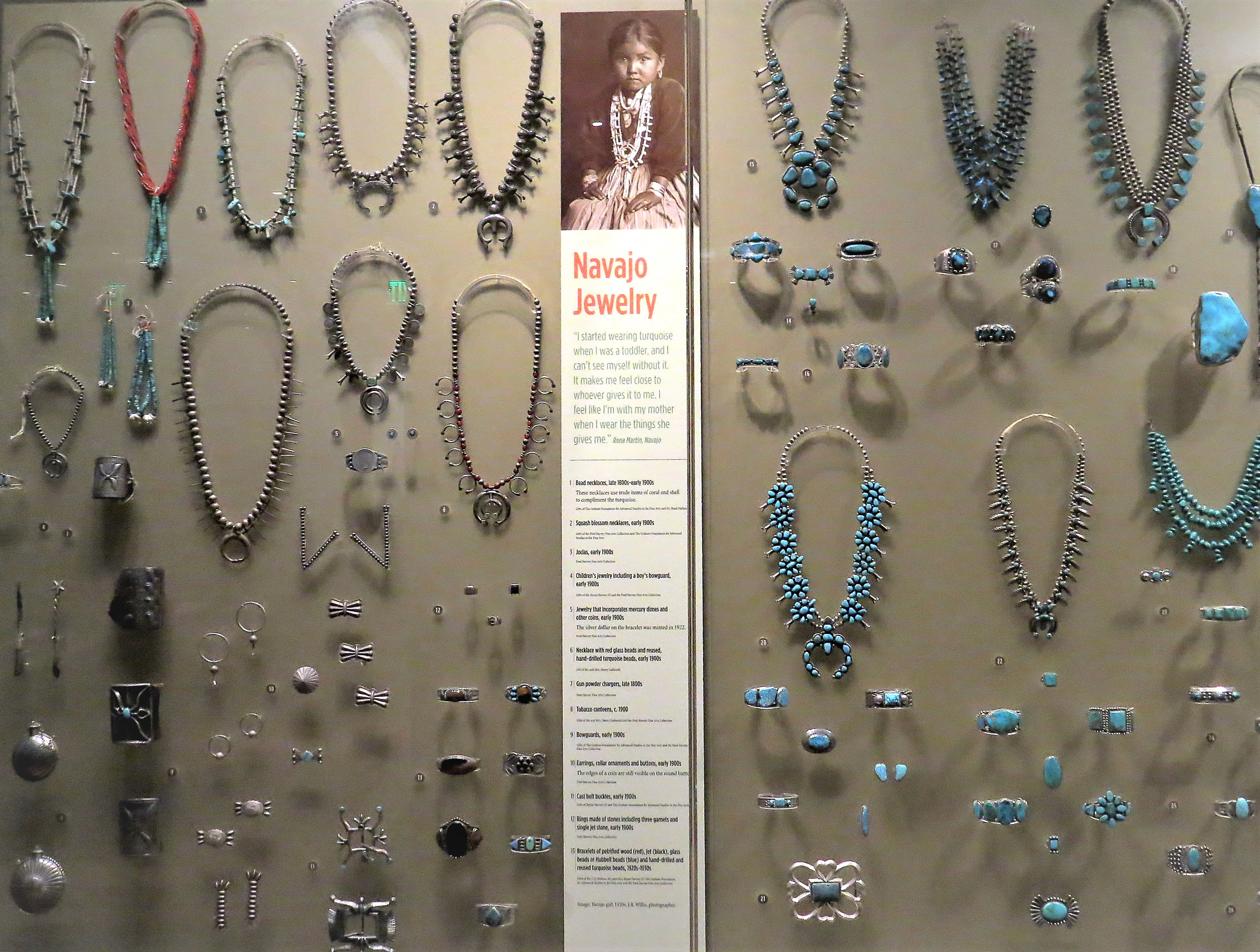
Navajo jewelry display

The collection of the Heard Museum consists of over 40,000 items including a library and archives with over 34,000 volumes. The museum has over 130,000 square feet (12,000 m^{2}) of gallery, classroom, and performance space. Some exhibits include:

- Home: Native Peoples in the Southwest
- The Mareen Allen Nichols Collection containing 260 pieces of contemporary jewelry
- The Barry Goldwater Collection of 437 historic Hopi kachina dolls
- An exhibition on the 19th century boarding school experiences of Native Americans. According to the New York Times, the exhibit "captures the little-known experience of thousands of children bused, sometimes forcibly, from their reservations to government schools in order to erase their culture and 'civilize' them. Haunting photographs, old uniforms, oral interviews and memorabilia offer a powerful look at this chapter in history."

The Heard Museum attracts about 250,000 visitors a year. The Heard is an affiliate in the Smithsonian Affiliations program. The director of the museum from January 2010 through July 2012 was Dr. Letitia Chambers, the first Heard director of American Indian descent. From August 5, 2013 to February 27, 2015, the museum was led by James Pepper Henry, a member of the Kaw Nation of Oklahoma and the Muscogee Creek Nation. As of January 2016, the museum is led by David M. Roche.

The museum is a member of the North American Reciprocal Museums program.

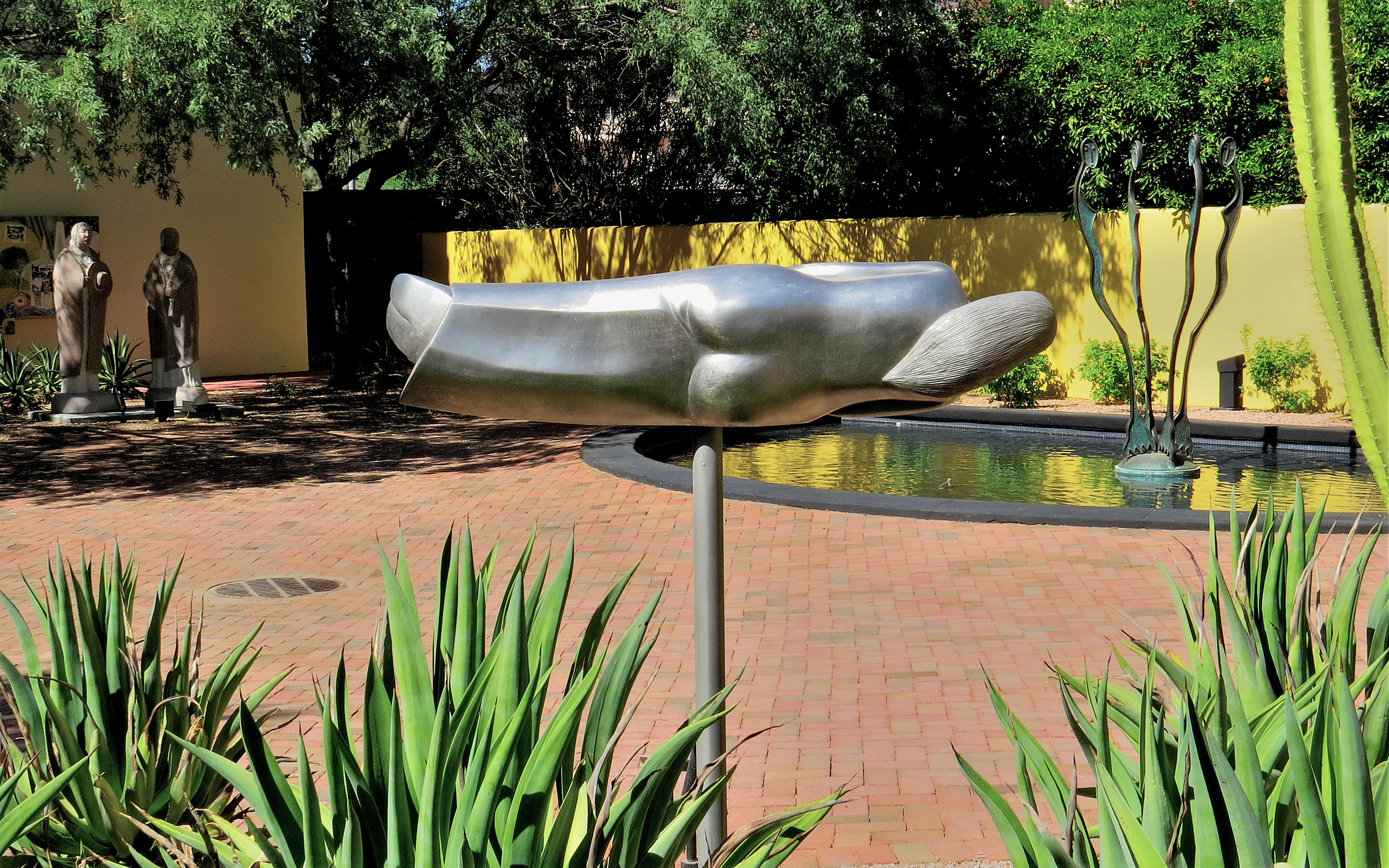
Garden adjacent to main entrance

== Festivals ==
The Heard hosts the annual El Mercado de Las Artes, usually in November, with strolling mariachis and artwork by Hispanic artists from Arizona and New Mexico including santos, pottery, colcha embroidery, furniture making, painting, printmaking and silver and tinwork. The Heard also hosts the annual World Championship Hoop Dance Contest, typically held in early February. The Hoop Dance Contest is held in the outdoor Libby Amphitheater in front of the museum.

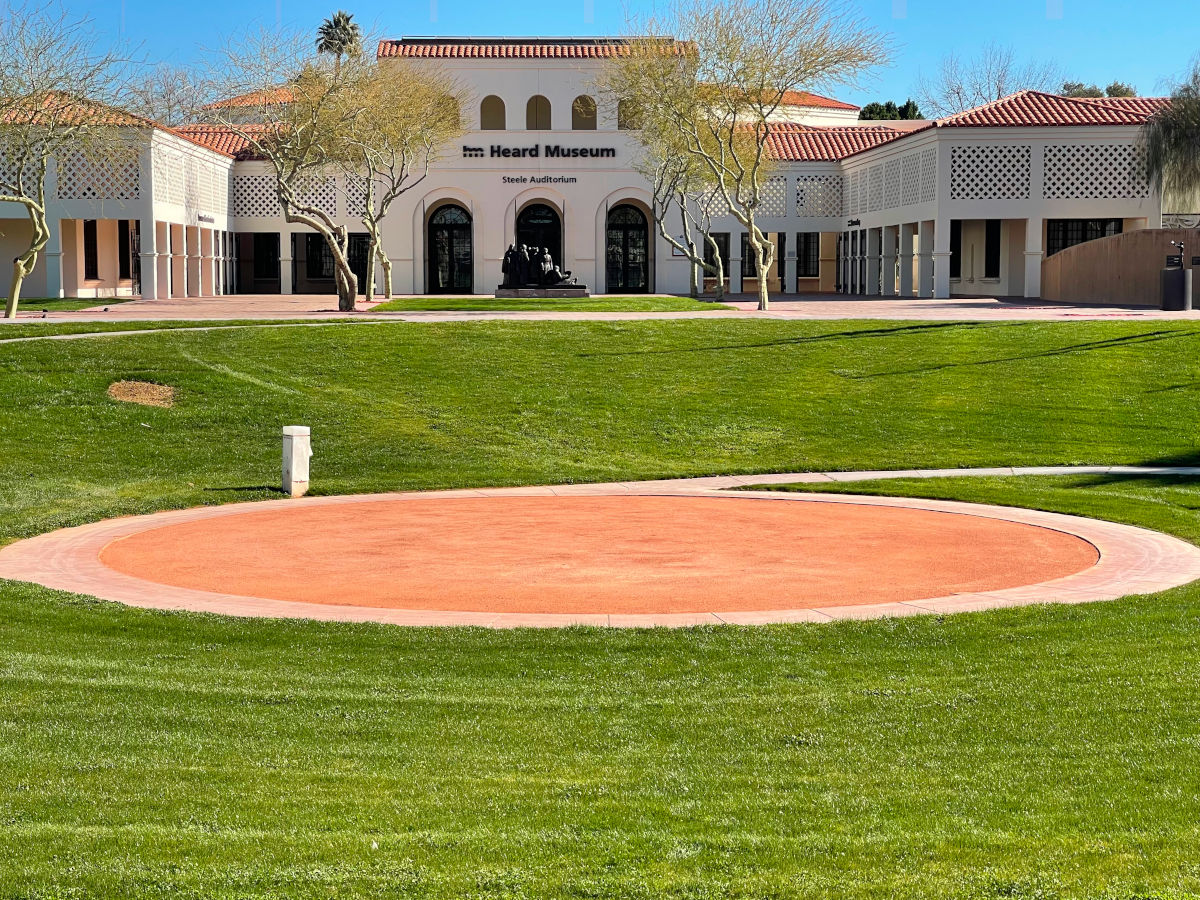
Libby Amphitheater

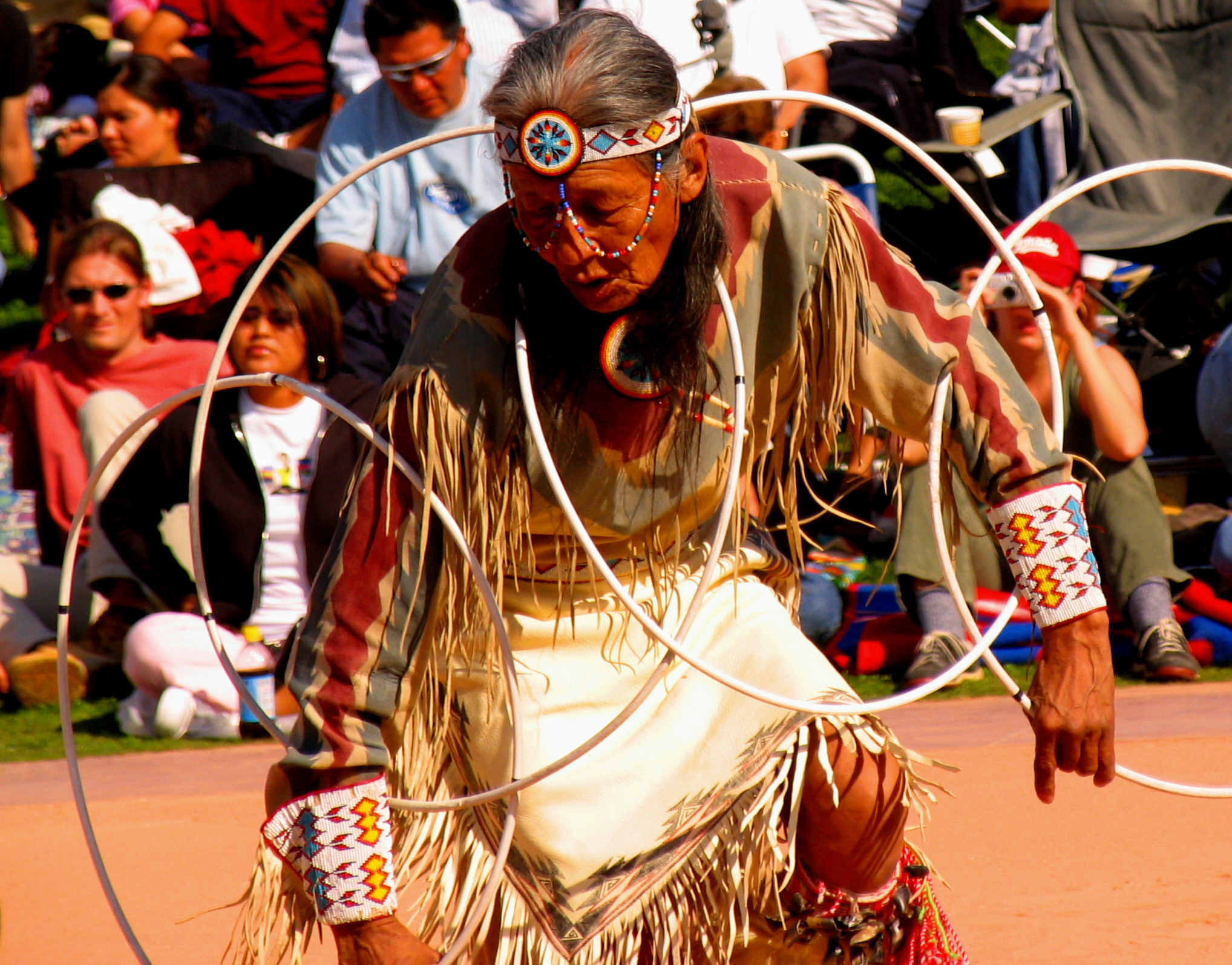
Hoop Dancer 2005

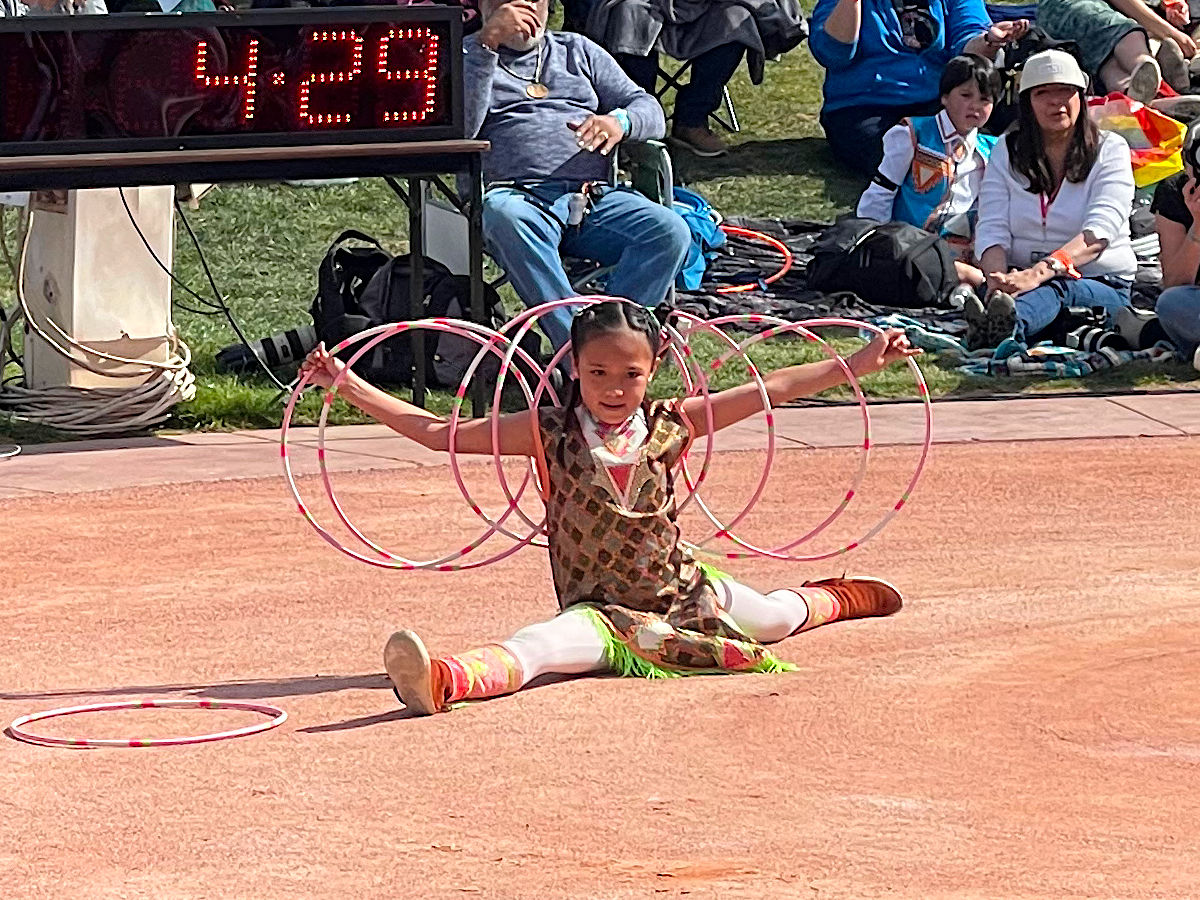
Hoop Dancer 2023

The Annual Heard Museum Guild Indian Fair and Market, a juried art fair and festival, has been held yearly since 1958. The Indian Fair and Market is held annually in March draws in 15,000 visitors and features over 600 Native American artists, and includes a juried competition for the best artwork of the fair appropriately called "Best of Show." Approved artists compete in eight classifications: Jewelry and Lapidary Work; Pottery; Paintings, Drawings, Graphics, Photography; Wooden Carvings; Sculpture; Textiles/Weavings/Clothing; Diverse Art Forms; Baskets.

The judges of this competition come from a diverse range of occupations including experienced artists, museum curators, gallery directors, and art collectors. All have in-depth experience in judging artwork, and the majority of these judges come from American Indian tribes. Awards and cash prizes are given for Best of Show, Best of Division (first and second place), and an additional Conrad House award. The judges also confer a Judge's Choice ribbon and an Honorable Mention ribbon.

== American Indian Veterans National Memorial ==
Next to the Libby Amphitheater is the American Indian Veterans National Memorial. The memorial consists of 4 bronze-colored panels honoring American Indian veterans, and 3 sculptures by Chiricahua Apache sculptor Allan Houser and Santa Clara Pueblo sculptor Michael Naranjo.

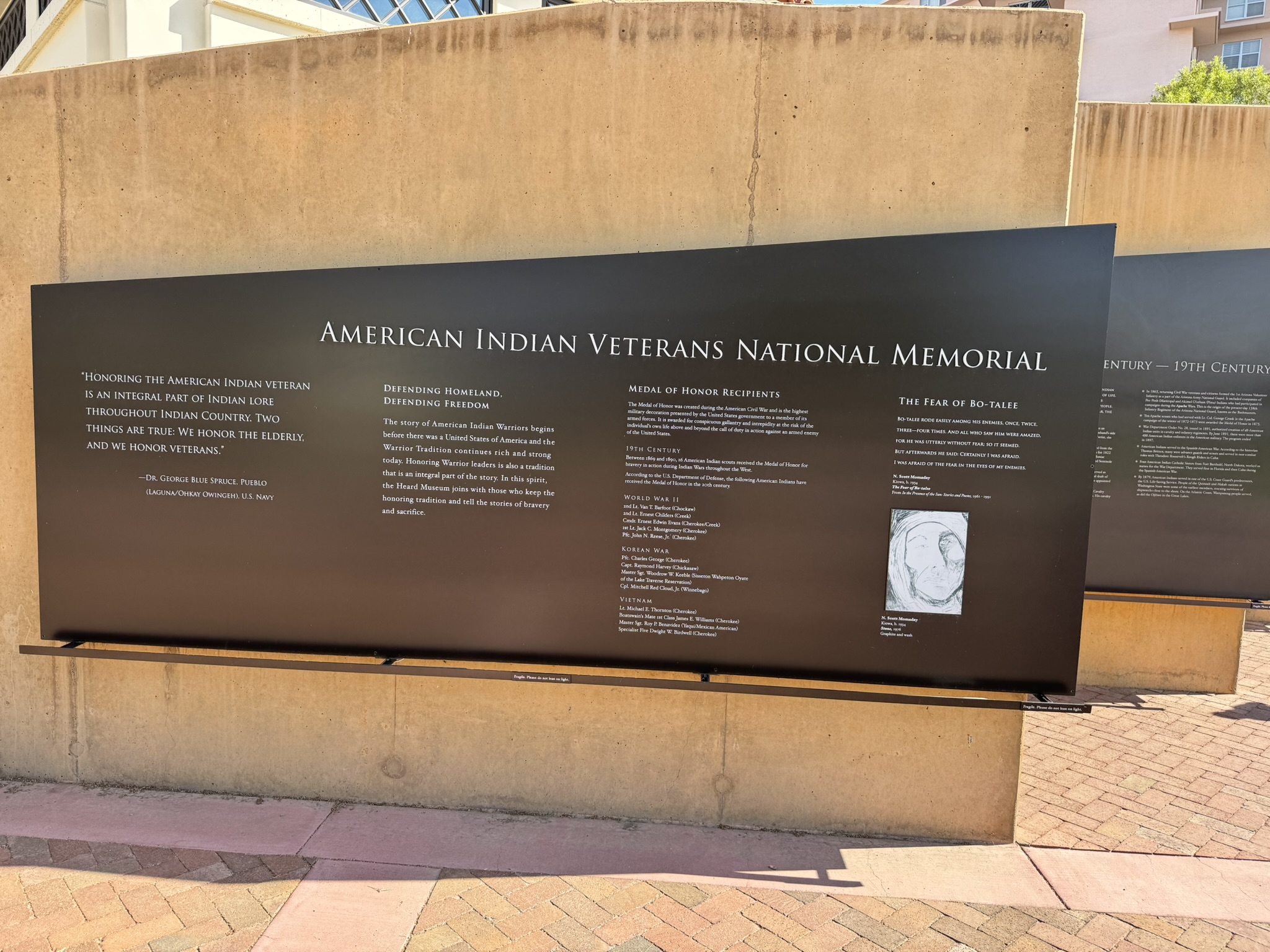
Main panel

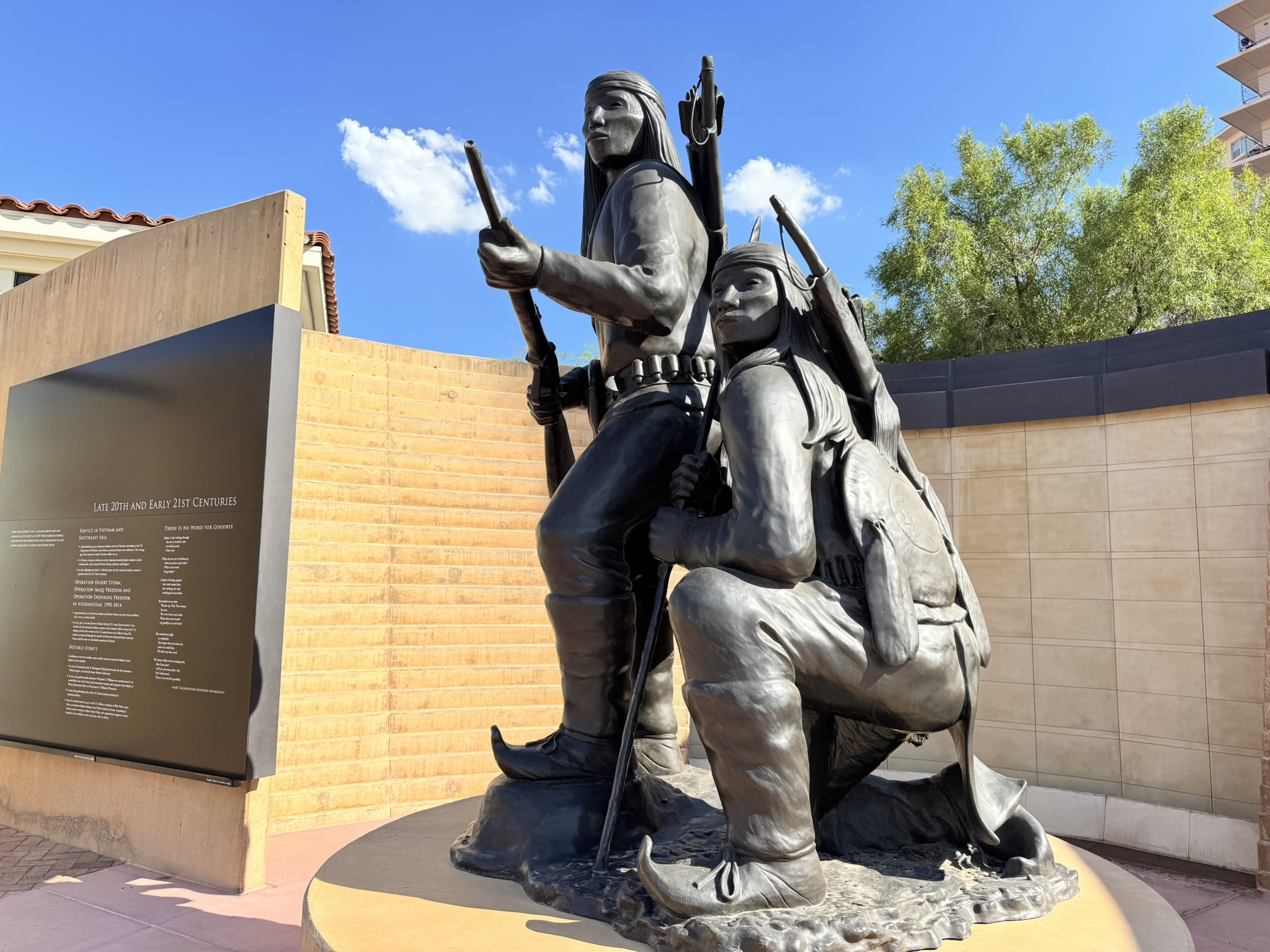
Unconquered II sculpture

== See also ==
- List of historic properties in Phoenix, Arizona
