= List of Native American artists =

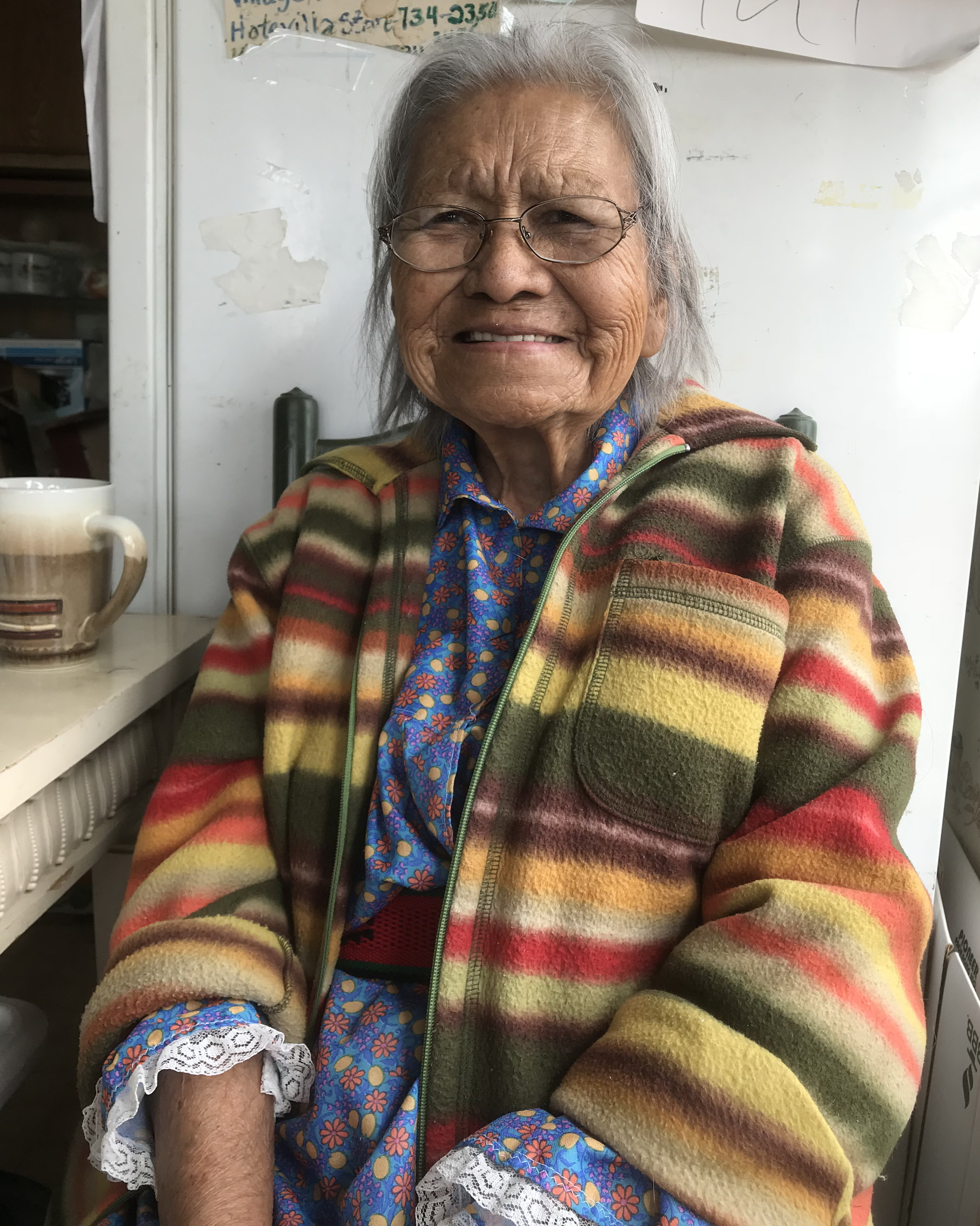
Dextra Quotskuyva, Hopi ceramic artist

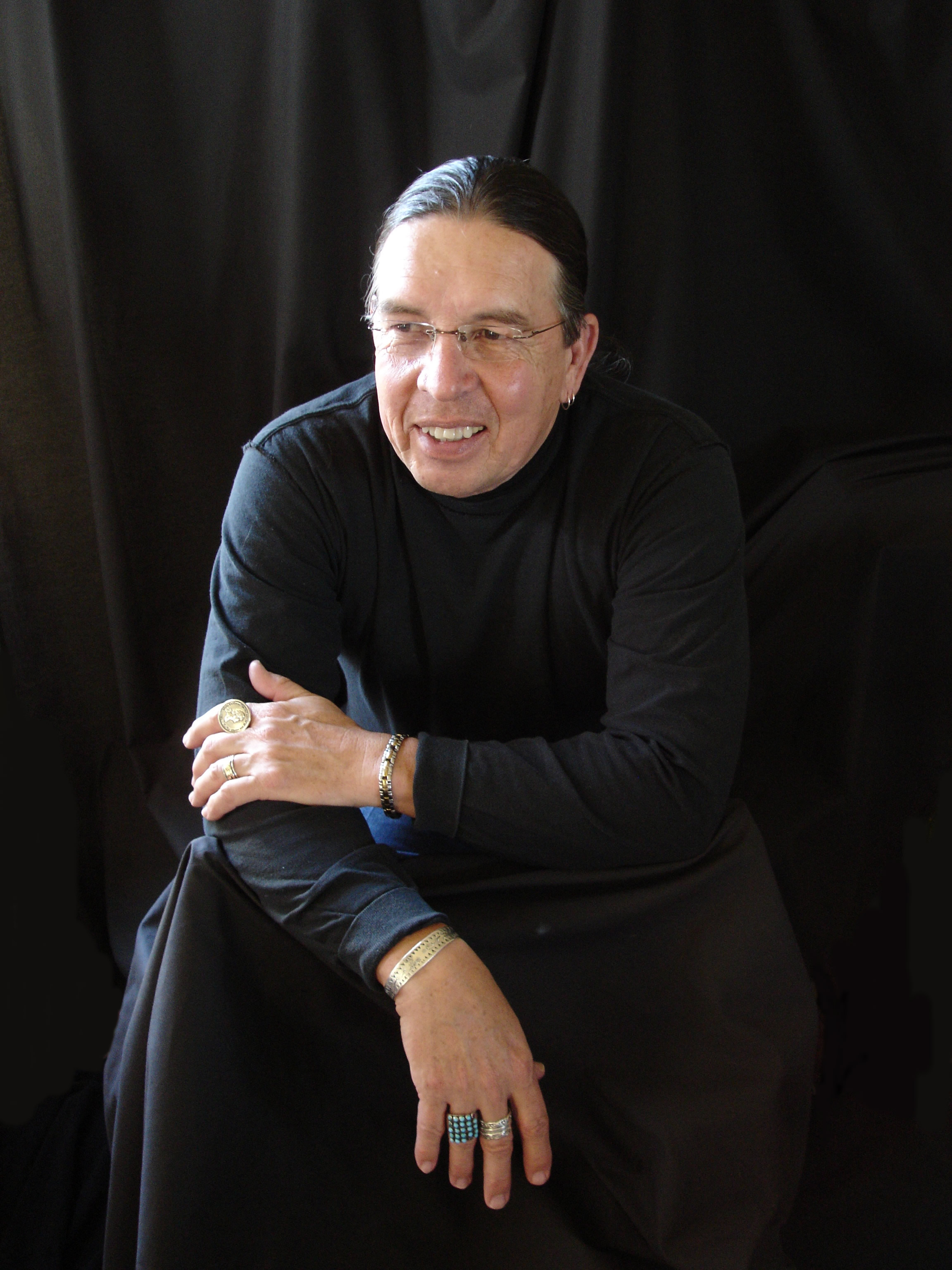
Harvey Pratt, Cheyenne and Arapaho Tribes painter, draftsman, and sculptor, who designed the National Native American Veterans Memorial in Washington, DC

This is a list of visual artists who are Native Americans in the United States. The Indian Arts and Crafts Act of 1990 defines "Native American" as being enrolled in either federally recognized tribes or state recognized tribes or "an individual certified as an Indian artisan by an Indian Tribe." This does not include non-Native American artists using Native American themes. Additions to the list need to reference a recognized, documented source and specifically name tribal affiliation according to federal and state lists. Indigenous American artists outside the United States can be found at List of indigenous artists of the Americas.

== Basket makers ==
- Elsie Allen, Cloverdale Pomo
- Annie Antone, Tohono O'odham
- Mary Knight Benson, Pomo, (1877–1930)
- William Ralganal Benson, Pomo, (1862–1937)
- Carrie Bethel, Mono Lake Paiute
- Susan Billy, Hopland Band Pomo
- Mary Holiday Black, Navajo (ca. 1934–2022)
- Sally Black, Diné (Navajo)
- Loren Bommelyn, Smith River Tolowa
- Nellie Charlie, Mono Lake Paiute
- Chipeta, Uncompahgre Ute (c. 1843–1924)
- Kelly Church, Gun Lake Potawatomi
- Mike Dart, Cherokee Nation (born 1977)
- Lena Frank Dick, Washoe (ca. 1889 - 1965)
- Mavis Doering, Cherokee Nation (1929–2007)
- Joe Feddersen, Okanagan/Sinixt (born 1953)
- Jeremy Frey, Penobscot (born 1978)
- Iva Honyestewa, Hopi (born 1964)
- Terrol Dew Johnson, Tohono O'odham
- Yvonne Walker Keshick, Little Traverse Odawa (born 1946)
- Louisa Keyser (Dat So La Lee), Washoe (c. 1829/1850–1925)
- Mary Leaf, Mohawk (1925–2004)
- Julia Marden, Aquinnah Wampanoag
- Sarah Jim Mayo (1858–1918), Washoe
- Mabel McKay, Pomo/Patwin (1907–1993)
- Geo Soctomah Neptune, Passamaquoddy
- Julia Parker, Coast Miwok/Kashaya Pomo (born 1929)
- Essie Parrish, Kashaya Pomo (1902–1979)
- Christine Navarro Paul, Chitimacha, (1874–1946)
- Sheila Kanieson Ransom (b. 1954) Akwesasne
- April Stone, Lake Superior Chippewa
- Boeda Strand, Snohomish
- Lucy Telles, Mono Lake Paiute/Miwok

== Beadwork and quillwork artists ==
- Tahnee Ahtone, Kiowa/Muscogee/Seminole
- Richard Aitson, Kiowa/Kiowa Apache beadwork artist (1953–2022)
- Marcus Amerman, Choctaw Nation of Oklahoma
- Imogene Goodshot Arquero (Oglala Lakota), beadwork artist
- Martha Berry, Cherokee Nation
- Carla Hemlock, Mohawk
- Sarah Ortegon HighWalking, Eastern Shoshone and Northern Arapaho
- Rhonda Holy Bear, Cheyenne River Lakota, sculptor, beadworker, dollmaker, born 1959
- Joyce Growing Thunder Fogarty, Assiniboine-Sioux
- Juanita Growing Thunder Fogarty, Assiniboine-Sioux
- Teri Greeves, Kiowa
- Vanessa Jennings, Kiowa/Kiowa Apache/Gila River Pima
- Maude Kegg, Mille Lacs Ojibwe (1904–1996)
- Yvonne Walker Keshick, Little Traverse Odawa (born 1946)
- Katrina Mitten, Miami Tribe of Oklahoma beadwork artist
- Elias Not Afraid, (born 1990)[1] Apsáalooke (Crow/Absaroke) artist known for his traditional and non-traditional beadwork, (born 1990)
- Jamie Okuma, Luiseño/Shoshone-Bannock
- Emily Waheneka, Warm Springs/Wasco/Paiute (1919–2008)

== Ceramic artists and potters ==
- Aguilar Family, Kewa Pueblo (Santo Domingo)
- Mrs. Ramos Aguilar, Kewa Pueblo (Santo Domingo)
- Tammie Allen (Walking Spirit), Jicarilla Apache
- Nathan Begaye, Navajo, Hopi
- Asuncion Aguilar Cate, Kewa Pueblo
- Crucita Gonzales Calabaza (Blue Corn), San Ildefonso Pueblo
- Marie Chino, Acoma
- Vera Chino, Acoma
- Rachel Concho, Acoma
- Helen Quintana Cordero, Cochiti Pueblo
- Arthur and Hilda Coriz, Kewa Pueblo (Santo Domingo)
- Juanita Suazo Dubray, Taos Pueblo
- Anthony Durand, Picuris Pueblo
- Cora Durand, Picuris Pueblo (1902–1998)
- Betty Gaedtke, Quapaw
- Felipita Aguilar Garcia, Kewa Pueblo
- Tammy Garcia, Santa Clara Pueblo (born 1969)
- Bill Glass Jr., Cherokee Nation
- Rose Gonzales, Ohkay Owingeh Pueblo
- Luther Gutierrez, Santa Clara Pueblo (1911–1987)
- Margaret Gutierrez, Santa Clara Pueblo (born 1936)
- Laurencita Herrera, Cochiti Pueblo
- Daisy Hooee, Hopi-Tewa
- Lisa Holt, Cochiti Pueblo
- Michael Kanteena, Laguna Pueblo
- Lucy M. Lewis, Acoma Pueblo
- Otellie Loloma, Hopi (1921–1993)
- Joseph Lonewolf, Santa Clara Pueblo (1932–2014)
- Julian Martinez, San Ildefonso Pueblo (1879–1943)
- Maria Montoya Martinez (Poveka), San Ildefonso Pueblo (1887–1980)
- Maria Ramita Martinez, Picuris Pueblo (1884–1969)
- Grace Medicine Flower, Santa Clara Pueblo
- Helen Naha ("Feather Woman"), Hopi (1922–1993)
- Tyra Naha, Hopi
- Priscilla Namingha Hopi-Tewa (1924–2008)
- Nampeyo (Iris Nampeyo), Hopi-Tewa/Hopi (c. 1859–1942)
- Elva Nampeyo, Hopi
- Fannie Nampeyo, Hopi
- Dextra Nampeyo Quotskuyva, Hopi-Tewa
- Jody Naranjo, Santa Clara Pueblo
- Nora Naranjo Morse, Santa Clara Pueblo
- Joy Navasie, Hopi-Tewa (1919–2012)
- Inez Ortiz, Cochiti Pueblo
- Al Qöyawayma, Hopi
- Harlan Reano, Kewa Pueblo (Santo Domingo)
- Ida Redbird, Maricopa/Halchidhoma (1892–1971)
- Jeri Redcorn, Caddo/Citizen Potawatomi, (born ca. 1940)
- Diego Romero, Cochiti Pueblo
- Ida Sahmie, Navajo
- Gwen Setalla, Hopi
- Linda and Merton Sisneros, Santa Clara Pueblo
- Anita Suazo, Santa Clara Pueblo (born 1937)
- Roxanne Swentzell, Santa Clara Pueblo
- Margaret Tafoya, (1904–2001) Santa Clara Pueblo
- Sara Fina Tafoya, Santa Clara Pueblo, (1863–1949)
- Leonidas Tapia, Ohkay Owingeh Pueblo
- Robert Tenorio, Kewa Pueblo (Santo Domingo) (born 1950)
- Mary Ellen Toya, Jemez Pueblo (1934–1990)
- Faye Tso, Navajo (1933–2004)
- Lonnie Vigil, Nambé Pueblo
- Nathan Youngblood, Santa Clara Pueblo

== Diverse cultural artists ==
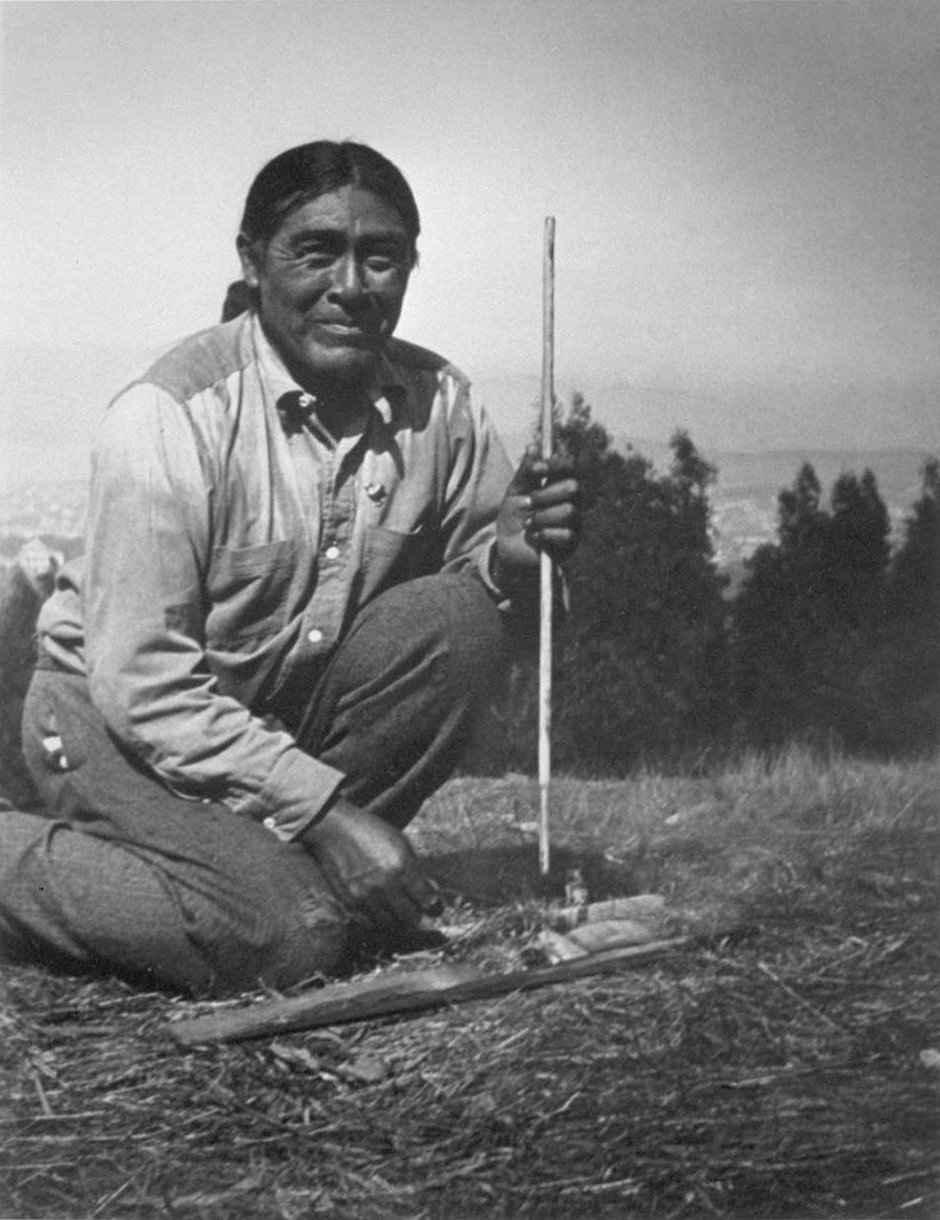
Ishi (Yahi, ca. 1861 – March 25, 1916)

- David Moses Bridges (Passamaquoddy, 1962–2017), birchbark artist, canoe maker
- Nora Thompson Dean (Touching Leaves Woman, Delaware), (1907–1984)
- Ishi, Yahi (ca. 1860–1916), bowmaker and flintknapper
- Vanessa Jennings, Kiowa/Kiowa Apache/Gila River Pima (born 1952)
- Tomah Joseph (Passamaquoddy, 1837–1914), birchbark artist, canoe maker
- Charles Littleleaf, Blackfoot/Warm Springs, flute maker
- Tom Mauchahty-Ware, Kiowa-/Comanche, flute maker
- Scarface Charley, Modoc (ca. 1851–1896), linguist and furniture-maker
- Hastings Shade, Cherokee Nation, marble- and gig-maker
- Tommy Wildcat, Cherokee Nation, flute and rattle maker

== Fashion designers ==
- Loren Aragon, Acoma Pueblo
- Felix Earle, Diné Navajo Nation
- Patricia Michaels, Taos Pueblo
- Ardina Moore (1930–2022), Quapaw/Osage
- Lloyd Kiva New (1916–2002), Cherokee Nation
- Bethany Yellowtail (born 1989) Northern Cheyenne/Crow
- Jamie Okuma (born 1977), Luiseño/Shoshone-Bannock
- Virgil Ortiz (born 1969), Cochiti Pueblo

== Glass artists ==
- Marcus Amerman, Choctaw Nation of Oklahoma
- Preston Singletary, Tlingit

== Installation and new genres artists ==
- Natalie Ball (born 1980), Klamath/Modoc
- Sarah Biscarra-Dilley, Northern Chumash
- Raven Chacon, Navajo Nation, (born 1977)
- Corwin Clairmont, Confederated Salish and Kootenai Tribes of the Flathead Nation
- Gerald Clarke, Cahuilla
- Joe Feddersen, Confederated Tribes of the Colville Reservation (Okanagan) (born 1953)
- Nicholas Galanin, Tlingit/Unangax
- Virgil Ortiz (born 1969), Cochiti Pueblo
- Truman Lowe, Ho-Chunk (1944–2019)
- Cannupa Hanska Luger (born 1979) Mandan/Hidatsa/Arikara/Lakota
- James Luna, Luiseño (1950–2018)
- Da-ka-xeen Mehner, Tlingit/Nisga'a
- Bently Spang, Northern Cheyenne, (born 1960)
- Nora Naranjo Morse, Santa Clara Pueblo (born 1953)
- Wendy Red Star, Apsáalooke (Crow) (born 1981)
- Santiago X, Louisiana Coushatta, multidisplinary artist, architect
- Charlene Teters, Spokane (born 1952)
- Marie Watt, Seneca (born 1967)
- Richard Ray Whitman, Yuchi/Muscogee
- Holly Wilson (Delaware Nation/Cherokee, born 1968)
- Postcommodity, multidisplinary art collective, (born 2007)

== Metalsmiths and jewelers ==
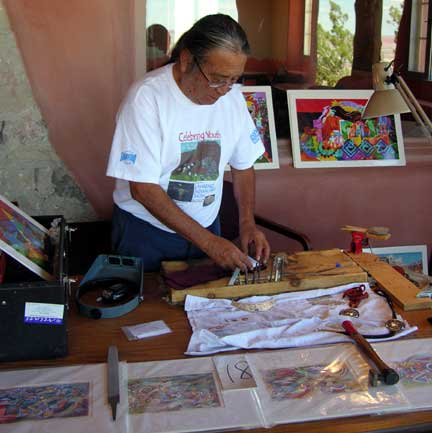
Michael Kabotie (Hopi, 1942–2009) jeweler and painter

- Narciso Abeyta, Navajo (1918–1998)
- Keri Ataumbi, Kiowa (born 1971)
- Klee Benally, Navajo (1975–2023)
- Heidi BigKnife, Shawnee (born 1967)
- Gail Bird, Kewa Pueblo-Laguna Pueblo (born 1949)
- Gomeo Bobelu, Zuni (1964–2022)
- Ben Nighthorse Campbell, Cheyenne (born 1943)
- Della Casa Appa, Zuni (1889–1963)
- Bernard Dawahoya (Masaqueva), Hopi (c.1935–2011)
- Yazzie Johnson, Navajo (born 1946)
- Fred Kabotie, Hopi (c. 1900–1986)
- Michael Kabotie, Hopi (1942–2009)
- Ruddell Laconsello, Diné (born 1959) and Nancy Laconsello, A:shiwi (Zuni) (born 1952); artist team
- Charles Loloma, Hopi (1921–1991)
- Angie Reano Owen, Kewa Pueblo (born 1946)
- Atsidi Sani, "Old Smith", Navajo (c. 1828–1918)
- Emory Sekaquaptewa, Hopi (1928–2007)
- Sequoyah, Cherokee (c. 1767–1843)
- Tommy Singer, Navajo (1940–2014)
- Orville Tsinnie, Diné (1943–2017)
- Linda Yamane, Rumsien/Ohlone (born 1949)

== Mixed-media artists ==
- Fawn Douglas (Las Vegas Paiute), mixed-media artist, curator
- Courtney M. Leonard (Shinnecock Indian Nation), ceramicist, mixed-media artist, filmmaker
- Melissa Melero-Moose (Northern Paiute/Modoc) mixed-media artist, curator
- Rose B. Simpson (Santa Clara Pueblo Tewa) mixed-media artist and sculptor
- Brian D. Tripp (Karuk Tribe, 1945–2022)

== Painters ==
- Jim Abeita, Navajo (born 1947)
- Narciso Abeyta, Navajo (1918–1998)
- Arthur Amiotte, Oglala Lakota
- Avelino Arquero, Cochiti Pueblo
- Tirador Armstrong, Cheyenne/Caddo (1935–2010)
- Spencer Asah (Lallo), Kiowa, one of the Kiowa Six (c. 1905–1954)
- Gilbert Benjamin Atencio, San Ildefonso Pueblo (1930–1995)
- Pat Atencio, San Ildefonso Pueblo (1932–2009)
- Tony Atencio, San Ildefonso Pueblo (1928–1995)
- James Auchiah, Kiowa, one of the Kiowa Six (1906–1974)
- Frank Austin, Navajo (1938–2017)
- Amos Bad Heart Bull (Tatanka Cante Sica), Oglala Lakota Sioux
- Margarete Bagshaw, Santa Clara Pueblo-descent (1964–2015)
- Rick Bartow, Wiyot (1946–2016)
- Stanley Battese, Navajo (born 1936)
- Fred Beaver (Eka La Nee), Muscogee Creek/Seminole (1911–1980)
- Clifford Beck, Navajo (1946–1995)
- Timothy Bedah, Navajo (1945–2017)
- Apie Begay, Navajo (died 1936)
- Arthur C. Begay, Navajo (1932–2010)
- Harrison Begay (Haskay Yahne Yah), Navajo (1914/1917–2012)
- Keats Begay, Navajo (1923–1987)
- Noah Billie, Seminole (1948–2000)
- Black Hawk, Sans Arc Lakota (c. 1832–c. 1890)
- Archie Blackowl (Mistamootova), Southern Cheyenne (1911–1992)
- Acee Blue Eagle (Alex C. McIntosh, Chebon Ahbula), Muscogee Creek
- Roy Boney Jr., Cherokee Nation
- David Bradley, White Earth Ojibwe
- Gibson Byrd, Shawnee Tribe (1923–2002)
- T.C. Cannon (Pai-doung-u-day), Kiowa/Caddo
- Pop Chalee (Merina Lujan), Taos Pueblo (1906–1993)
- Robert Chee, Navajo (1937–1972)
- Adele Collins, Chickasaw painter, (1908–1996)
- Jesse Cornplanter, Seneca (1889–1957)
- Woody Crumbo, Citizen Potawatomi (1912–1939)
- David Cusick, Tuscarora (c. 1786–1831), painter and author
- Dennis Cusick, Tuscarora (c. 1800–1824) painter
- Talmadge Davis, Cherokee Nation (1962–2005)
- Frank Day, Bald Rock Konkow Maidu (1902–1976)
- Angel De Cora (Hinook-Mahiwi-Kilinaka), Winnebago (1871–1919)
- Gregg Deal, Pyramid Lake Paiute Tribe
- Jim Denomie, Lac Courte Oreilles Ojibwe (1955–2022)
- Patrick DesJarlait Red Lake Ojibwe painter (1923–1973)
- Cecil Dick (Dagadahga), Cherokee Nation (1915–1992)
- Margaret Dillard, Chickasaw
- Dohasan, Kiowa (ca. 1740s–1866)
- Robert Draper, Navajo (1938–2000)
- Bunky Echo-Hawk, Yakama/Pawnee (born 1975)
- Joseph Erb, Cherokee Nation (born 1974)
- Harry Fonseca, Maidu
- Carl Nelson Gorman (Kin-Ya-Onny-Beyeh), Navajo (1907–1998)
- R.C. Gorman, Navajo (1932–2005)
- Franklin Gritts, Keetoowah Cherokee (1914–1996)
- Enoch Kelly Haney, Seminole/Muscogee (1940–2022)
- Helen Hardin (Tsa-Sah-Wee-Eh), Santa Clara Pueblo (1943–1984)
- Albert Harjo, Muscogee Creek (1937–2019)
- Benjamin Harjo Jr., Absentee Shawnee/Seminole (1945–2023)
- Sharron Ahtone Harjo, Kiowa (born 1945)
- Hachivi Edgar Heap of Birds, Southern Cheyenne
- Joan Hill (Cheasequah), Muscogee Creek/Cherokee (1930–2020)
- Jack Hokeah, Kiowa, one of the Kiowa Six (1902–1969)
- Michael Horse, Apache/Yaqui-descent
- Lynnette Haozous, Chiricahua Apache/Navajo/Taos Pueblo
- Allan Houser (Haozous), Chiricahua Apache
- Norma Howard, Choctaw Nation/Mississippi Choctaw/Chickasaw
- Oscar Howe (Mazuha Hokshina), Yanktonai Dakota (1915–1983)
- Howling Wolf, Southern Cheyenne (1849–1927)
- Sharon Irla, Cherokee Nation (born 1957)
- David Johns, Navajo (born 1948)
- Ruthe Blalock Jones (Chu-Lun-Dit), Shawnee/Peoria
- Fred Kabotie (Naqavoy'ma), Hopi (1900–1986)
- Michael Kabotie, Hopi (1942–2009)
- Betty Keener Archuleta, Cherokee Nation (1928–1998)
- Kicking Bear, Oglala Lakota (1846–1904)
- Sylvia Lark, Seneca (1947–1990)
- James Lavadour, Walla Walla
- Annie Little Warrior, also Annie Red Tomahawk, Hunkpapa Lakota (1895–1966)
- Judith Lowry, Maidu/Pit River tribes
- Albert Looking Elk, Taos Pueblo (c. 1888–1940)
- Albert Lujan, Taos Pueblo (1892–1948)
- Oren Lyons, Seneca Nation (born 1930)
- Julian Martinez, San Ildefonso Pueblo (1897–1943)
- Mario Martinez, Yaqui (born 1953)
- Solomon McCombs, Muscogee Creek (1913–1980)
- Douglas Miles, San Carlos Apache/Akimel O'odham
- Juan Mirabal, Taos Pueblo (1903–1970)
- Isabel Montoya, San Ildefonso Pueblo (1899–1996)
- Stephen Mopope (Qued Koi), Kiowa, one of the Kiowa Six (1898–1974)
- George Morrison, Ojibwe (1919–2000)
- Naiche, Chiricahua Apache (c. 1857–1919)
- Gerald Nailor, Sr. (Toh Yah, "Walking by the River"), Navajo
- Dan Namingha, Hopi
- Jackson Narcomey, Muscogee Creek/Seminole, (1942–2012)
- Doc Tate Nevaquaya (Comanche Nation, 1932–1996)
- Lloyd Kiva New, Cherokee Nation, (1916–2002)
- Bonita Wa Wa Calachaw Nuñez (1888–1972)
- Diane O'Leary, Comanche, (1939–2013)
- Fernando Padilla, Jr., San Felipe Pueblo/Navajo
- Tonita Peña, (Quah Ah) San Ildefonso Pueblo (1893–1949)
- St. David Pendleton Oakerhater (Making Medicine), Southern Cheyenne, (c. 1847–1931)
- Oqwa Pi, (Abel Sanchez, Red Cloud), San Ildefonso Pueblo (1899–1971)
- Sanford Plummer, Seneca (1905–1974)
- Harvey Pratt (Wo-Pet-No-No-Mot, White Thunder), Cheyenne-Arapaho
- Joseph Rael (Tslew-teh-koyeh "Beautiful Painted Arrow), Picuris Pueblo/Ute
- Kevin Red Star, Crow Nation
- Mateo Romero, Cochiti Pueblo
- Paladine Roye (Pon Cee Cee), Ponca (1946–2001)
- Will Sampson, Muscogee Creek (1933–1987)
- Percy Tsisete Sandy (Kai-Sa "Red Moon"), Zuni Pueblo, (1918–1974)
- Duane Slick, Meskwaki/Fox/Ho-Chunk (born 1961)
- Fritz Scholder, La Jolla Luiseño (1937–2005)
- Silver Horn (Haungooah) Kiowa (1860–1940)
- Jaune Quick-To-See Smith, Salish-Kootenai/Métis/Cree, Shoshone/Bannock
- Lois Smoky Kaulaity (Bougetah), Kiowa, one of the Kiowa Six (1907–1981)
- Ernest Spybuck (Maythela), Absentee Shawnee (1883–1949)
- Virginia Stroud, Keetoowah Cherokee/Muscogee
- Carl Sweezy, Southern Arapaho (1881–1953)
- Moses Stranger Horse, Brulé Lakota (1890–1941)
- Quincy Tahoma (Water's Edge), Navajo (1920–1956)
- Tichkematse, (Cheyenne and Arapaho Tribes) (1857–1932)
- Jerome Tiger (Kocha), Muscogee Creek/Seminole
- Johnny Tiger, Jr., Muscogee Creek/Seminole (1940–2015)
- Brian D. Tripp, Karuk Tribe (1945–2022)
- Monroe Tsatoke, Kiowa, one of the Kiowa Six (1904–1937)
- Awa Tsireh (Alfonso Roybal), San Ildefonso Pueblo (1898–1955)
- Frank Tuttle, Concow Maidu/Yuki/Wailaki (born 1951)
- Pablita Velarde (Tse Tsan), Santa Clara Pueblo (1918–2006)
- Kay WalkingStick, Cherokee Nation
- Paul War Cloud (1930–1973)
- Pop Wea (Lori Tanner), Taos Pueblo (died 1966)
- Dick West (Wah-pah-nah-yah), Southern Cheyenne (1912–1996)
- White Horse (Tsen-tainte), Kiowa (died 1892)
- Dyani White Hawk, Sicangu Lakota (born 1976)
- Emmi Whitehorse, Navajo
- Elizabeth Woody, Navajo/Tenino (Warm Springs)/Wasco/Yakama (born 1959)
- Beatien Yazz, Navajo
- Melanie Yazzie, Navajo

== Performance artists ==
- Marcus Amerman, Choctaw Nation of Oklahoma
- Gregg Deal, Pyramid Lake Paiute
- James Luna, Payómkawichum/Ipi/Mexican-American (1950–2018)
- Rosy Simas, Seneca Nation of Indians, Heron clan

== Photographers ==
- Dugan Aguilar, Paiute/Pit River/Maidu (1947–2018)
- Jennie Ross Cobb, Cherokee (1881–1959)
- Jeremy Dennis, Shinecock
- Jean Fredericks, Hopi (1906–1990)
- Shan Goshorn, Eastern Band Cherokee (1957–2018)
- Benjamin Haldane, Tsimshian (1874–1941)
- Sally Larsen, Apache/Alutiiq
- Lee Marmon, Laguna Pueblo (1925–2021)
- Parker McKenzie, Kiowa (1897–1999)
- Larry McNeil, Tlingit/Nisga'a (born 1955)
- Shelley Niro, Mohawk (born 1954)
- Horace Poolaw, Kiowa (1906–1984)
- Camille Seaman, Shinnecock (born 1969)
- Sarah Sense, Chitimacha / Choctaw (born1980)
- Richard Throssel Cree (1882–1933)
- Hulleah Tsinhnahjinnie, Muscogee/Seminole/Navajo (born 1954)
- Richard Ray Whitman, Yuchi/Muscogee Creek
- Matika Wilbur, Tulalip Tribes/Swinomish people (born 1984)
- Will Wilson, Navajo (born 1969)
- Zoë Marieh Urness (photographer) Tlingit (born 1984)

== Printmakers ==
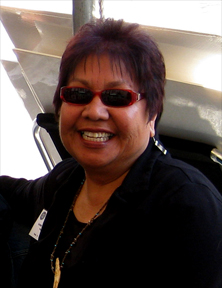
Linda Lomahaftewa

- Natalie Ball, Klamath/Modoc, (born 1980)
- T.C. Cannon (Pai-doung-u-day), Kiowa/Caddo
- R.C. Gorman, Navajo (1932–2005)
- Benjamin Harjo Jr., Absentee Shawnee/Seminole Tribe of Oklahoma
- Hachivi Edgar Heap of Birds, Southern Cheyenne
- Debora Iyall, Cowlitz (born 1954)
- Frank LaPena, Nomtipom/Wintu (1937–2019), printmaker, painter, woodworker
- James Lavadour, Walla Walla
- Linda Lomahaftewa, Hopi/Choctaw
- Michael McCabe (1961–2023), Diné (Navajo)
- Jaune Quick-To-See Smith, Salish-Kootenai/ Métis/Shoshone-Bannock
- Melanie Yazzie, Navajo

== Sculptors ==
- Rick Bartow, Wiyot/Yurok (1946–2016)
- Blackbear Bosin, Comanche/Kiowa (1921–1980)
- Amanda Crowe, Eastern Band Cherokee (1928–2004)
- Cliff Fragua, Jemez Pueblo
- Tammy Garcia, Santa Clara Pueblo (born 1969)
- Bob Haozous, Chiricahua Apache (born 1943)
- Allan Houser (Haozous), Chiricahua Apache (1914–1994)
- Nathan Jackson, Tlingit (born 1938)
- Margaret E. Jacobs, Mohawk
- Edmonia Lewis, Mississauga Ojibwe (c. 1844–1907)
- Nora Naranjo Morse, Santa Clara Pueblo (born 1953)
- Harvey Pratt (Wo-Pet-No-No-Mot, "White Thunder"), Cheyenne and Arapaho Tribes (1941–2025)
- Lawney Reyes, Sinixt
- Ronald Senungetuk, Iñupiaq (1933–2020)
- Russell Spears, Narragansett (1917–2009)
- Roxanne Swentzell, Santa Clara Pueblo (born 1962)
- Ralph W. Sturges, Mohegan (1918–2007)
- Brian D. Tripp, Karuk Tribe (1945–2022)
- Marie Watt, Seneca (born 1967)
- Holly Wilson (Delaware Nation/Cherokee, born 1968)
- Melanie Yazzie, Navajo (born 1966)

== Textile artists ==
- Natalie Ball, Klamath/Modoc, (born 1980)
- D.Y. Begay, Navajo (born 1953)
- Hastiin Klah, Navajo (1867–1937)
- Lily Hope, Tlingit (born 1983)
- Ursala Hudson, Tlingit
- Carla Hemlock, Mohawk (born 1961)
- Julia Bah Joe (1875–1974)
- Julia Marden, Aquinnah Wampanoag
- Ardina Moore, Quapaw/Osage (1930–2022)
- Dora Old Elk, Apsáalooke/Sioux (born 1977)
- Jamie Okuma, Luiseño/Shoshone-Bannock (born 1977)
- Eric-Paul Riege, Navajo (born 1994)
- Clarissa Rizal, Tlingit (1956–2016)
- Marilou Schultz, Navajo (born 1954)
- Clara Sherman (Nezbah), Navajo (1914–2010)
- Tyrrell Tapaha, Diné
- Ska-ba-quay Tesson, Meskwaki (ca. 1846–1929)
- Jennie Thlunaut, Tlingit (1892–1986)

== Woodcarvers ==
- Amanda Crowe, Eastern Band Cherokee (1928–2004)
- Jesse Cornplanter, Seneca (1889–1957)
- Babe Hemlock, Mohawk (born 1961)
- Nathan Jackson, Tlingit (born 1938)
- Jewell James (Praying Wolf, Tse Sealth), Lummi (born 1953)
- James Schoppert, Tlingit (1947–1992)

== See also ==
- Native American art
- Timeline of Native American art history
- List of Native American women artists
- List of indigenous artists of the Americas
- List of Native American artists from Oklahoma
- Native Americans in the United States
- Native American women in the arts
- List of writers from peoples indigenous to the Americas
- Native American basketry
- Native American pottery
