= List of Native American women artists =

Native American women in the arts include the following notable individuals. This list article is of women visual artists who are Native Americans in the United States.

The Indian Arts and Crafts Act of 1990 defines "Native American" as those being enrolled in either federally recognized tribes or certain state-recognized tribes or "an individual certified as an Indian artisan by an Indian Tribe." This list does not include non-Native American women artists who use Native American themes or motifs in their work. Additions to the list need to reference a recognized, documented source and specifically name the tribal affiliation according to federal and state lists.

Native American artists are part of the Indigenous artists of the Americas.

== Basketry ==
- Linda Aguilar (born 1946), Chumash basket maker who incorporates non-traditional materials
- Elsie Allen (22 September 1899 – 31 December 1990), Pomo basket weaver.
- Annie Antone (born 1955), is a Native American Tohono O'odham basket weaver from Gila Bend, Arizona.
- Carrie Bethel (1898–1974) Kucadikadi (Northern Paiute) basketmaker
- Yvonne Walker Keshick (born 1946), Little Traverse Odawa quill artist and basket maker and 2014 National Endowment for the Arts National Heritage Fellow
- Mabel McKay, Pomo/Wintu/Patwin, born 1907 Nice, Lake County, California. Basket weaver.

== Beadwork ==
- Nellie Two Bear Gates (1854–1935), Iháŋktȟuŋwaŋna Dakota artist whose beadwork depicted the history and culture of her people.
- Sarah Ortegon HighWalking, Eastern Shoshone and Northern Arapaho
- Emily Waheneka, (born Kis-Sun-Y) Warm Springs, Wasco and Paiute. b. 1919 Simnasho, Oregon. Beadworking and sewn work, represented in the permanent collection of the Museum of Northwest Art, and others.

== Ceramics ==
- Mrs. Ramos Aguilar, potter from Santo Domingo Pueblo (currently known as Kewa Pueblo), New Mexico, United States.
- Rachel Concho (born 1936), Native American pottery from Acoma Pueblo
- Daisy Hooee, Hopi-Tewa potter who helped preserve traditional methods of pottery making.
- Tammy Garcia, Santa Clara Pueblo sculptor and ceramic artist
- Lucy M. Lewis (1890s–1992), Acoma Pueblo potter
- Maria Martinez, San Ildefonso Pueblo, born 1886 San Ildefonso. Potter.
- Nora Naranjo-Morse, Santa Clara Pueblo, born 1953 Espanola, New Mexico. Potter.
- Ida Sahmie (born 1960), Navajo ceramic artist known for combining Hopi traditional pottery with Navajo iconography.
- Margaret Tafoya (August 13, 1904 – February 25, 2001), Santa Clara Pueblo artist known for traditional pottery. Recipient of a 1984 National Heritage Fellowship.
- Sara Fina Tafoya, Santa Clara Pueblo (1863–1949)

== Installation arts ==
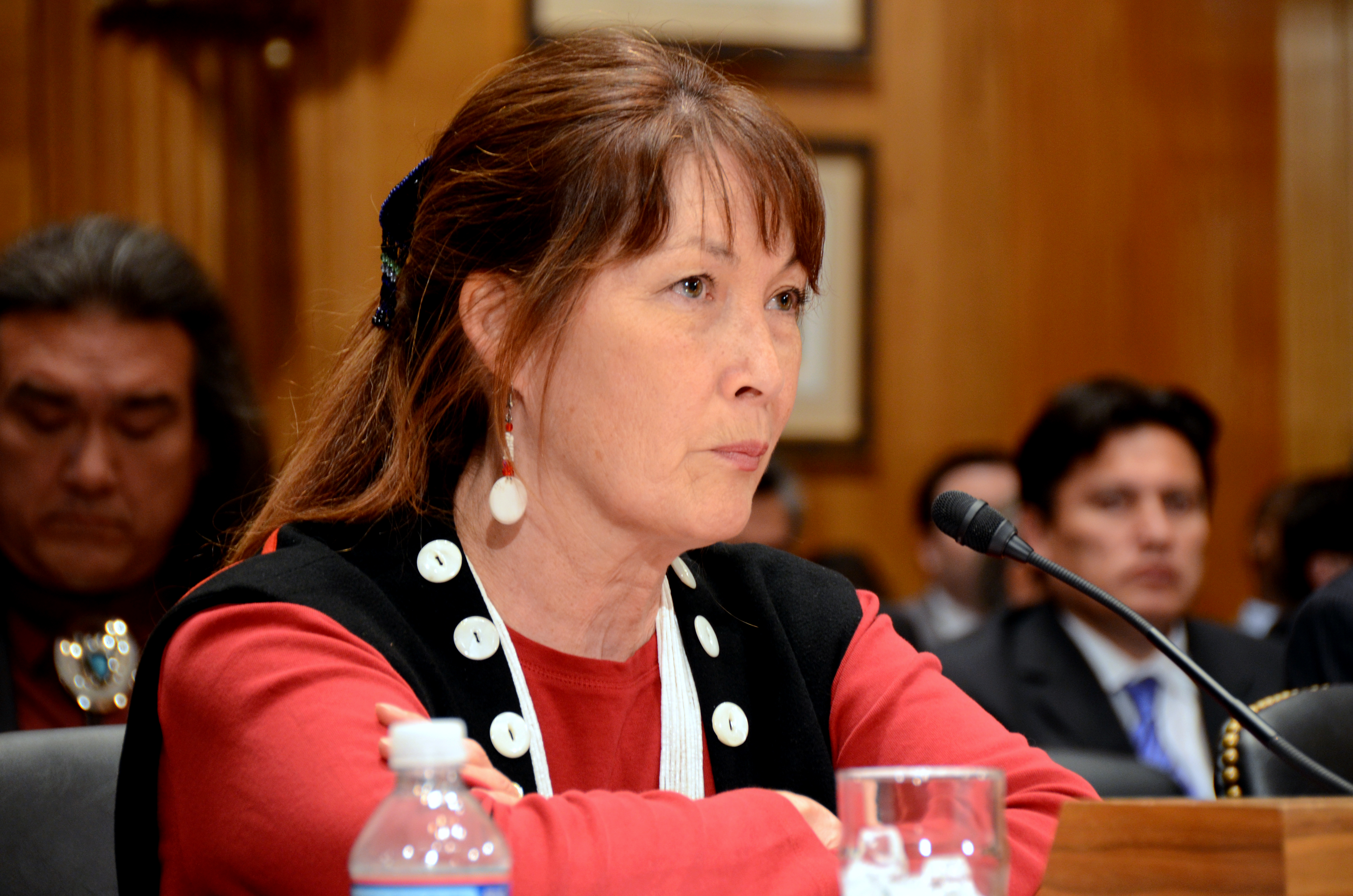
Charlene Teters in 2011

- Jaune Quick-to-See Smith, Salish/Cree/Shoshone, born 1940 St. Ignatius, Montana. BA art education, Framingham State College, 1976. MA art, UNM, 1980. Work includes 1996 Alki Beach Trail (Seattle) memorial markers and art installations and 1992 North Wind Fish Weir Project (Green River Trail, Seattle).
- Tanis Maria S'eiltin (born 1951), Tlingit installation artist, painter, printmaker, and sculptor
- Charlene Teters (Slum Tah), Spokane, born 1952 Spokane Reservation, Washington. Installation artist, painter, activist and educator.

== Jewelry ==
- Denise Wallace (born 1957, Seattle), Sugpiaq, Jeweler, lapidarian

== Mixed media ==
- Hulleah Tsinhnahjinnie, Seminole/Creek/Navajo. born 1954 Phoenix. attended IAIA. BFA California College of Arts and Crafts (Oakland). Instructor at IAIA, SF Art Inst, UC Davis, California College of Arts and Crafts. Mixed media.
- Sara Bates, Cherokee Nation, born 1944 Muskogee, Oklahoma BA Fine Art and Women's Studies, Cal State Bakersfield 1987; MFA Sculpture and Painting UCSB 1989, mixed media

== Painting ==
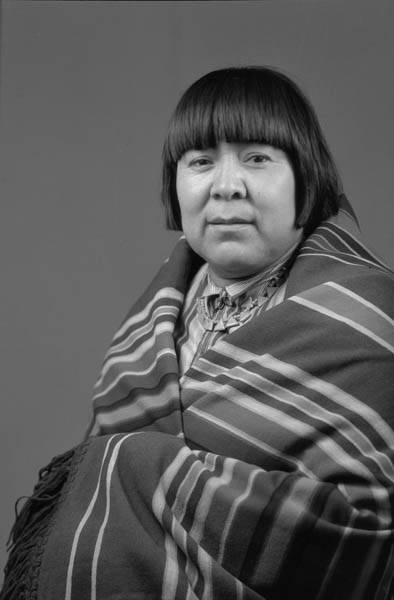
Tonita Peña

- Pop Chalee ("Blue Flower"), Taos Pueblo, born Merina Lujan, painter, muralist, performer
- Sharron Ahtone Harjo (born 1945), Kiowa painter from Oklahoma.
- Helen Hardin, Tsa-Sah-Wee-Eh ("Little Standing Spruce"), Santa Clara Pueblo, b. 1943 Abq NM. Painter/printmaker in the collections of the Heard Museum, Wheelwright Museum of the American Indian, Museum of New Mexico and others.
- Tonita Peña, Quah Ah, San Ildefonso Pueblo, born 1893 San Ildefonso, attended St. Catherine's Indian School. Painter and muralist.
- Pablita Velarde - Tse Tsan ("Golden Dawn"), Santa Clara Pueblo, born 1918 at Santa Clara Pueblo, New Mexico. Attended St. Catherine's Indian School. Painter, book illustrator, muralist.
- Jaune Quick-to-See Smith, Salish/Cree/Shoshone, born 1940 St. Ignatius, Montana. BA art education, Framingham State College, 1976. MA art, UNM, 1980. Work includes paintings and other art.
- Kay WalkingStick, Cherokee Nation. born 1935 Syracuse New York. BFA Beaver College (Pennsylvania) 1959; MFA Pratt Institute 1975. Painter.
- Emmi Whitehorse, Navajo. born 1956–1957, Crownpoint, New Mexico. BA painting UNM 1980. MA printmaking UM 1982. Painter.

== Performing arts ==
- Malinda M. Maynor, Lumbee, born Robeson County North Carolina (probably on reservation). A.B. History and Literature Harvard 1995; MA documentary film and video, Stanford 1997. Won film awards Best Indian-Produced Short Documentary 1997 Red Earth Film Festival and Best Short Documentary at South by Southwest Film Festival, 1997

== Photography ==
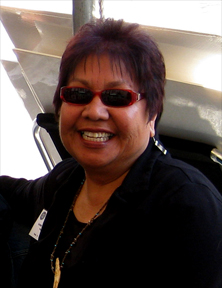
Linda Lomahaftewa in 2009

- Carmelita Little Turtle (Carm Little Turtle), Apache, Tarahumara, born 1952 Santa Maria, California, attended Navajo Community College, UNM, College of the Redwoods; photography Shenandoah Films in Arcata
- Linda Lomahaftewa, Hopi/Choctaw, born 1947 Phoenix; Assoc. Institute of American Indian Arts in Santa Fe, BFA and MFA San Francisco Art Institute 1970 and 1971. Photographer.
- Jolene Rickard, Tuscarora, born 1956 Niagara Falls New York. BFA Rochester Institute of Technology 1978. MA, PhD SUNY Buffalo 1996. Photographer.
- Sarah Sense, Chitimacha / Choctaw, born1980 Sacramento, California. BFA CSU Chico 2003, MFA Parsons the New School for Design, New York 2005. Former curator American Indian Community House Gallery 2005–07. Photoweavings.

== Printmaking ==
- Jean LaMarr, Pit River/Paiute, born 1945 Susanville, California, attended San Jose City College, UCB, U Oregon; art instructor at SF Art Institute and U Oregon. Printmaker.
- Melanie Yazzie, Navajo. born 1966, Ganado, Arizona. BA studio art ASU 1990. MFA printmaking UC Boulder 1993.

== Sculpture ==
- Lillian Pitt, Wa'-K-a-mu, Warm Springs Yakima Wasco, born 1943 Warm Springs, Oregon. AA, mental health and human services, Mt Hood Community College 1981. Maskmaker, bronze casting, raku ware
- Roxanne Swentzell, Santa Clara Pueblo, born 1992 Taos, New Mexico. Attended Institute of American Indian Arts and Portland Museum Art School. Ceramic sculpture.

== Textiles ==
- Mary Kawennatakie Adams (1917–1999), Mohawk First Nations textile artist and basket maker.
- Kay Curley Bennett (1922–1997), Navajo textile dollmaker, musician, and writer
- Julia Bah Joe (1875–1974)
- Jennie Thlunaut (1892–1986), Tlingit Chilkat weaver
- Gwen Westerman (Sisseton-Wahpeton Dakota Oyate/Cherokee Nation). Fluent in the Dakota language; Professor of English and Director of the Humanities Program at Minnesota State University, Mankato. Writer, poet, fiber artist.

== Woodworkers ==
- Kathleen Carlo-Kendall, Koyukon woodcarver
- Freda Diesing (1925–2002), Haida woodcarver

== See also ==
- Native American art
- List of Native American artists
- Timeline of Native American art history
- List of indigenous artists of the Americas
- List of Native American artists from Oklahoma
- Native Americans in the United States
- Native American women in the arts
- List of writers from peoples indigenous to the Americas
- Native American basketry
- Native American pottery

== Sources ==
- Farris, Phoebe (1999), "Native American women artists", Women Artists of Color, Greenwood Press, pp. 85-88, ISBN 0-313-30374-6
- Farris, Phoebe (April 2005), "Contemporary Native American Women Artists: Visual Expressions of Feminism, the Environment, and Identity", Feminist Studies, 31 (1): 95–109, doi:10.2307/20459008, hdl:2027/spo.0499697.0031.105, JSTOR 20459008
- Harlan, Theresa; Gully, Anne (1994), Watchful eyes: Native American women artists, Heard Museum, ISBN 9780934351478
- Jacobs, Margaret D. (2003), "Shaping a new way: White women and the movement to promote Pueblo Indian arts and crafts, 1900–1935", in Ressler, Susan R. (ed.), Women Artists of the American West, McFarland, pp. 83–96, ISBN 9780786410545
- Mithlo, Nancy Marie (2009), ""A Real Feminine Journey": Locating Indigenous Feminisms in the Arts", Meridians, 9 (2): 1–30, doi:10.2979/MER.2009.9.2.1, JSTOR 40338781, S2CID 144485507
- "Artist and scholar list", First American Art Magazine
- Yohe, Jill Ahlberg; Greeves, Teri (2019), Hearts of Our People: Native Women Artists, Minneapolis Institute of Art in association with the University of Washington Press, ISBN 9780295745794, LCCN 2018967294
