= Loloma =

Loloma is a surname. Notable people with the surname include:

- Charles Loloma (1921–1991), American Hopi artist known for his jewelry
- Otellie Loloma (1921–1993), American Hopi artist, specializing in pottery and dance
