= James Luna =

Indigenous performance artist from California (1950–2018)

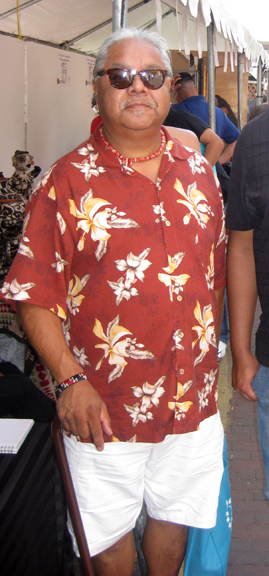
- James Luna in 2011
- Born: February 9, 1950; Orange, California, US
- Died: March 4, 2018 (aged 68); New Orleans, Louisiana
- Citizenship: La Jolla Band of Luiseño Indians and American
- Education: BFA University of California, MS San Diego State University, Honorary PhD Institute of American Indian Arts
- Known for: Performance, installation
- Notable work: The Artifact Piece (1987/1990), Take A Picture With A Real Indian (1993), Emendatio (2005)
- Movement: Indigenous performance art
- Awards: Eiteljorg Fellowship (2007), Guggenheim Fellowship (2017)

James Luna (February 9, 1950 – March 4, 2018) was a Puyukitchum, Ipai, and Mexican-American performance artist, photographer and multimedia installation artist. His work is best known for challenging the ways in which conventional museum exhibitions depict Native Americans. With recurring themes of multiculturalism, alcoholism, and colonialism, his work was often comedic and theatrical in nature. In 2017 he was awarded a Guggenheim Fellowship.

== Background ==
Luna was born in 1950 in Orange, California. He moved to the La Jolla Indian Reservation in California in 1975. In 1976, he earned a Bachelor of Fine Arts degree at the University of California, Irvine, and in 1983, he earned a Master of Science degree in counseling at San Diego State University. In 2011, he received an honorary doctoral degree from the Institute of American Indian Arts.

Luna was an active community member of the La Jolla Indian reservation. He served as the director of the tribe's education center in 1987, and the community was often a focal point of his photography and writing. He taught art at the University of California, San Diego and spent 25 years as a full-time academic counselor at Palomar College in San Marcos, California.

== Artwork ==
A self-proclaimed "American Indian Ceremonial Clown", "Culture Warrior," and "Tribal Citizen", Luna's artwork was known for challenging racial categories and exposing outmoded, Eurocentric ways in which museums have displayed Native American Indians as parts of natural history, rather than as living members of contemporary society.

While Luna began his art career as a painter, he soon branched out into performance and installation art, which he did for over three decades. He used objects, references to American popular culture, and his own body in his work. He performed over 58 solo exhibitions starting in 1981 and partook in group exhibitions and projects across the United States and the world. His artistry was often referred to as both disruptive and radical for its stark confrontations with colonialism, violence, sexuality, and identity. Some of his best known pieces are:

=== The Artifact Piece (1987–1990) ===
In The Artifact Piece (1987) at the San Diego Museum of Man, Luna lay naked except for a loincloth and still in a display case filled with sand and artifacts, such as Luna's favorite music and books, as well as legal papers and labels describing his scars. The work looked like a museum exhibit and was set in a hall dedicated to traditional ethnographic displays. The marks and scars on his body were acquired while drinking, fighting, or in accidents. Critics praised Luna's ability to challenge conventional understandings and displays of the Native American identities and presumptions about his own personhood by putting his own body on display. He performed "The Artifact Piece" in 1990 at The Decade Show in New York City.

=== Take a Picture With a Real Indian (1991–93) ===
In the early 1990s, Luna stood outside of Washington DC's Union Station and performed Take a Picture With a Real Indian. Luna describes the performance by saying:

Standing at a podium [sic] wearing an outfit, I announce: "Take a picture with a real Indian. Take a picture here, in Washington, D.C., on this beautiful Monday morning, on this holiday called Columbus Day. America loves to say 'her Indians.' America loves to see us dance for them. America likes our arts and crafts. America likes to name cars and trucks after our tribes. Take a picture with a real Indian. Take a picture here today, on this sunny day here in Washington, D.C." And then I just stand there. Eventually, one person will pose with me. After that they just start lining up. I'll do that for a while until I get mad enough or humiliated enough.

In utilizing and engaging a public audience, Luna taps into common cultural commodification of Native American culture. Such a trend manifests in the idea of the "McIndian"; the idea that Native culture is something that can be massed produced, consumed, and enjoyed without acknowledging the deep history of oppression Native Americans have endured.

=== In My Dreams: A Surreal, Post-Indian, Subterranean Blues Experience (1996) ===
In this performance, Luna is acclaimed for having challenged the trope that Native Americans are "peoples of memory" in ways that white culture may envy as being more purely spiritual. In one scene, he performs a "traditional" dance with crutches to reveal how white demand for Native performance is both limiting and inauthentic. In another, he puts his diabetes on display, giving himself insulin on stage which is said by critics to be emblematic of the binary of the "wild" but "controlled" Native American.

His final scene in this performance is a tribute to Dean Martin, which serves to reverse white tributes to Native peoples back on to his white audiences. By having a Native American Indian idolize a white person in a way that is relatively fanatic, Luna revealed the problematic manner in which white people can idolize Native American figures.

=== Emendatio (2005) ===
In 2005 the National Museum of the American Indian sponsored him to participate in the Venice Biennale. The piece he created, Emendatio, included three installations, Spinning Woman, Apparitions: Past and Present, and The Chapel for Pablo Tac, as well a personal performance in Venice, Renewal dedicated to Pablo Tac (1822–1841), a Luiseño Indian author and scholar, who went to study in Rome, where he died.

Utilizing cultural aspects of both the Luiseño people and his own family, Luna's installations and performance expose the affects that the poor translation of Native identities as well as globalization has had in oppressing narratives of Native American memory while inspiring both "white envy" and "liberal guilt".

== Honors and awards ==
Throughout his career, Luna received many awards. Including:

- 1988: LACE Fellowship (Los Angeles Contemporary Exhibitions, California)
- 1998: C.O.M.B.O Grant for Literary Studies (San Diego, California)
- 1991: Bessie Creator Award (New York Dance Theatre Workshop, New York)
- 1991: Fellowship in Sculpture (Western States Arts Federation's; Santa Fe, New Mexico)
- 1992: Grant for work in Performance, (California Arts Council; Sacramento, California)
- 1992: Offsite Installation Grant (Capp Street Project; San Francisco, California)
- 1992: Rockefeller Foundation Intercultural Film/Video Fellowship (New York)
- 1993: Best Live Short Subject Award for The History of the Luiseno People: La Jolla Reservation Christmas 1990 (American Indian Film Festival; San Francisco, California)
- 1994: Faculty Residency (Skowhegan School of Painting; Skowhegan, Maine)
- 1994: Distinguished Visiting Faculty Award (University of California, Davis)
- 1995: Native American Public Broadcasting Consortium Video Grant, "Bringing it All Back Home" video project
- 2000: Andrea Frank Foundation Grant
- 2000: Arts International Grant
- 2001: U.S.–Japan Creative Arts' Program Fellowship, Japan-U.S. Friendship Commission
- 2001: University of California Regents Lecture (University of California, San Diego)
- 2001: Dorantes Lecturer (Santa Barbara City College, California)
- 2002: Creative Capital Award
- 2007: Eiteljorg Fellowship for Native American Fine Art
- 2011: Honorary PhD from the Institute of American Indian Arts, in Santa Fe, New Mexico
- 2015: Native Arts and Cultures Foundation National Arts Fellowship
- 2017: Guggenheim Fellowship

== Quotes ==
"I truly live in two worlds. This 'two world' concept once posed too much ambiguity for me, as I felt torn as to whom I was. In maturity I have come to find it the source of my power, as I can easily move between these two places and not feel that I have to be one or the other, that I am an Indian in this modern society.

"Yes. The people are getting up there to have their picture taken with an Indian, just like they would have their picture taken with the bull statue on Wall Street. It's there for the taking. Indian people always have been fair game, and I don't think people quite understand that we're not game. Just because I'm an identifiable Indian, it doesn't mean I'm there for the taking.

But in the long run I'm making a statement for me, and through me, about people's interaction with American Indians, and the selective romanticization of us."

== Death ==
Luna had a fatal heart attack in New Orleans, Louisiana, on March 4, 2018, at the age of 68.

== See also ==
- List of Native American artists
- List of indigenous artists of the Americas
- Visual arts by indigenous peoples of the Americas
