= Jamie Okuma =

Native American fashion designer and visual artist

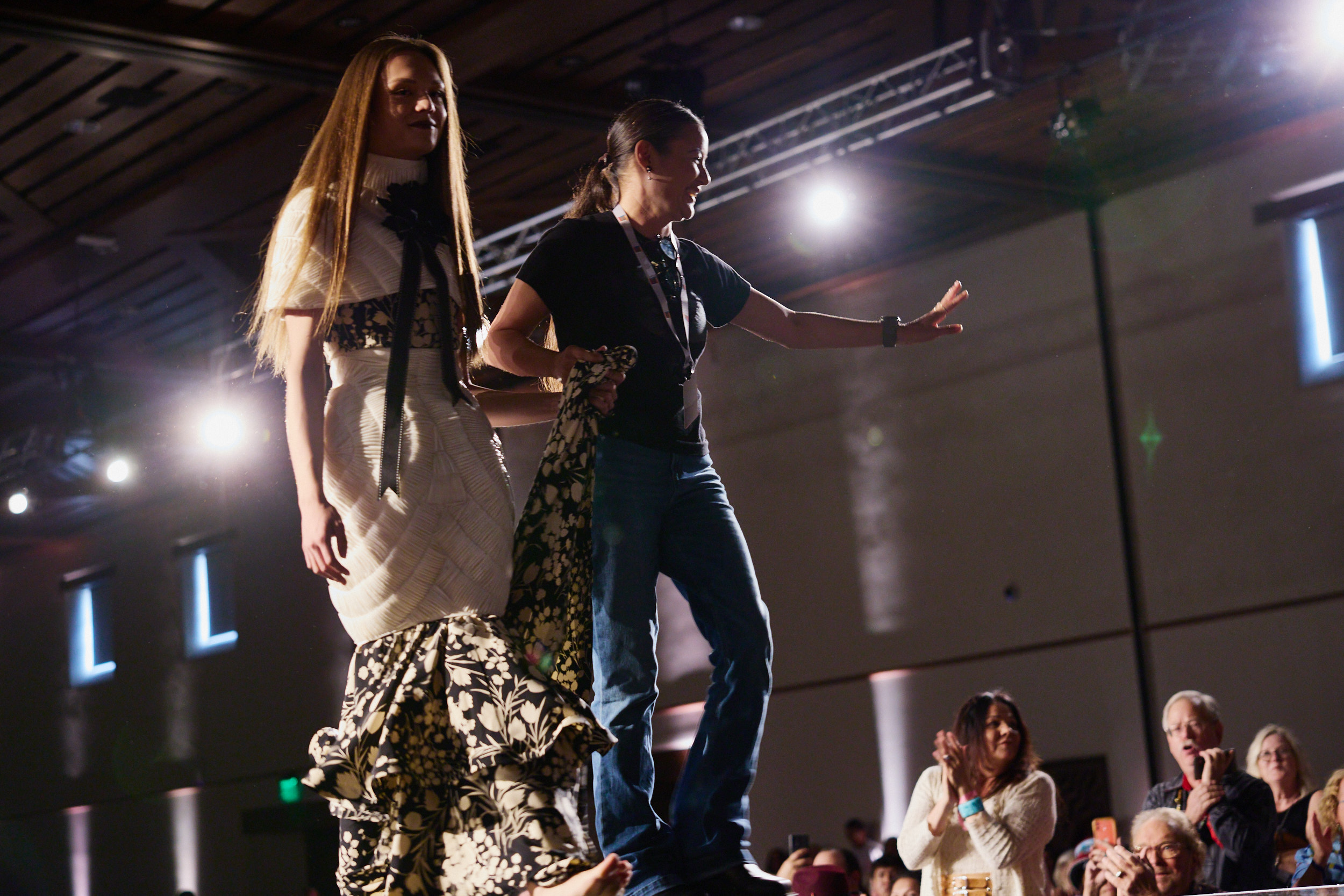
Jamie Okuma (right) at SWAIA Fashion Show 2025

Jamie Okuma (born 1977) is a Native American visual artist and fashion designer from California. She is known for beadwork, mixed-media soft sculpture, and fashion design. She is Luiseño, Wailaki, Okinawan, and Shoshone-Bannock. She is also an enrolled member of the La Jolla band of Indians in Southern California where she is currently living and working.

== Biography ==
Okuma was born in Glendale, California and lived the first years of her life in Los Angeles where her mother, painter and bead artist Sandra Okuma (Luiseño/Shoshone-Bannock), worked as a graphic designer for MCA Records. When Okuma was five, her family moved to the La Jolla Indian Reservation in Pauma Valley, California. At this time, Okuma began learning beadwork, encouraged by her mother. As a child and teenager, Okuma beaded her own dance regalia for powwows and earned money sewing regalia for others. She also accompanied her mother to Native American art shows.

After high school, she completed several graphic design classes at Palomar College in San Marcos, California, and went on to attend the Institute of American Indian Arts in Santa Fe, New Mexico.

== Artwork ==
Okuma's beaded dolls can include entire families or horses and riders, all with fully beaded regalia. The antique Venetian beads she uses can be as small as size 22°, about the size of a grain of salt.

She eventually moved from doll clothing design and creation to high-end fashion. "I had been doing dolls, intensive bead work [sic], and shows for 15 years and had reached my limit in those fields. I needed a change and fashion was something I had planned on doing initially before I had such success with my beadwork, so the combination of beadwork familiarity along with a need to be an aspiring fashionista brought me to where I am today with what I call contemporary native fashion."

== Career ==
Okuma has won seven Best in Show awards, four from the Heard Indian Market in Phoenix, Arizona, and three from the Santa Fe Indian Market in Santa Fe, New Mexico. She was also awarded a First Place distinction in the textiles category at the 2012 Heard Museum Indian Fair & Market. Her work has been shown in Germany, Australia, France, and numerous art institutions throughout the United States, including the Metropolitan Museum of Art in New York City. Her work is included in the permanent collections of the Minneapolis Institute of Art, the Metropolitan Museum of Art, the Nelson-Atkins Museum, and the Smithsonian Institution's National Museum of the American Indian. In 2020, her art was exhibited in the landmark exhibition Hearts of Our People: Native Women Artists at the Smithsonian American Art Museum. In 2023, Okuma was inducted into The Council of Fashion Designers of America (CFDA) and she is the first Native American designer to receive this honor.
