= Aguilar Family =

Native American family of potters

The Aguilar Family is a Native American family of potters from Santo Domingo Pueblo (currently known as Kewa Pueblo), New Mexico, United States. The group consisting of two sisters, Felipita Aguilar Garcia, Asuncion Aguilar Cate, and their sister in law, Mrs. Ramos Aguilar. Their pottery work together became known as Aguilar pottery, however they are sometimes referred to as the Aguilar Sisters.

== History ==
In the early 1900s, pottery creation at Santo Domingo Pueblo had experienced a significant decline. In 1910, Julius Seligman, who worked at the Bernalillo Mercantile Company near the pueblo, noticed the decline in the sales. At his suggestion, the two sisters, Felipita Aguilar Garcia, Asuncion Aguilar Cate, and their sister in law, Mrs. Ramos Aguilar attempted to revive the dying art. The three women worked together making pottery and their work became known as "Aguilar pottery."

The Aguilar sisters made traditional polychrome ollas, jars and dough bowls with several different styles of decoration. The painting style for which they are best known was a bold, geometric pattern with black paint on a cream colored slip or black and red on a cream slip, which almost totally obscured the cream background. This style was unique compared to the typical geometric forms of Santo Domingo pottery where areas were usually left open of unpainted. This style has become known as "negative boldface" or reverse-painted Aguilar pottery. They also made traditional Santo Domingo types of pottery painting including black-on-cream and black-on-red.

The Aguilar sisters' style of pottery ended around 1915, but is today making a comeback as the Aguilar polychrome style has been revived by one of Kewa pueblo's leading potters, Robert Tenorio.

Their pottery work, both as a family and as individual artists, can be found in various museum permanent collections including, the Brooklyn Museum, Nelson Atkins Museum of Art, Denver Art Museum, and others.

== See also ==
- List of Native American artists
