= Lena Frank Dick =

Washoe basket maker

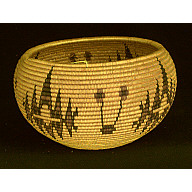
- Coiled basket by Lena Frank Dick
- Born: Lena Frank ca. 1889; Coleville, Antelope Valley, California, USA
- Died: 1965
- Years active: 1920s - 1935
- Known for: Washoe basket making
- Spouse: Levi Dick (m. 1906; died 1963)
- Parent(s): Charley and Lucy Frank

Lena Frank Dick (c. 1889 - 1965) was a Washoe basket maker best known for her tight weaves and figurative designs. Her baskets were primarily aesthetic as opposed to utilitarian.

== Biography ==
Lena Frank Dick was born in 1889 to Charlie and Lucy Frank. Her family belonged to the Antelope Valley Washoe people, who lived primarily in Nevada and California. She spent most of her life in Coleville, located in the Antelope Valley, Mono County, California.

As a teen, Lena married George Emm, with whom she had her only child, Juanita. However, Emm left following Juanita's birth. In 1906 Lena remarried Levi Dick, a construction worker. Lena and Levi remained married until his death in 1963. Lena withdrew from the public in the time following his death, and in 1965 she also died.

One of three daughters, Lena and her sisters were taught by their mother at a young age to weave. Over her lifetime, Lena was a prominent basket maker, served as a midwife, and performed Washoe puberty ceremonies for her community.

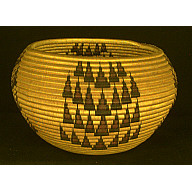
Lena Frank Dick Basket

== Washoe basket makers ==
Lena was known for her incredibly tight weaves during what is referred to as the "fancy basketry" period of Washoe art. For the Washoe tribe, basket weaving has served as a practical and artistic purpose for centuries. Because of the arid weather of the region of Nevada and California where they lived, the Washoe people had to remain mobile, and these woven baskets, known as degikup, were a lightweight and durable way to transport goods during these transitory periods. The baskets are built from young willow shoots, fern roots for black designs, and western redbud (Cercis occidentalis) for red designs. To create the basket requires an awl, knife, and a container of water to soak and soften the fibrous plant matter. Different designs were used to indicate stories, histories, or various messages.

Washoe delegates gifted baskets in diplomacy, such as the one presented to the Senate and House of Representatives in 1914. It depicted the events of early Nevada history, specifically when a Washoe tribe gave weapons to the white settlers of Nevada to aid in the War of 1865 (aka the American Civil War). It was a reminder of their willingness to aid when needed, but also a plea for help. Washoe people had been given barren land in the years before and were unable to use their traditional hunting grounds because they could not afford the cost of hunting licenses. In this case, baskets were being used as a potential political piece as well as proof of Washoe design and work.

In the late 19th century to early 20th century, European Americans recognized Native basketry as an art form and some art patrons supported Native women basket makers. During this period, Washoe basket makers invented the degikup, an almost spherical, fine coiled basket design.

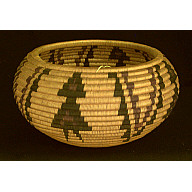
Tree Weave Basket by Lena Frank Dick

== Artistic career ==
Lena Dick's basketry initially imitated the style of Tootsie Dick Sam, the most influential weaver in the Antelope Valley in the early 1900s. However, over time Lena Dick's work became more individualized and her approach more energetic with an emphasis on triangular elements. Lena Dick also explored the colorful pictorial designs of Sarah Mayo's work, but rejected it after 1925 in favor of lightweight geometric patterns.

In the mid-1920s Lena Dick sold her baskets through a local Coleville grocery store. A local rancher, Fred Settelmeyer, noted the high quality of the baskets and informed Dr. Roscoe Day, a San Francisco orthodontist and collector. Settelmeyer purchased basketry of high quality for Day, and Lena Dick responded by refining her technique and design. Afterward, Lena and her sister Lillie worked under the exclusive commission of Roscoe A. Day. She produced 13 baskets for Roscoe, which, after his death, were sold to the State of California.

Lena Dick's works were often only four or five inches tall, with wide openings. Lena was known for her tight and precise stitching, which was as small as 25 to 33 stitches per inch. Compared to other well known basket weaving artists, Lena's career was short. By 1935 she had stopped making these extremely small designs as her eyesight made it too difficult to complete. She still continued to make baskets, though they were more utilitarian than her previous works.

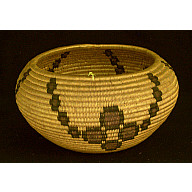
Lena Frank Dick Circular Basket

== Contemporaries ==
Lena Frank Dick is attributed to 28 pieces during her short career, but only in the late 1970s was she credited for much of her work. Before that, Lena's work was often confused with that of Datsolalee, Louisa Keyser (1850–1925). Datsolalee's art differed from Lena's in a few key ways. First, her baskets were taller, usually about 14 inches. She also had small bases, wide centers, and narrow openings. However, both women used red and black colors that were traditional to the Washoe people.

The works that Lena created for Roscoe and sold to the State of California were all placed under Datsolalee's name. Lena saw this for herself when visiting the Nevada State Museum with her granddaughter, where she pointed out some of her works among those attributed to Datsolalee. Datsolalee was also an influential basket weaver and is often credited with being the first to create purely aesthetic baskets. Datsolalee had patrons who funded her work and allowed her to focus all of her efforts on creating her baskets in a career that spanned more than 30 years.

== See also ==
- List of Native American artists
