= Fritz Scholder =

American painter (1937–2005)

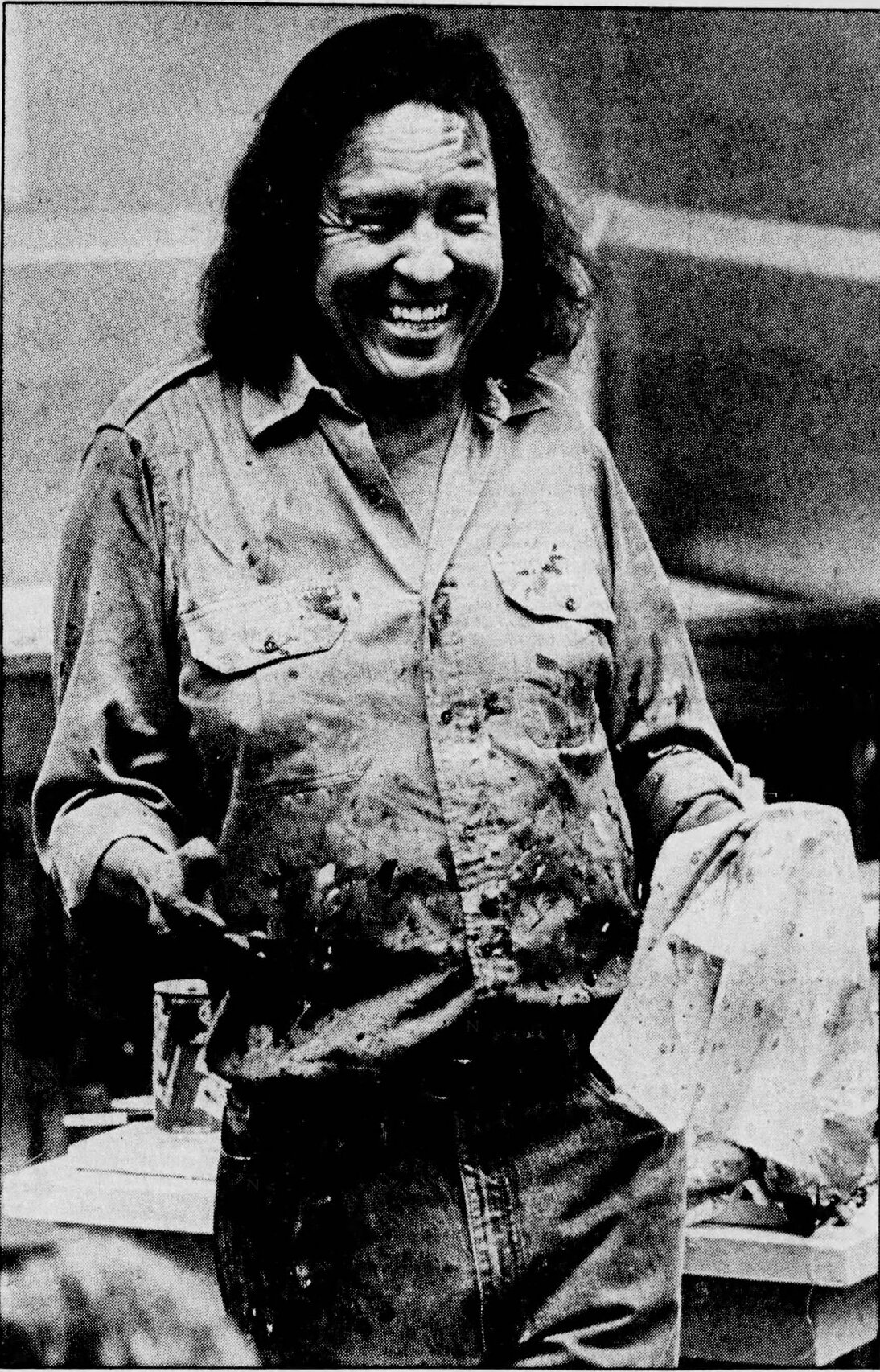
- Scholder in 1986
- Born: October 6, 1937; Breckenridge, Minnesota, U.S.
- Died: February 10, 2005 (aged 67); Scottsdale, Arizona, U.S.
- Citizenship: La Jolla Band of Luiseño Indians, American
- Education: MFA: University of Arizona (1964)
- Known for: painting, printmaking
- Movement: Abstract Expressionism
- Website: fritzscholder.com

Fritz William Scholder V (October 6, 1937 – February 10, 2005) was a Native American artist, who produced paintings, monotypes, lithographs, and sculptures. Scholder was an enrolled member of the La Jolla Band of Luiseño Indians, a federally recognized tribe of Luiseños, a California Mission tribe. Scholder's most influential works were post-modern in sensibility and somewhat Pop Art in execution as he sought to deconstruct the mythos of the American Indian. A teacher at the Institute of American Indian Arts (IAIA) in Santa Fe in the late 1960s, Scholder instructed prominent Native American students.

== Early life and education ==
Fritz Scholder was born October 6, 1937, in Breckenridge, Minnesota. As a high school student at Pierre, South Dakota, his art teacher was Oscar Howe, a noted Yanktonai Dakota artist. In the summer of 1955, Scholder attended the Mid-West Art and Music Camp at the University of Kansas. He studied with Robert B. Green at Lawrence, Kansas.

In 1956, Scholder graduated from Ashland High School in Wisconsin and took his freshman year at Wisconsin State University in Superior, where he studied with Arthur Kruk, James Grittner, and Michael Gorski.

== Early career ==
In 1957, Scholder moved with his family to Sacramento, California, where he studied with Wayne Thiebaud. Thiebaud invited Scholder to join him, along with Greg Kondos and Peter Vandenberg in creating a cooperative gallery in Sacramento. Scholder's first show received an exceptional review. Scholder's next one-man exhibition was at the Crocker Art Museum in Sacramento. His work was being shown throughout the region, including the California Palace of the Legion of Honor in San Francisco. Upon graduation from Sacramento State University, where he studied with Tarmo Pasto and Raymond Witt, Scholder was invited to participate in the Rockefeller Indian Art Project at the University of Arizona in 1961.

== Native Americans series ==
The American Indian, Fritz Scholder, oil on linen, 1970. Indian Arts and Crafts Board Collection, Department of the Interior, NMAI

He met Cherokee Nation fashion designer Lloyd Kiva New and studied with Hopi jeweler Charles Loloma. After receiving a John Hay Whitney Fellowship, Scholder moved to Tucson and became a graduate assistant in the University of Arizona fine arts department where he studied with Andrew Rush and Charles Littler. There, he met artists Max Cole, John Heric and Bruce McGrew. After graduating with a MFA degree in 1964, Scholder accepted the position of instructor in advanced painting and contemporary art history at the newly formed Institute of American Indian Arts in Santa Fe, New Mexico.

Scholder always worked in series of paintings. In 1967, his new series on the Native American, depicting the "real Indian," became an immediate controversy. Scholder painted Indians with American flags, beer cans, and cats. His target was the loaded national cliché and guilt of the dominant culture. His portraits have been described as drawing out "the psychic cost of the gap between romantic and backward-looking popular stereotypes of Indians and the actualities of their daily lives" and as often employing "a sardonic humour in their revelations of the absurdities of Native people's lives in the twentieth-century world". Scholder did not grow up as an Indian and his unique perspective could not be denied. Scholder resigned from IAIA in 1969 and traveled to Europe and North Africa. He returned to Santa Fe and acquired a small adobe house and studio on Canyon Road.

In 1970 he was invited by the Tamarind Institute, a print studio which had relocated that year from Los Angeles to Albuquerque, to do their first major project in their new premises. The collaboration resulted in the suite of seven lithographs Indians Forever, where the artist articulates more consciously the image of the modern Indian and which introduced him to the medium of lithography. The success of the series with critics and the public alike also helped to establish Tamarind Institute as a leading centre for printmaking in the United States. Scholder/Indians was published by Northland Press, the first book on Scholder's work. In the same year, Scholder had his first one-man show at the Lee Nordness Galleries.

Indian Image (1972) at the Smithsonian American Art Museum in 2023

He had become a major influence for a generation of Native American artists. He was invited to lecture at numerous art conferences and universities including Princeton and Dartmouth. In 1972 an exhibition of the Dartmouth Portraits opened at Cordier and Ekstrom in New York to favorable reviews. In the same year, Adelyn D. Breeskin of the Smithsonian American Art Museum visited Scholder and suggested a two-person show of the work of Scholder and one of his former students. Scholder chose T. C. Cannon. The show opened in Washington, D.C. to good reviews and traveled to Romania, Yugoslavia, Berlin, and London. Scholder was invited to have a one-man show at the Basil V International Art Fair in Switzerland in 1974. After Basel, Scholder traveled to Egypt and painted the sphinx and pyramids.

In 1975, Scholder did his first etchings at El Dorado Press in Berkeley, California. Scholder's work was explored in a series on American Indian artists for the Public Broadcasting System (PBS). Other artists in the series included R. C. Gorman, Helen Hardin, Allan Houser, Charles Loloma, and Joseph Lonewolf. Also in 1975, a book of his lithographs was released by New York Graphic Society. Scholder discovered monotypes in 1977. His first exhibition of photographs was shown at the Heard Museum in 1978, documented by Indian Kitsch, a book published by Northland Press. A miniature book of Scholder's poetry was produced by Stinehour Press in 1979. In 1980, Scholder was guest artist at the Oklahoma Art Institute, which resulted in a PBS film documentary, American Portrait. Scholder drew lithographs at Ediciones Poligrafa in Barcelona and was guest artist at ISOMATA, USC at Idyllwild, California and again at the Oklahoma Arts Institute.

== Recognition in the 1980s ==
In 1981, the Tucson Museum of Art hosted a retrospective of Scholder's work in which the artist was asked to select the works exhibited. In 1982, Scholder acquired a loft in Manhattan. A major monograph was published by Rizzoli International, and Scholder returned to Egypt at the invitation of famed archeologist Kent Weeks. In 1983, Scholder received a New Mexico Governor's Award for Excellence in the Arts. Scholder was named lifetime Societaire of the Salon d'Automne and exhibited at the Grand Palais in Paris in 1984. The following year, he was honored with the Golden Plate Award from the American Academy of Achievement. In 1991, Afternoon Nap was published, the first in a series of book projects by Nazraeli Press in Munich. Scholder received five honorary degrees from Ripon College, the University of Arizona, Concordia College, the College of Santa Fe and the first honorary degree from the University of Wisconsin–Superior. A humanitarian award from the 14th Norsk Hostfest followed.

== Later exhibitions ==
Future Clone, Fritz Scholder, bronze sculpture, 1999, George Gustav Heye Center, NMAI

In 1994, Leonard Baskin invited Scholder to collaborate on a major book at Gehenna Press in Massachusetts. Scholder returned to Arizona and established his private press, with Linda Tay'nahza', Apocrypha. He then retreated to the MacDowell Colony in New Hampshire. The following year, two major shows opened, The Private Work of Fritz Scholder at the Phoenix Art Museum and a year-long exhibition, Fritz Scholder/Icons and Apparitions, at the Scottsdale Center for the Arts in Arizona. Scholder began the Millenium series and worked in London, Paris and Budapest.

In 1999 Scholder completed Future Clone, an eight-foot-tall bronze sculpture, described by ArtDaily as "androgynous angel figure" which exhibits "the same agitated, textural touch" that Scholder brought to his paintings. He produced his first digital book, Thoughts at Night, in 2000. That year Scholder returned to Santa Fe to open an exhibition Alone/Not Alone at Chiaroscuro Gallery. In October, 2001 a major exhibition of paintings and sculpture regarding death and skulls titled, Last Portraits, at the Tweed Museum of Art, University of Minnesota, opened in Duluth. In March 2002, Chiaroscuro Galleries in Scottsdale opened a major show titled Orchids and Other Flowers, Scholder's reaction to 9/11. Scholder is the 2002 Arizona Governor's Award recipient.

== Posthumous recognition ==
On August 25, 2009, Governor Arnold Schwarzenegger and Maria Shriver announced that Scholder was one of 13 California Hall of Fame inductees. His work was then featured at The California Museum's exhibition of the work and contributions of that year's Hall of Fame laureates. The induction ceremony was on December 1, 2009, at the museum in Sacramento.

Scholder's Future Clone sculpture was included in a scene in Darren Aronofsky's 2010 film Black Swan, in which it has been described as "chilling like a Baselitz painting, all devoured face and wings, an evil spectre". On November 1, 2008, the National Museum of the American Indian opened a two-venue retrospective of Scholder's work titled Indian/Not Indian: one in Washington, DC and the other in New York. On October 4, 2015, the Denver Art Museum opened a major traveling exhibition of Scholder's "Indian" series titled, Super Indian: Fritz Scholder, 1967–1980. "Super Indian" then traveled to the Phoenix Art Museum and the Nerman Museum of Contemporary Art in Overland Park, Kansas.

Scholder's work was part of Art for a New Understanding: Native Voices, 1950s to Now (2019–20), a traveling exhibition organized by Crystal Bridges Museum of American Art, and of Stretching the Canvas: Eight Decades of Native Painting (2019–21), a survey at the National Museum of the American Indian George Gustav Heye Center in New York.

In June 2022, Scholder's triptych "Possession on the Beach," previously shown during "Indian/Not Indian" exhibition (2008–09) at the Smithsonian's National Museum of the American Indian, is exhibited in the American Wing at The Metropolitan Museum of Art in New York City.
