= Arthur and Hilda Coriz =

Native American potters

Arthur and Hilda Coriz were Native American husband and wife potters from Santo Domingo Pueblo (now called Kewa Pueblo), New Mexico, United States. They signed their pottery as "Arthur and Hilda Coriz."

== Early history ==
Hilda Coriz (née Hilda Tenorio; 1949–2007) was a sister of award-winning potter Robert Tenorio, and began making pottery with the encouragement of her brother.

Arthur Coriz (1948–1998) started to learn about pottery in 1975, after watching his wife Hilda and her brother Robert.

== Career ==
When they first started, Arthur and Hilda would make pots while Robert would create decorative designs and do the painting. Within two years time, Arthur was painting pots for himself and his wife Hilda. They eventually became full-time potters, winning numerous awards at the Santa Fe Indian Markets between 1983-1998. They participated in exhibitions at the Santa Fe Indian Market and the Eight Northern Indian Pueblos Arts & Crafts Shows.

The Coriz' couple made pottery using the traditional methods of Santo Domingo potters. They used only natural clays and the Rocky Mountain bee plant, also known as wild spinach, and honey for making the black paint. Together they made traditional polychrome jars, bowls, dough bowls, and canteens. Arthur and Hilda’s favorite designs included birds, clouds, flowers and animals like the deer and bighorn sheep. They signed their pottery as "Arthur and Hilda Coriz."

== Death and legacy ==
Arthur died in 1998 and Hilda died in 2007. Their daughter Ione Coriz (born 1973) also makes traditional Santo Domingo pottery. In 1988, Ione Coriz placed 3rd and in 1989 she won 2nd for her pottery in the ages 18 and under divisions at the Santa Fe Indian Market.

== See also ==
- List of Native American artists

== References and further reading ==
- Peaster, Lillian - Pueblo Pottery Families. 2nd Edition. 2003.
- Schaaf, Gregory - Southern Pueblo Pottery: 2,000 Artist Biographies. 2002.
- Trimble, Stephen - Talking with the Clay: The Art of Pueblo Pottery. 1987.
