= Amos Bad Heart Bull =

Oglala Lakota artist

Amos Bad Heart Bull, also known as Waŋblí Wapȟáha (Eagle Bonnet; c. 1868–1913), was a noted Oglala Lakota artist in what is called Ledger Art. It is a style that adapts traditional Native American pictography to the new European medium of paper, and named for the accountants' ledger books, available from traders, used by the artists for their drawings and paintings. He was also the tribal historian of the Oglala, as his father Bad Heart Bull (Tȟatȟáŋka Čhaŋtéšiča) was before him.

== Early years ==
Born about 1868 or 1869, Amos was the son of Bad Heart Bull (Tȟatȟáŋka Čhaŋtéšiča) and his wife Her Red Blanket (Tȟašína Lúta Wiŋ). Amos' father was a brother of the headman He Dog and a nephew of the famous Oglala chief Red Cloud. Known as Eagle Bonnet (Waŋblí Wapȟáha) as a young man, Amos grew up living the traditional life of the Oglala Lakota. His family belonged to an Oglala camp known as the Soreback Band. He was eight years old when George Armstrong Custer's column attacked the large Indian village in the Battle of the Little Bighorn in 1875. The Sioux decisively defeated Custer's forces.

At the end of the Great Sioux War of 1876-77, the Bad Heart Bull family surrendered at the Red Cloud Agency on April 18, 1877, several weeks before Crazy Horse. Following the killing of Crazy Horse in September 1877, the family moved with other northern Oglala to the nearby Spotted Tail Agency. The family fled north with other Oglala, eventually joining Sitting Bull in Canada. After a few years, the Bad Heart Bull family probably returned to the U.S. with other Oglala Lakota, who surrendered at Fort Keogh in 1880.

They were transferred to the Standing Rock Sioux Reservation in 1881. The following spring, they were sent to join the rest of the Oglala at the Pine Ridge Indian Reservation in present-day South Dakota.

== Becoming an artist ==
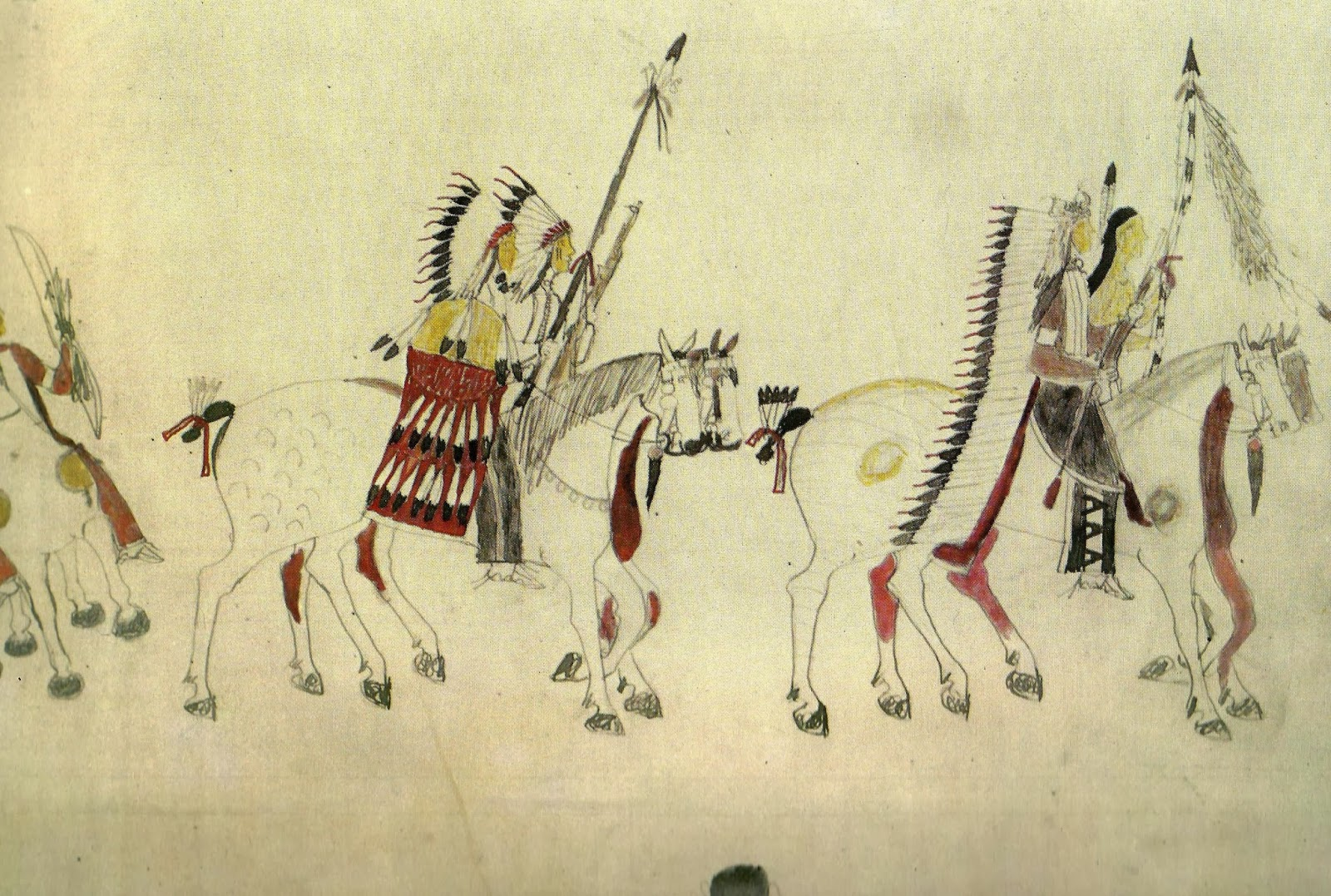
Warriors on horseback (Colored drawing by Amos Bad Heart Bull)

As a young man, Amos Bad Heart Bull showed interest in the history of the Oglala, and began to draw pictures depicting traditional lifeways and events. The people have a tradition of drawing pictographs to show history, generally drawn and painted on animal skins. This is known as the winter count. Amos' father was the tribal historian and used such a technique.

In 1890, Amos Bad Heart Bull enlisted in the U.S. Army as an Indian scout and learned to speak English. He served at Fort Robinson with his uncle Grant Short Bull. During this time, he purchased a ledger book from a clothing dealer in nearby Crawford, Nebraska. He used its papers for drawing a series of pictures, depicting Sioux ceremonials, battles, and everyday life. In the process, he adapted traditional Native American pictography techniques to the new European medium of paper.

This was part of a development called Ledger Art, named for the accountants' ledger books used by Native Americans for their drawings and paintings. It was particularly associated with the art produced in the late nineteenth century by Native American men held at Fort Marion in Florida. They were held for more than a decade as prisoners of war, or political prisoners, following the Plains Wars. In addition to classes in English and other topics of United States society, the fort's officials provided the men with drawing materials and ledger books for their work. The collection of ledger books is held by the Smithsonian Institution.

After returning to Pine Ridge after serving his enlistment, Bad Heart Bull made his living as a small cattleman. He became the tribal historian of the Oglala Lakota, as his father had been before him. After the allocation of communal lands of the Pine Ridge Reservation under the Dawes Act, Bad Heart Bull received his land allotment along Black Tail Creek northwest of Oglala, South Dakota, near other members of the Soreback Band.

== Marriage and family ==
He married a widow named Sophia after returning to Pine Ridge Reservation. Their only daughter, Victoria, was born in 1909 but died four months later. His wife died in 1910 and Amos died on August 3, 1913.

== Bad Heart Bull papers ==
At the time of his death, Amos' sketchbook was given to his younger sister, Dolly Pretty Cloud. In the 1930s, she was contacted by Helen Blish, a graduate student from the University of Nebraska, who asked to study her brother's work for her master's thesis in art. When Pretty Cloud died in 1947, her brother's ledger book full of drawings was buried with her.

In the 1930s, Hartley Burr Alexander, Blish's professor, had Bad Heart Bull's drawings photographed as a record and to accompany Blish's theses. He published them with an introduction and notes in a book, Sioux Indian Painting (1938). With the rise of interest in Native American history and culture, in 1967, the University of Nebraska Press published Blish's thesis as A Pictographic History of the Oglala Sioux. It included the drawings of Amos Bad Heart Bull. The reproductions were based on copies of the original prints of the photographs of the drawings.

Through Alexander's admiration of Bad Heart Bull's work, and Alexander's position as thematic consultant for the construction of the Nebraska State Capitol, Bad Heart Bull is noted as a primary thematic design influence on the Nebraska State Capitol, particularly in its East Chamber (its original Senate chamber).

== Translation of his name ==
A literal translation of the Lakota word čhaŋtéšiče is "he has a bad heart", but an idiomatic meaning is "he is sad." Tȟatȟáŋka Čhaŋtéšiče would likely have been understood in the same way "Sad Bull" would be in English. When Lakota names are translated literally into English, they may lose their idiomatic sense.

== See also ==
- List of Native American artists
- Plains hide painting
- Winter count, traditional Plains calendars
