= Avelino Arquero =

Pueblo-American painter

- Education: Santa Fe Indian School
- Occupation: painter

Avelino Arquero is a Pueblo-American painter from the Cochití Pueblo. He studied at the Santa Fe Indian School in the 1930s and has exhibited his work across the country. He is known for his work with tempera painting.
