= Sheila Kanieson Ransom =

American artist

- Born: 1954 (age 71–72); Five Nations (Iroquois Confederacy), New York
- Known for: basketry

Sheila Kanieson Ransom (born 1954, Five Nations Haudenosaunee, New York) is an American artist known for her sweetgrass and black ash basket making. Her weaving represents her efforts in preserving Akwesasne culture. Her work is in the New York State Museum and the Hood Museum of Art. Her work, Pope Basket, was acquired by the Smithsonian American Art Museum as part of the Renwick Gallery's 50th Anniversary Campaign in 2022. In 2012, Ransom gifted a version of Pope Basket to Pope Benedict XVI after the canonization of Kateri Tekakwitha.
