= Tirador Armstrong =

Native American painter (1935–2010)

- Born: Porferio Tirador Armstrong; May 8, 1935; Clinton, Oklahoma
- Died: March 17, 2010 (aged 74)
- Citizenship: Cheyenne and Arapaho Tribes, American
- Education: Concho Indian Boarding School
- Occupation: painter
- Spouse: Dola Jean Tartsah

Porferio Tirador "Gopher" Armstrong (May 8, 1935 – March 17, 2010), sometimes called Theodore Armstrong, was a Cheyenne painter of Caddo descent from Clinton, Oklahoma. Armstrong had a keen interest in art since elementary school. He studied at the Concho Indian Boarding School and has exhibited his work across the country. Some of his works are in the permanent collection of institutions including the Oklahoma Historical Society Museum and the Joslyn Art Museum.

Armstrong served in the United States Marine Corps for three years during WWII. He married Dola Jean Tartsah (from the Kiowa tribe) in 1961. He died on March 17, 2010, and is buried in the Concho Cemetery, Concho, Oklahoma.
