= Annie Antone =

Tohomo O'Odham basket weaver

- Born: 1955 (age 70–71); Tucson, Arizona, United States
- Education: Family
- Known for: Basket weaving

Annie Antone (born 1955) is a Native American Tohono O'odham basket weaver from Gila Bend, Arizona.

== Background ==
Annie Antone was born in Tucson, Arizona, in 1955. She learned how to weave baskets from her mother, Irene Antone. Annie began at the age of 19 and sold her first basket for $10. She gave the money to her mother. Currently she lives on the Gila Bend Reservation.

== Basketry ==
Antone only uses plant materials harvested from her homeland, the Sonoran Desert. These include yucca, devil's claw, and bear grass. Her techniques in making coiled baskets are traditional, but her designs are completely unique. She specializes in highly graphic, pictorial imagery and has featured realistic images of panthers and semi-tractor trailers. She wove a basket featuring the traditional flute player, surrounded by musical notes forming a specific song. This piece is on display in the Native American art collection of the Casino Arizona. The curator there, Aleta Rinlero says of Antone's work: "She doesn't weave baskets, she weaves concepts."

Ancient Hohokam pottery designs also provide Antone with inspiration for basket designs, as have the flora and fauna of the Sonoran Desert. To achieve her complex designs, she carefully sketches them out before weaving.

She has exhibited throughout the country, as well as the British Museum, and won awards at the Heard Museum Guild Indian Fair and Market, Red Earth, Gallup Ceremonial, the O'odham Tash Rodeo and Fair, and the Santa Fe Indian Market. She was first invited to exhibit and demonstrate basketry at the National Museum of Natural History, Smithsonian Institution in Washington, D.C. in 1992 and has been invited back by the National Museum of the American Indian many times.

== See also ==
- List of Native American artists
- Visual arts by indigenous peoples of the Americas
