= Linda Aguilar =

Chumash basket maker

Linda Aguilar is a Chumash artist who was born in 1946 in Santa Barbara, California. Linda is known for her horsehair baskets which are "decorated with shells, beads, and other found materials such as vintage bingo tiles, miniature dice, playing cards, abalone buttons, and clam shell disks." She was inspired to make horsehair baskets when she visited a museum in Pasadena, California. She uses "non-traditional" materials in her baskets while still approaches basket making with tradition. She has shown her work at the Smithsonian, the Denver Art Museum, Southwest Museum in Los Angeles, The Stagecoach Museum at Newbury Park, CA, and California Academy of Science. Aguilar was on the California Indian Basketweavers Association founding board.

== Education ==
She went to college at the University of California, Santa Barbara with the plan to become a painter and graduated with a degree in studio art.

== Awards and Fellowships ==
Aguilar was the 2011 Eric and Barbara Dobkin Native Artist Fellow at the School for Advanced Research. She was also the Native Arts Artist-in Residence and set up her studio at the Denver Art Museum from November 2013 to January 2014.

== Collections ==
Aguilar's work is held in the permanent collection of the Smithsonian Museum of American Art, the Autry Museum, and the School for Advanced Research.
