= Tyrrell Tapaha =

Diné (Navajo) textile artist

- Born: 2001 (age 24–25); Goat Springs, Arizona
- Known for: Diné textile art and traditional weaving
- Style: hand spun wool pictorial weavings
- Awards: Brandford/Elliott Award from the American Textile Society

Tyrrell Tapaha (born 2001) is a Diné textile artist who makes pictorial woven works. Tapaha is a sixth generation weaver who grew up on the Navajo Nation at Goat Springs, Arizona. In 2022 they received the Brandford/Elliott Award from the American Textile Society.

== Early life ==
Tapaha grew up on the Navajo Nation in the Four Corners region of northeastern Arizona near T'iis Názbạs (Teec Nos Pos), where they learned traditional weaving from their family, helping to herd sheep and spin yarn. It was through their great-grandmother, Mary Kady Clah and other family members, that Tapaha learned the art and craft of weaving. Tapaha has stated that they use "archaic tools to make contemporary stories. Tapaha began weaving at the age of seven.

== Work ==
Tapaha's work explores "the complexity of lived experience, imagined futures and the rich history of their community." Using a vertical, traditional Navajo-type loom with a batten and weaving comb, they produce woven textiles and fiber art using hand spun vegetal matter dyed Navajo-Churro fleece, alpaca (Navajo-raised as well as New Zealand-raised), mohair, and merino wools in a style that combines contemporary with traditional imagery. Tapaha gathers desert plants from Arizona and Utah to make the dyes used in the weavings. They also use contemporary alternative fibrous materials, for example, recycled plastic yarn. Tapaha has described the work as collage-like "visual abstraction" in which woven pieces are broken apart and then rewoven "back together in some type of amorphous figure." They have also developed, with Ira Vandever, a blended fiber from hemp combined with Churro wool, and often combines several types of fiber in a single work. In addition to the pictorial textiles he weaves, he is also a printmaker and creates felted objects that are both utilitarian and aesthetic. One of Tapaha's passions are the Diné teachings and kinship system of K'e. Tapaha has stated:

Every aspect of Diné weaving has teachings sowed from past generations that encourage learning generations to think critically about resource use, hard work, reverence, and persistence.

Tapaha's work has been exhibited at the Museum of Indian Arts and Culture in Santa Fe, the Museum of Contemporary Arts Flagstaff, among other venues. Their work has been featured in the Baltimore Sun, the Navajo Times and Hyperalleric, Native American Art Magazine among other publications. They are one of four Diné artists featured in the film Weaving the Future directed by Shaun Price. Nicholas Geib has made a short documentary film on Tapaha and their work.

The content of the work investigates and challenges colonialist frameworks regarding Navajo weaving, for example in the piece, Áshkii Gáamalii : The Boy Who Lives in Two Worlds, that includes the embroidered text, KKKolonization Killz, as an affront towards and resistance to the "sustained violence that the settler state has forced upon Indigenous peoples, and not just in governmental policies". The work also sheds light on the inequities of the often-idealized trading post system, where Indigenous weavers were not paid a living wage for their work.

In addition to their "from sheep-to-loom" artistic practice, Tapaha is a full-time sheep herder on the Navajo Nation in the Four Corners area. Tapaha describes this holistic approach as fueled by an interest in "the ecology, the hydrology and just the generalized land management that comes with [this] process.” They go on to state:

I think it’s powerful to know that the thing that not only sustains me financially, emotionally and spiritually is the thing that also sustains the land in the same way, it sustains the sheep in the same way, and that is really powerful.

In 2024, Tapaha had a solo show at The Valley gallery in Taos, New Mexico. The exhibition included weavings, sculpture and photographs made at the Tapaha family' sheep camp. In 2025, Tapaha's work was shown at the Zimmerli Museum.

== Awards and collections ==
In 2022 they received the Brandford/Elliott Award from the American Textile Society.

Tapaha's work is included in the Tia Collection the collection of the Museum of Indian Arts and Culture, and Crystal Bridges Museum of American Art.

== Personal life ==
Tapaha is queer and uses he/they pronouns.

== See also ==
• Eric-Paul Riege
