= Beatien Yazz =

Native American painter (1928–2022)

Jimmy Toddy
- Beatien Yazz
- Born: Hoska Ye Ta Das Woot; May 29, 1929 near Wide Ruins, Arizona, U.S.
- Died: June 20, 2021 (aged 92)
- Citizenship: Navajo Nation and American
- Education: Santa Fe Indian School
- Style: Flatstyle
- Movement: Studio school

Beatien Yazz (May 29, 1929 – June 20, 2021), also called Jimmy Toddy, was a Navajo American painter and teacher born near Wide Ruins, Arizona. He exhibited his work around the world and is known for his paintings of animals and people and for his children's book illustrations.

== Early life ==
Hoska Ye Ta Das Woot was born to Joe and Desbah Toddy on the Navajo Reservation near Wide Ruins, Arizona. He often went by his English-language name Jimmy Toddy, as well as by variations of Bea Etin Yazz ("Little No Shirt" in Navajo). As a young child, he colored with crayons and enjoyed making art. Bill and Sallie Lippencott, who ran the Wide Ruins Trading Post, recognized his talent and encouraged his art. He exhibited for the first time at age 10, with his work shown at a museum in Springfield, Illinois.

Yazz attended the Wide Ruins Day School, followed by two years at the Santa Fe Indian School. Then he studied for three years at Fort Wingate Indian School and one year at the Sherman Indian High School.

During World War II, Yazz lied about his age in order to serve in the United States Marine Corps as a Code talker, utilizing his knowledge of the Navajo language.

When he returned to the reservation after the war, he dedicated himself to art. In the late 1940s he received a scholarship to study under painter Yasuo Kuniyoshi as part of a summer program at Mills College. During this program, he was able to paint with oil paint from a live model.

== Art career ==
Though Yazz worked for a time as a police officer in Fort Defiance, Arizona and as an art teacher at Stewart Indian School in Carson City, Nevada, he dedicated most of his adult life to creating art full time.

Yazz painted subjects familiar to him in colorful Flatstyle with minimal backgrounds. He often used casein paint for his works. His paintings "record the natural movement of light and air with powerful drama."

Yazz earned acclaim with collectors by the 1950s. Alberta Hannum wrote two popular books about his life, including illustrations by Yazz. Spin a Silver Dollar: The Story of a Desert Trading-post (Viking Press, 1945) (original title as published in 1945: Spin a Silver Coin)told of his early life meeting the Lippencotts, and its sequel Paint the Wind (1958) continued Yazz's story as a young adult. Spin a Silver Dollar was condensed by Reader's Digest and was presented on Cavalcade of America.

In addition to exhibiting and selling paintings, Yazz also created works on commission. He created some tiles for Gila Pottery, designed fabric on commission for Tumble-weed Prints, and had his work reproduced as greeting cards for a number of companies. Probably his most famous painting was an untitled one that art director Gary Burden found at a yard sale for 25 cents and later used for the front sleeve of The Eagles' 1974 album On The Border.

By the 1970s, Yazz had developed severe eye problems and deteriorating eyesight. A Navajo Medicine man told him this was punishment for painting sacred Navajo figures. Without treatment, his eyes never improved, and Yazz was not able to paint past 1991.

In early 1983, Yazz worked with Sallie Wagner (formerly Sallie Lippencott) and J.J. Brody to publish Yazz: Navajo Painter, which told his life story and included a number of illustrations.

== Collections ==
Some of his works have been in the permanent collection of institutions including the Smithsonian American Art Museum, the Gilcrease Museum, the Logan Museum of Anthropology, the Museum of New Mexico, the Philbrook Museum of Art, and the Southwest Museum of the American Indian.

== Death ==
Yazz died on June 20, 2021, at the age of 92.

== Works ==
- Spin a Silver Dollar: The Story of a Desert Trading-post (1945), by Alberta Hannum
- Paint the Wind (1958), by Alberta Hannum
- Yazz: Navajo Painter (1983), with Sallie Wagner and J.J. Brody
