= Annie Little Warrior =

Native American ledger artist from North Dakota, U.S. (1895–1966)

Annie Red Tomahawk
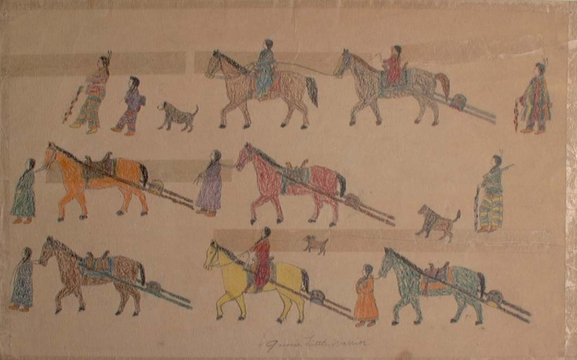
- Women and Horses, 20th century Ledger book drawing by Annie Little Warrior
- Born: Annie Little Warrior; December 17, 1895; Sioux County, North Dakota
- Died: March 24, 1988 (aged 92); Sioux County, North Dakota
- Citizenship: Standing Rock Sioux Tribe of North & South Dakota and American
- Education: self-taught
- Movement: Ledger art
- Spouse: Henry Red Tomahawk
- Patrons: Museum of the American Indian

Annie Little Warrior (1895–1988) was a Hunkpapa Lakota artist from the Standing Rock Sioux Reservation and an early woman ledger artist. Her married names were Annie Red Tomahawk and Mrs. Henry Red Tomahawk.

== Background ==
Born in 1895, Annie Little Warrior married Harry Red Tomahawk. They lived on the Standing Rock Sioux Reservation in North Dakota.

Authors Paula Calvin and Patricia Janis Broder believed that she was Cheyenne, because she depicted Cheyenne imagery in one of her drawings. Researchers at the National Museum of the American Indian identified her was being born in 1895, Hunkpapa Lakota, married to Harry Red Tomahawk, living on the Standing Rock Sioux Reservation, and dying in 1966. However, her grave says she died in 1988.

== Artwork ==
Little Warrior drew ledger art with graphite and crayon on paper. Her work is unusual in that it was narrative, rather than abstract as was much of the art produced by Native American women during those years. What little is known about her can be gleaned from internal clues in her drawings. She is known to have depicted the post-contact world, as one of her drawings contains a depiction of the American flag. Her pictures show rituals from the Plains Indian tribes; at least one is suspected to show a Cheyenne ritual, probably a War Dance, as the men illustrated wear headdresses typical of that tribe. Another work depicts the moving of a camp. This work is signed "Miss Annie Little Warrior" in a hand likely not her own; the prominence of the signature indicates that her identity as an artist carried considerable importance for her.

Five of her drawings are in the collection of the National Museum of the American Indian, Smithsonian Institution.
