= Nathan Begaye =

Native American artist

Nathan Scott Begaye
- Born: 1958; Phoenix, Arizona
- Died: December 2010 (aged 51–52)
- Education: Institute of American Indian Art (Santa Fe, New Mexico), New York State College for Ceramics at Alfred University.
- Known for: ceramics
- Movement: Postmodernist Indian Pottery

External images
- Photo of Nathan Begaye
- Snow Cloud, 1998
- Yeh! Bichai, 1980s
- Sorrow, Half Breed, 2005

Nathan Begaye (1958–2010) was a Native American ceramics artist of Navajo and Hopi descent.

== Background ==
Nathan Begaye was born in Phoenix, Arizona in 1958 to a Navajo father and a Hopi mother. He was raised by his maternal grandparents in the Third Mesa and Tuba City, Arizona. His aunt was noted Hopi potter Otellie Loloma. His upbringing in the Navajo/Hopi communities was steeped in tribal traditions, and he was schooled in the lore, history, religion, symbolism, and customs of the Navajo and Hopi peoples.

== Art career ==
Begaye's interest in pottery began early, at age 10, and he had his first public exhibition only one year later. He learned traditional techniques and pigment recipes from people in his tribal community, both Navajo and Hopi. As they were tribal secrets, he kept these to himself even when he became a teacher later in life. After receiving a SWAIA scholarship, he left home at age 14 to study ceramics at the Institute of American Indian Arts (IAIA) in Santa Fe, NM.

Although his upbringing was very conservative, Begaye used unexpected and unorthodox techniques in his work. Said to utilize a "maverick sense of form, texture, color, and design," Begaye's work was often personal and autobiographical.

== Notable collections ==
- Peabody Essex Museum, Salem, MA
- Robert Nichols Gallery, Santa Fe, NM
- Emerging Clouds, 1998 and Cloud, 2004 and untitled large jar, 2004, SM's-Stedelijk Museum 's-Hertogenbosch/NL

== Selected exhibition history ==
- Native American Art at the Museum of Fine Arts, Boston

Museum of Fine Arts, Boston, MA
November 20, 2010 – December 31, 2016

- Passionate Journey: The Grice Collection of Native American Art

Mint Museum of Art, Charlotte, NC
July 18, 2009 – October 17, 2009

- Intersections: Native American Art in a New Light

Peabody Essex Museum, Salem, MA
June 24, 2006 – November 27, 2011

- Free Spirit: The New Native American Potter

Stedelijk Museum’s, Hertogenbosch, Netherlands
2006

- Dualities: Nathan Begaye + Les Namingha + Dusty Naranjo

Museum of Contemporary Native Arts, Santa Fe, NM
May 12, 2006 – June 25, 2006

- American Indian Art at the Spencer Museum of Art

Spencer Museum of Art, University of Kansas, Lawrence, KS
September 6, 2003 - October 19, 2003

- Indian Market: New Directions in Southwestern Native American Pottery

Peabody Essex Museum, Salem, MA
November 16, 2001 – March 17, 2002

== See also ==
- Diego Romero (artist)
