= Ruddell and Nancy Laconsello =

Husband and wife team of Zuni-Diné jewelers

Ruddell and Nancy Laconsello are a husband and wife team of Diné–Zuni jewelers working in lapidary arts, inlay and silver work. Nancy Haloo Laconsello is A:shiwi (Zuni) and was born in 1952; and Ruddell is Diné (Navajo) and was born in 1959.

== Work ==
Nancy learned lapidary and inlay from her father, Jake Haloo, starting in 1972. The Laconsellos have been making jewelry together since 1976. In general, Nancy does the stone and shell inlay, and Ruddell does the silver-working. They are known for their finely detailed pictorial, channel inlay in stone and shell.

== Collections ==
Their works can be found in the permanent collection of the British Museum, the National Museum of the American Indian of the Smithsonian Institution, the School for Advanced Research's Indian Arts Research Center Collection, among other venues.
