= Robert Tenorio =

Kewa potter

- Born: December 29, 1950 (age 75); Kewa Pueblo, New Mexico, U.S.
- Education: Institute of American Indian Arts
- Occupation: Native American traditional potter

Robert Tenorio (born December 29, 1950) is a Kewa (Santo Domingo) potter.

== Early life ==
Robert Tenorio was born on December 29, 1950, on the Kewa Pueblo to parents Andrew and Juanita Tenorio, members of the Fire Clan. His paternal grandmother was potter Andrea Ortiz (1900–1993) and his maternal aunt was potter Lupe B. Tenorio (1902–1990). His siblings include potter Hilda Coriz (1949–2007), Paulita Pacheco (1943–2008), and Mary. His nephew is potter Ambrose Atencio (born 1963).

== Education and career ==
His aunt Lupe taught him in early life traditional pottery techniques, including the preparation of black paint made from Cleome serrulata (Rocky Mountain Bee Plant), and cream slip made from a green bentonite clay from the Cochiti Pueblo. Tenorio attended the Institute of American Indian Arts in Santa Fe and studied pottery under Otellie Loloma.

His work is typically signed as, "Robert Tenorio, KEWA, N.M." He often makes flared rim olla jars, bowls, and canteens in red, black and cream colors; that feature either a geometric design, or a floral or animal motif.

Tenorio has work in museum collections including at the Denver Art Museum, the National Museum of the American Indian, Musée du Nouveau Monde, and the Maxwell Museum of Anthropology.

== See also ==
- List of Native American artists
