= Rachel Concho =

Native American artist (born 1936)

- Born: 1936; Acoma Pueblo
- Known for: Seed jars
- Style: Pottery

Rachel Concho (born 1936) is a Native American artist and potter of the Acoma Pueblo. She is best known for her painted seed jars: small circular pots, nearly closed except for a small hole at the top, used for storing seeds from one harvest for planting in the next. She draws inspiration from ancient designs of the Acoma Pueblo including from shards associated with the Mimbres culture, which flourished in what is now New Mexico and Arizona from about 200 CE to the Spanish conquests of the sixteenth century. Concho has won many prizes for her work, including "Best in Show" at the Santa Fe Indian Market of 2000. Her seed jars have entered the permanent collections of several museums, including the Smithsonian Institution.

== Family, career, and accolades ==
Rachel Concho's family belongs to the Roadrunner Clan of the Acoma Pueblo. Her mother, Santana Cerno, taught her the art of pottery. Her brother, Joseph Cerno, and her daughter-in-law, Carolyn Lewis-Concho, are also artists.

While most of Concho's designs follow traditional patterns, she has also created designs that are not in the Acoma tradition, including one based on spiders.

In the book Southwestern Pottery: Anasazi to Zuni, Allan Hayes and John Blom included Rachel Concho among the "stars and superstars" of late twentieth-century Acoma ceramicists, and featured her seed jars as examples of work by "members of the elite corps" of this artistic community.

== Collections ==
Her works have entered the permanent collections of several museums. These include the Smithsonian National Museum of the American Indian, in Washington, DC; the Grice Collection of Native American Art of the Mint Museum in Charlotte, North Carolina; and the Krannert Art Museum of the University of Illinois at Urbana-Champaign.
