= Otellie Loloma =

Hopi artist, potter, dancer

- Born: Otellie Pasiyava; December 30, 1921; Second Mesa, Arizona
- Died: January 30, 1993 (aged 71)
- Other names: Ohille Loloma
- Citizenship: Hopi, American
- Known for: Hopi pottery
- Spouse: Charles Loloma
- Awards: Women's Caucus for Art Lifetime Achievement Award (1991)

Otellie Loloma (December 30, 1921 — January 30, 1993) was a Hopi Native American artist, specializing in pottery and dance. Additionally, she worked with her husband Charles Loloma on jewelry design.

== Early life and education ==
Otellie Pasiyava was raised on a Hopi reservation at Second Mesa, Arizona, and educated in schools run by the Bureau of Indian Affairs. She made clay objects from childhood, but began formal training in pottery at age 23, when she was invited to study on a scholarship at the School of the American Craftsman at Alfred University. She also attended Northern Arizona University and the College of Santa Fe.

== Career ==
Otellie Loloma ran a shop at the Kiva Craft Center in Scottsdale, Arizona with her husband in the 1950s. She was one of the first instructors hired for the Southwest Indian Art Project in Tucson, Arizona, a summer institute funded by the Rockefeller Foundation in 1960 to 1961.

She joined the faculty of the Institute of American Indian Arts in Santa Fe, New Mexico, when it opened in 1962, a position she held until her retirement in 1988. One of her notable students was potter Robert Tenorio (Kewa Pueblo). In 1991, she was honored with a Women's Caucus for Art Lifetime Achievement Award.

In addition to her expertise in pottery, Loloma taught Native American dance with colleague Josephine Myers-Wapp (Comanche); they performed at the White House and at the 1968 Summer Olympics with their students. In 1970, she was one of two women among eight diverse artists featured in an ABC documentary, "With These Hands: The Rebirth of the American Craftsman," along with Paul Soldner, Peter Voulkos, Dorian Zachai (the other woman artist), Clayton Bailey, James Tanner, Harry Nohr, and J. B. Blunk.

== Personal life ==
Otellie Pasiyava married Hopi jewelry designer Charles Loloma in 1947, and the marriage ended in divorce in 1965. Otellie Loloma died in 1993, age 71.

== Public collections ==
Works by Otellie Loloma are included in the permanent collections at the Museum of the American Indian, the Heard Museum, the Cooper-Hewitt Museum and the Philbrook Museum of Art, among other institutions.

Her nephew Nathan Begaye became an artist in pottery after his aunt. Her other notable students included painter Dan Namingha. Her friend and IAIA colleague, poet James A. McGrath, wrote a book of poems about (and dedicated to) Otellie Loloma, titled The Sun is a Wandering Hunter (2014).
