= Helen Hardin =

American painter (1943–1984)

- Tsa-sah-wee-eh (Tewa)
- Born: May 28, 1943; Albuquerque, New Mexico
- Died: June 9, 1984 (aged 41); Albuquerque, New Mexico
- Education: Southwest Indian Art Project at University of Arizona, University of New Mexico
- Known for: Painting, illustrator
- Spouse: Cradoc Bagshaw
- Awards: Heard Museum, Scottsdale National Indian Arts Exhibition, Philbrook Art Center, the Inter-Tribal Ceremonial at Gallup, New Mexico, Santa Fe Indian Market

Helen Hardin (May 28, 1943 – June 9, 1984) (Tewa: Tsa-sah-wee-eh, transl. "Little Standing Spruce") was a Tewa Native American painter. She started making and selling paintings, participated in the University of Arizona's Southwest Indian Art Project and was featured in Seventeen magazine, all before she was 18 years of age. Creating art was a means of spiritual expression that developed from her Roman Catholic upbringing and Native American heritage. She created contemporary works of art with geometric patterns based upon Native American symbols and motifs, like corn, katsinas, and chiefs. In 1976 she was featured in the PBS American Indian artists series.

== Early life and education ==
Helen Hardin was born on May 28, 1943, in Albuquerque, New Mexico, the daughter of Pablita Velarde, Santa Clara Pueblo artist, and Herbert Hardin, a European-American former police officer and Chief of Public Safety. Hardin's first language was Tewa. She was named Tsa-Sah-Wee-Eh at a naming ceremony at the Santa Clara Pueblo about a month after she was born. Hardin was raised by her artistic mother and her family at the Santa Clara Pueblo and she went to school and lived among the Anglo world for much of her life. She saw herself as "Anglo socially and Indian in [her] art." At six years of age Hardin won first prize for a drawing. Her works were sold when she was nine with her mother's at Gallup ceremonial events. Although she was influenced by her mother's techniques and works, Hardin wanted to create her own style. Her relationship with her mother became increasingly difficult as Hardin became more artistic and as a consequence of her parents' divorce in 1957 or 1959.

She studied drafting at Albuquerque's St. Pius X High School, a parochial Catholic school. In the summer of 1960 Hardin attended the University of Arizona's Southwest Indian Art Project, funded by the Rockefeller Foundation. Also while in high school she was featured in Seventeen magazine. In 1961 and 1962 she attended the University of New Mexico, where she studied architecture and art, although her mother wanted her to study business. Her mother also said she didn't like her paintings. Hardin considered her own work to be non-traditional, yet she was influenced by native pictographs, petroglyphs and pottery designs and the works of her teacher Joe Herrera, who was a Cubist from the Cochiti Pueblo.

Hardin's relationship with her high school boyfriend, Pat Terrazas, continued after graduation and they had a daughter, Margarete Bagshaw, in 1964. Hardin had to sneak opportunities to paint because both her boyfriend and her mother disapproved She went to Bogotá, Colombia in 1968 as a respite from the abusive relationship with Terrazas and an unhealthy relationship with her mother. She said of that time, "I awoke to the fact that I was twenty-four years old, I was locked into an unhappy [relationship], and I was not painting. I didn't know who I was or what I was. In search of personal freedom, I took Margarete... and left the country."

== Art ==
Her search for identity was woven with her spiritual explorations. She signed her paintings in her Indian name, Tsa-Sah-Wee-Eh, or Little Standing Spruce, to separate herself from her celebrated mother's reputation.

— Mary Stokrocki, School of Arts

Helen Hardin, The Woman Series: Changing Woman, Medicine Woman, and Listening Woman, 1981-1984

She was a studio artist, who from the 1960s to mid 1970s lectured and exhibited paintings at Albuquerque's Enchanted Mesa Gallery. Hardin's early artistic works were characterized as traditionally realistic and she signed them with her Tewa name, Tsa-Sah-Wee-Eh. She was influenced by her spirituality and the protective, supportive "angels" in her life.

Up to 26 layers of paint - including ink washes, acrylics, airbrush and varnish - were applied to create her works; Hardin painted tiny dots called stipples; spattered paint with a toothbrush, like Anasazi pottery; and applied transparent washes.

In 1964 Hardin made the painting Medicine Talk for her first major solo exhibition at Enchanted Mesa. While with her father in 1968 in Bogotá, Colombia, she began painting in earnest and had a successful show at the American Embassy, where she sold 27 paintings. Since her reputation in the United States was tied with her mother's success, she had not been sure the degree to which she had success based upon her own merit. In Colombia her success was based on her talent alone.

When she returned to United States, her art became more geometric and abstract, and she used deep colored paints. Hardin was said to have brought a "new look" to Native American art by New Mexico Magazine. The publicity was a turning point in her career, its publicity led to greater success and recognition. In 1971 she had a show in Guatemala City.

As her career matured and she gained confidence, Hardin became known for painting complex works that combined colorful images and symbols from her Native American heritage with modern abstract art techniques. Her work frequently incorporated images of women, chiefs, kachinas and designs from pueblo pottery, and integrated modern elements as her career advanced. For instance, the paintings of kachinas and blanketed chiefs integrated geometric patterns made with drafting templates, rulers and protractors. Kachinas, or heavenly messengers, had special spiritual meaning, similar to the saints from her Catholic tradition, connecting between people on earth and heaven.

She was filmed in 1976 for a series on American Indian artists for Public Broadcasting System (PBS), the only woman painter included. Other filmed artists included R. C. Gorman, Charles Loloma, Allan Houser, Joseph Lonewolf, and Fritz Scholder.

Via Gambaro Gallery, which was launched by Retha Walden Gambaro and Stephen Gambaro to spotlight contemporary Native American artists, included Hardin's work in its 1980 National American Indian Women's Art Show.

Bountiful Mother made in 1980 represents two aspects of motherhood from the Pueblo and Hopi culture: Corn Mother and Mother Earth. The cultivation and consumption of corn was so central to the pueblo culture that it was "... a living entity with a body similar to man's in many respects ...the people built its flesh into their own." In the work, the woman's fertility is symbolized by the kernels of blue corn of her body. In 1981 she made the self-portrait Metamorphosis: "The features were contained within a perfect circle, a Jungian archetype of psychic wholeness and the symbol for Hardin of life itself, but everything else about the painting was fragmented, jagged and asymmetrical," said Jay Scott, her biographer, of the "tormented pieces of her life."

At her death at the age of 41, Hardin was recognized as one of the finest and most innovative Indian artists of her generation. She was among the first modern Indian painters to combine her non-Indian art materials and techniques with an Indian sensibility, merging past and present in a new way.

— Liz Sonneborn

From 1980 through 1984, she completed 23 copper plate etchings, including a series that included Changing Woman, Medicine Woman, and Listening Woman. Creative Woman was intended to be part of the series but the she died before it was created. These etchings portrayed the "intellectual, emotional, and sensitive" aspects of womanhood.

Hardin was commissioned to create children's book illustrations for Clarke Industries and design coins for Franklin Mint's History of the American Indian series.

Hardin's work was part of Stretching the Canvas: Eight Decades of Native Painting (2019–21), a survey at the National Museum of the American Indian George Gustav Heye Center.

== Personal life ==
In 1973 Hardin married Cradoc Bagshaw, a professional photographer. Her relationship with her mother improved in the 1980s, and Velarde began to be supportive of her work. Hardin was diagnosed with breast cancer in 1981 and died in Albuquerque, New Mexico, on June 9, 1984.

== Awards ==
She received honors for her work at the Heard Museum, Scottsdale National Indian Arts Exhibition, Philbrook Art Center, the Inter-Tribal Ceremonial at Gallup, New Mexico, and the Santa Fe Indian Market. At these shows she won "Best of Show", first prize and grand awards.

== Collections ==
Her works are in the collections of:

- Heard Museum, Phoenix, Arizona
- Indian Arts & Crafts Board, U.S. Department of the Interior, Washington, D.C.
- Loyola Law School, Los Angeles, CA
- Millicent Rogers Museum, El Prado, New Mexico
- Museum of New Mexico, Santa Fe
- Southwest Museum, Los Angeles, CA
- University of Oklahoma Museum of Art, Norman
- Wheelwright Museum of the American Indian, Santa Fe, New Mexico.

== Works ==
A select number of her works include:

- Bountiful Mother, 1980, 45.7 × 40.64 cm, etching and intaglio
- Changing Woman
- Listening Woman
- Looking at Myself I Am Many Parts
- Medicine Talk, 1964, approximately 71.12 × 35.56 cm, casein
- Medicine Woman, 1981, approx. 61 × 45.7 cm, four-color copper plate etching.
