= Charles Loloma =

Native American jeweler (1921–1991)

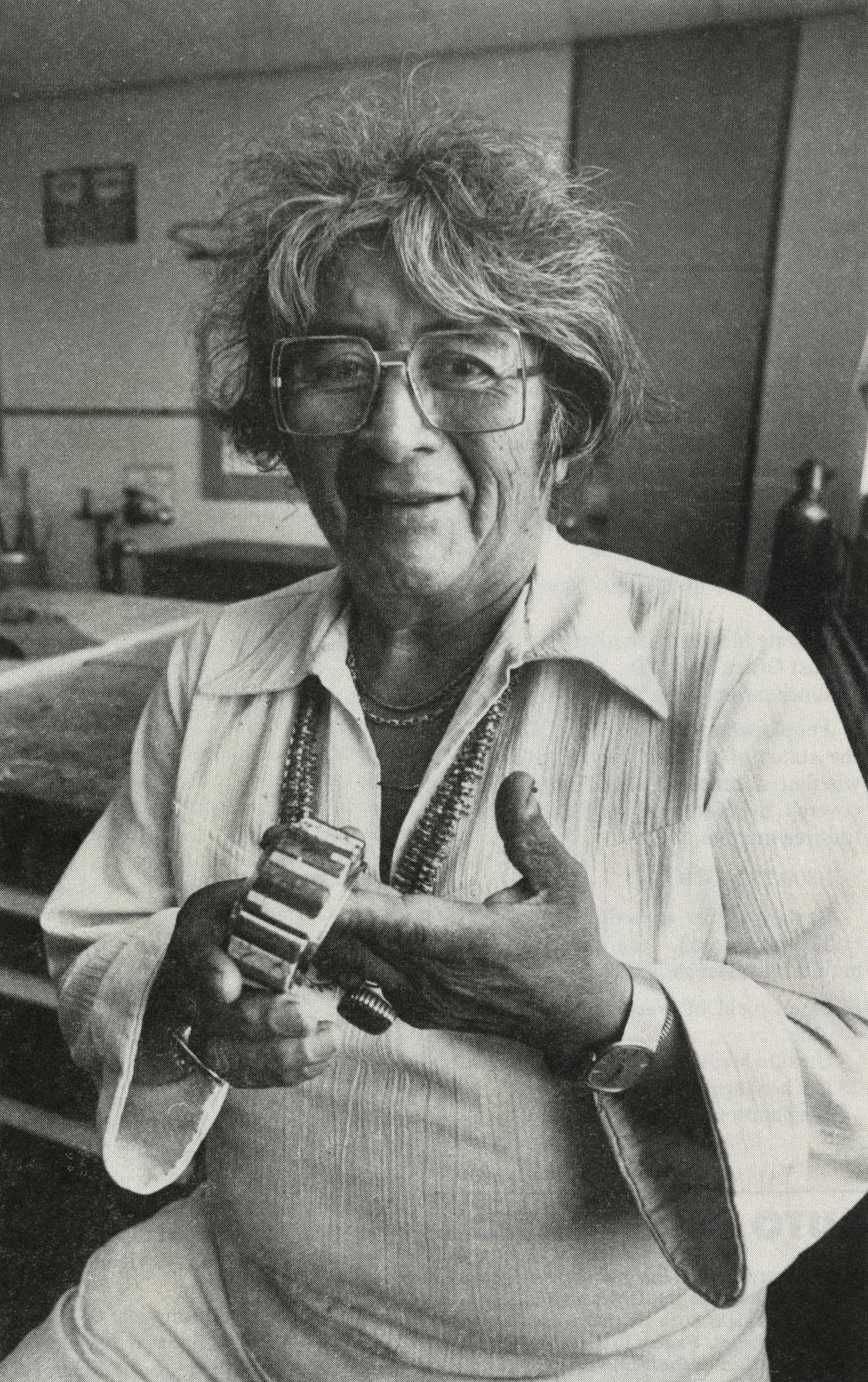
- Loloma in 1979
- Born: January 7, 1921; Hotevilla-Bacavi, Arizona
- Died: June 9, 1991 (aged 70)
- Citizenship: Hopi Tribe and US
- Known for: Jewelry, painting, pottery, sculpture
- Spouse: Otellie Loloma

Charles Sequevya Loloma (January 7, 1921 — June 9, 1991) was a Hopi Native American artist known for his jewelry. He also worked in pottery, painting and ceramics.

A highly influential Native American jeweler during the 20th century, Loloma popularized use of gold and gemstones not previously used in Hopi jewelry.

== Early life and education ==
He was born near Hotevilla, Hopi Third Mesa, to Rex Loloma and Rachel Kuyiyesva Loloma, to the Badger clan (his mother's clan). He attended Phoenix Indian High School in Arizona where he began his artistic career as a muralist and painter when he was asked by Fred Kabotie to assist in the reproduction of murals from the Awatovi site on the Hopi reservation for New York's Museum of Modern Art. Loloma later worked with Kabotie and René d'Harnoncourt on murals in the Federal Building on Treasure Island in San Francisco Bay for the Golden Gate International Exposition in 1939.

Charles married Otellie Pasiyava, a Hopi potter from Second Mesa, Arizona. He served in the United States Army from 1942 to 1945 with the 331st Army Engineers. He was stationed in the Aleutian Islands. In 1947, thanks to the GI Bill, and on the advice of Indian commissioner William H. Beatty, Loloma attended Alfred University's School for American Craftsmen in Alfred, New York. There, he and his wife Otellie both earned a Certificate in Pottery, which was presented on August 15, 1949. In the program, the Lolomas learned how to make stronger mixes of clay along with modern methods of forming and firing pieces, including glazes. Loloma's goal was to bring these techniques to the Hopi people to make them more self-sufficient.

== Career ==
In 1954, Loloma opened a pottery shop in Scottsdale, Arizona. He called his line of pottery Lolomaware.

Although he was an excellent potter and painter, Loloma found his true passion in jewelry making. Some of Loloma's designs were inspired by non-Native influences. This brought harsh judgment on his art by collectors. Comments made about his art included, "It's nice but it's not Indian." Loloma's work was rejected from the Gallup Inter-Tribal Ceremonial three times.

Most Southwestern Native jewelers use materials such as turquoise, silver, and occasional coral accents. Loloma used unconventional materials like sugilite, lapis, ivory, gold, pearls, diamonds, and even exotic woods. He used turquoise as an accent to his pieces. He drew inspiration from global societies. For example, he created Hopi interpretations of Egyptian deities. The jewelry of Charles Loloma was featured in the first Heard Museum Fair in 1961 and many more to follow.

In 1962, Lloyd Kiva New (Cherokee, 1916–2002) became the director of the Institute of American Indian Arts in Santa Fe and recruited Charles and Otellie Loloma as some of the first instructors of the institute, where Charles became the director of the plastic arts department. After a few years there, Loloma returned to Hotevilla and set up his own studio, also selling his jewelry in the Heard Museum Shop and several galleries. As his art evolved, he explored the techniques of tufa casting and inlay using stones of varying heights. His technique of including "inner gems" on the interior surfaces of his pieces expressed his belief that "people have inner gems. This is why I include inner gems in much of my work."

Loloma had many accomplishments across the globe. He won first prize in the Scottsdale National Indian Art Exhibition seven years in a row. He had several exhibitions in Paris. He was featured in NET and PBS in 1972. In 1974, he had an artist residency in Japan. He was also commissioned to make a piece for the queen of Denmark. He visited many countries including France, Egypt, and Colombia His achievements inspired other Native jewelers such as Jesse Monongye (Navajo).

Loloma's work was explored in a series on American Indian artists for the Public Broadcasting System (PBS). Other artists in the series included R. C. Gorman, Helen Hardin, Allan Houser, Joseph Lonewolf, and Fritz Scholder.

Although Loloma died in 1991, he remains an inspiration to Native artists. "We are a very serious people and have tried hard to elevate ourselves, but in order to create valid art you have to be true to your health and your heritage". When Martha Hopkins Struever, Loloma's biographer, asked him what he would like to be remembered for, he said, "What I'd like to be known for is beauty." Significantly, "Loloma" translates to "Beauty" in the Hopi language.
