= Ida Sahmie =

Navajo potter

Ida Sahmie (born Nobell 1960) is a Navajo potter. Sahmie combines Hopi traditional pottery making methods and Navajo iconography in her work. She has work in the Smithsonian American Art Museum and the Wheelwright Museum of the American Indian.

== Biography ==
Sahmie is Navajo and was born in 1960 outside of Pine Springs, Arizona. She married a Hopi man, Andrew "Louie" Sahmie, and moved to the Hopi reservation. She learned pottery making from her mother in law, Priscilla Namingha. Sahmie began to sell her pottery in the 1980s.

== Work ==
The shape of the pottery that Sahmie makes is based on Hopi traditions and incorporates traditional Navajo designs and iconography, such as Yei designs. Sahmie prefers to use clay mined from the Navajo reservation and uses white and yellow clay in the body of the pots. Black slip is created by adding wild spinach to the mixture. Pots are fired outdoors using traditional methods.

Sahmie has work in the Smithsonian American Art Museum, and the Wheelwright Museum of the American Indian.
