= La Jolla Band of Luiseño Indians =

Native Luiseño Indians in Southern California

La Jolla Band of Luiseno Indians
Total population
- 700 enrolled members

Regions with significant populations
- United States (California)

Languages
- Luiseño, English, and Spanish

Related ethnic groups
- other Luiseño people

The La Jolla Band of Luiseño Indians are a federally recognized tribe of Luiseño Indians, located in northern San Diego County, California, United States. There are five other federally recognized tribes of Luiseño in southern California. La Jolla has five Tribally Owned Enterprises, The La Jolla Trading Post, The La Jolla 76 Roadside Grill, The Luiseno Bike Park, The La Jolla Indian ZipZoom Zipline, and The La Jolla Indian Campground.

== Government ==
The La Jolla Band are headquartered in Pauma Valley, California. They are governed by a democratically elected, five-member tribal council, who serve two-year terms. The current administration is:

- Welsey Ruise Jr., Honorable Chairwoman
- Fred Nelson Jr, Honorable Vice-chairman
- Angela Miner, Honorable Secretary
- Joseph Amago, Honorable Treasurer
- John Paipa, Honorable Council Member.

== Reservation ==
Location of La Jolla Indian Reservation

The La Jolla Indian Reservation (33°15′52″N 116°52′32″W) was established in 1875 by executive order of President Ulysses S. Grant. The reservation is 9,998 acres (4,046 ha), with a population around 390. There are about 700 enrolled tribal members.

Much of the reservation land in the eastern Palomar Mountains is undisturbed wilderness. The San Luis Rey River flows through the reservation. The California montane chaparral and woodlands habitats includes diverse native plants, such as Coast live oaks (Quercus agrifolia), which provide acorns for traditional foods such as wiiwish.

The reservation contains a public campground, which is open from April to October. The La Jolla Indian Campground features include three miles (4.8 km) run of inner tubing down the San Luis Rey River.

=== Demographics ===
La Jolla Reservation, California – Racial and ethnic composition Note: the US Census treats Hispanic/Latino as an ethnic category. This table excludes Latinos from the racial categories and assigns them to a separate category. Hispanics/Latinos may be of any race.
| Race / Ethnicity (NH = Non-Hispanic) | Pop 2000 | Pop 2010 | Pop 2020 | % 2000 | % 2010 | % 2020 |
|---|---|---|---|---|---|---|
| White alone (NH) | 42 | 42 | 19 | 10.77% | 8.82% | 13.10% |
| Black or African American alone (NH) | 1 | 2 | 0 | 0.26% | 0.42% | 0.00% |
| Native American or Alaska Native alone (NH) | 271 | 353 | 83 | 69.49% | 74.16% | 57.24% |
| Asian alone (NH) | 1 | 2 | 1 | 0.26% | 0.42% | 0.69% |
| Native Hawaiian or Pacific Islander alone (NH) | 0 | 0 | 0 | 0.00% | 0.00% | 0.00% |
| Other race alone (NH) | 1 | 3 | 0 | 0.26% | 0.63% | 0.00% |
| Mixed race or Multiracial (NH) | 11 | 12 | 6 | 2.82% | 2.52% | 4.14% |
| Hispanic or Latino (any race) | 63 | 62 | 36 | 16.15% | 13.03% | 24.83% |
| Total | 390 | 476 | 145 | 100.00% | 100.00% | 100.00% |

=== Origin of the name ===
The reservation is located in North County, San Diego, far from the neighborhood of La Jolla in the city of San Diego. There is no evidence of any connection between the two. It is likely that the name La Jolla comes from a misspelling of the Spanish term hoya, referring to a hallow formed in the earth.

== History ==
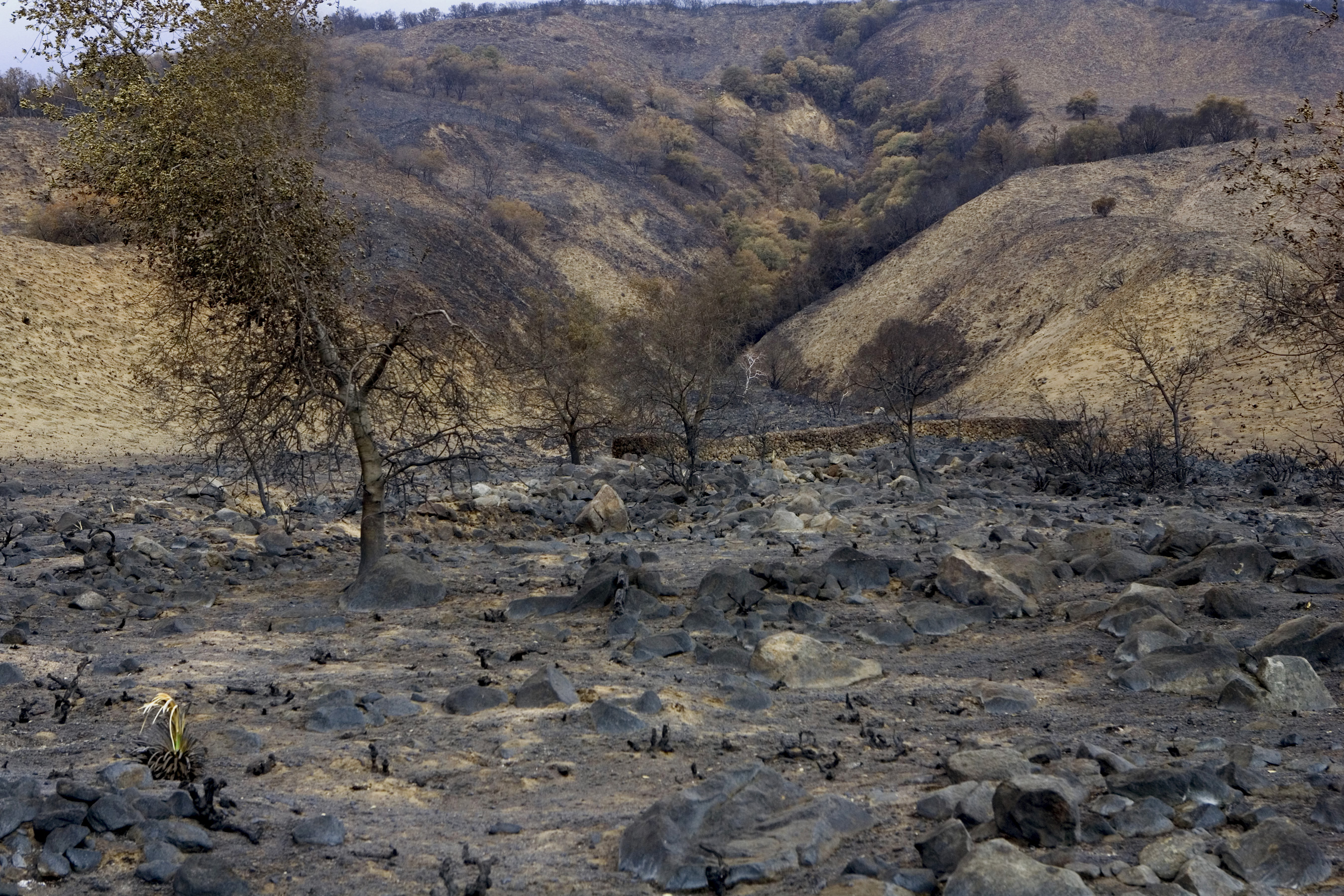
Reservation after fires, November 10, 2007. Landscape shows a wall built in the first half of the 20th century by the La Jolla tribe to prevent erosion and flooding from washing away their burial grounds

In 2007 the Poomacha Fire (or Mt. Palomar Fire) began as a structure fire on the La Jolla Indian Reservation; it got established on Palomar Mountain, joined the Witch Fire, and entered the Agua Tibia Wilderness. Because of steep terrain, it continued to burn after all other October 2007 fires were put out, finally being fully contained on November 9, 2007. The fire damaged 92% of the reservation. State and federal agencies, including the Federal Emergency Management Agency, provided aid to the tribe in a regional collaboration to rebuild and restore facilities. All of the residents were able to return to the reservation by the end of 2008.

== Tribal programs and initiatives ==
On March 6, 2011, the tribe worked with the LA84 Foundation and the Nike N7 Foundation to dedicate a new basketball court on the Reservation. The court will be used by La Jolla's young men and women, as well as for games and tournaments organized by Inter-Tribal Sports.

The tribe completed a new wastewater treatment facility and has broader plans for management of this issue. The Environmental Protection Agency's Tribal Border Infrastructure program funded construction of this facility, the second such facility in San Diego County, to treat septage from septic tanks on the Reservation. The La Jolla Tribe is also addressing the operation of septic systems by implementing a Tribal Collaborative for On-Site Wastewater Management. With support from EPA, the San Diego Foundation, Indian Health Service, Rural California Assistance Corporation, and Walking Shield, the Collaborative intends to implement an on-site wastewater management plan for La Jolla and other participating Tribes. This will ensure improved water quality for the San Luis Rey River watershed and reduce the overall cost of on-site wastewater management.

== Bibliography ==
- Pritzker, Barry M. A Native American Encyclopedia: History, Culture, and Peoples. Oxford: Oxford University Press, 2000. ISBN 978-0-19-513877-1
