= Julia F. Parker =

Native-American basket weaver

Julia Parker
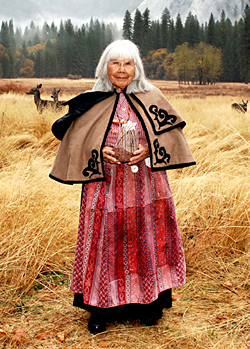
- Parker in 2007
- Born: Julia Florence; March 8, 1929 (age 97); Graton, California, U.S.
- Citizenship: Federated Indians of Graton Rancheria
- Education: Lucy Telles, Mabel McKay, Elsie Allen
- Known for: basket weaver
- Movement: Indigenous Californian basketry
- Patrons: Queen Elizabeth II

Julia Florence Parker (born March 8, 1929) is a Coast Miwok-Kashaya Pomo basket weaver.

Parker studied with indigenous Californian basketweavers: Lucy Telles (Yosemite Miwok-Mono Lake Paiute); Mabel McKay, (Cache Creek Pomo-Patwin) and Elsie Allen (Cloverdale Pomo). Over the last 40 years, Parker has become known as a skilled Native American basket maker. She is a respected elder of the Federated Indians of Graton Rancheria and long-time resident of Yosemite Valley.

Parker is an artist, teacher, and storyteller.

== Background ==
Julia Parker was born in March 1929 in Graton, California. Her father was Coast Miwok, and her mother was Kashaya Pomo. They both died when Parker was still young, so she and her siblings were sent to a Native American boarding school. In 1945, when Parker was 17 years old, she married Ralph Parker. Ralph, grandson of Lucy Telles, is thought to be the last fullblood Mono Lake Paiute. The couple moved to Yosemite, where Parker began her studies of basketry with Telles. She continued her training with Carrie Bethel, Minnie Mike, and Elsie Allen.

== Career ==
Since 1960, Parker has worked as a cultural specialist at the Yosemite Museum and interprets the cultural history of Yosemite Valley tribes to park visitors. She took over for Lucy Telles as the cultural demonstrator at the park. She demonstrates basket weaving and acorn processing. She has taught and lectured across the United States at universities, cultural centers, and schools. She has traveled to Alaska, Hawaii, and Australia to meet with indigenous artists and has been invited by numerous museums, including the National Museum of the American Indian, George Gustav Heye Center in New York City, to consult with specialists about collections stored in their facilities.

== Exhibitions and awards ==
In 2004, Parker's work was the subject of a major retrospective exhibition, The Past in Present Tense: Four Decades of Julia Parker Baskets, curated by Deborah Valoma and installed at the Bedford Gallery in Walnut Creek. In the same year she was featured in a segment of KQED television's program, Spark.

Parker's work is in permanent collections of the National Museum of Natural History, Smithsonian Institution, Washington, DC; the Yosemite Museum, Yosemite National Park; the Norwegian Ski Association headquarters, Oslo, Norway; the private collection of Queen Elizabeth II of the United Kingdom; and numerous other private collections.

In 2006, California College of the Arts conferred an honorary doctorate on Parker; in May 2021 she received an honorary doctorate from California State University, Fresno.

In 2007, Parker was the recipient of a National Heritage Fellowship from the National Endowment for the Arts, the United States' highest honor in the folk and traditional arts.
