= Tina Charlie =

Native North American basketweaver

Degikup polychrome basket made by Tina Charlie in 1926. Won 2nd Prize at the 1926 Yosemite Indian Field Days, and sold in 2005 for $248,250

Tina Charlie (born Tina Jim in Mono Lake, California; 1869–1962) was a Native North American basketweaver. Affiliated with the Kucadikadi tribe, she wove baskets for her own use and that of others in the tribe. An innovative weaver, she incorporated materials and motifs that were not common in the Mono Lake Paiute basketweaving tradition. In the 1920s, she produced fancy three-rod woven baskets for non-Indian markets and continued making them until her death. In the 1880s, she married Young Charlie, a Paiute man from Yosemite. She was married to the same man as her sister, Nellie. She lived with her sister for the rest of her life, and they likely influenced each other's craft.

In 2006, one of Tina Charlie's baskets sold for a then-record price of $336,250, three times the presale estimate. Another of her baskets sold for $248,250. Both were collected by Ella Cain of Bridgeport, California in the 1920s, and were formerly displayed at the Bridgeport Museum.

== Work ==
Tina Charlie is recognized as an innovative weaver for her finely crafted baskets. She received recognition during the Yosemite Indian Field Days, for which she was known to enter baby baskets. Competitive events such as these would allow her to earn additional income and reputation. She created one of the earliest-documented negatively patterned baskets at the 1925 and 1926 Yosemite Indian Field Days basketry competitions. The baskets had black backgrounds, using black-dyed bracken fern root as the main sewing material, and patterned with buff-colored sedge root and red-brown split redbud. Her motifs were derived by adapting patterns from the Maidu tradition.

== Exhibitions ==
This list of exhibitions was sourced from the St. James Guide to Native North American Artists.

- Bishop Harvest Days, Bishop, California (1916)
- Indian Field Days, Yosemite Valley, California (1925)
- Indian Field Days, Yosemite Valley, California (1926)
- Indian Field Days, Yosemite Valley, California (1929)
- Wai-Pai-Shone Trading Post, Stewart, Nevada (1930s)
- Mono County Museum, Bridgeport, California (1970–1988)
- Yosemite Museum, Yosemite National Park, California (1971–1996)

== Collections ==
This list of collections was sourced from the St. James Guide to Native North American Artists.

- Redding Museum and Art Center, Redding, California
- Yosemite Museum, National Park Service, Yosemite National Park
