= Basket weaving =

Weaving of pliable materials to make three-dimensional artifacts

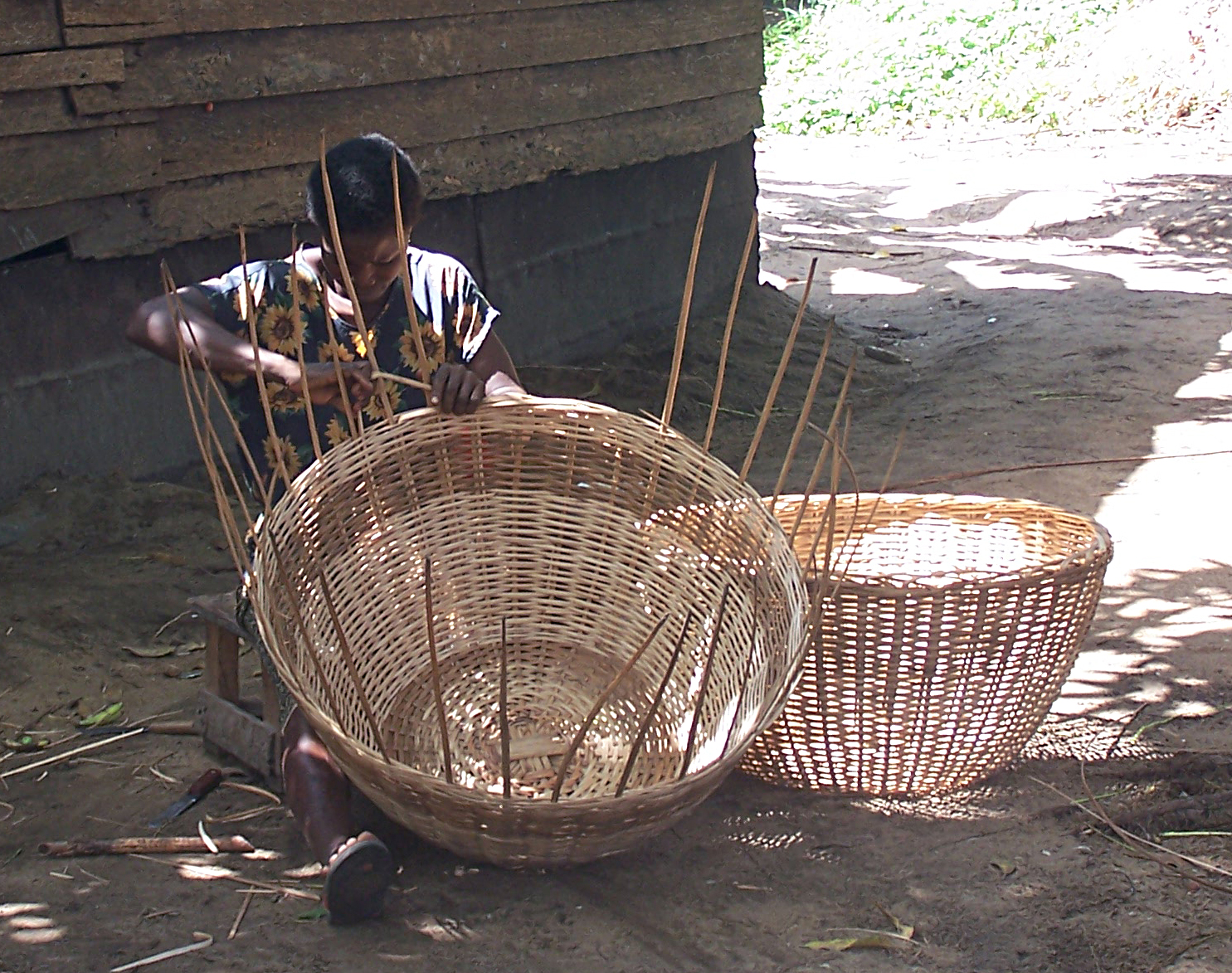
A woman weaves a basket in Cameroon

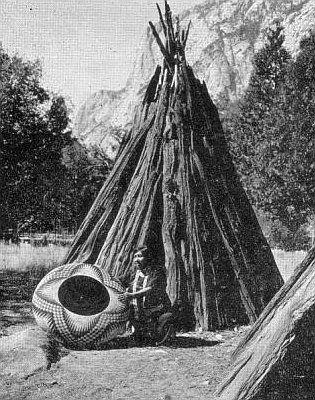
Artist Lucy Telles and large basket, in Yosemite National Park, 1933

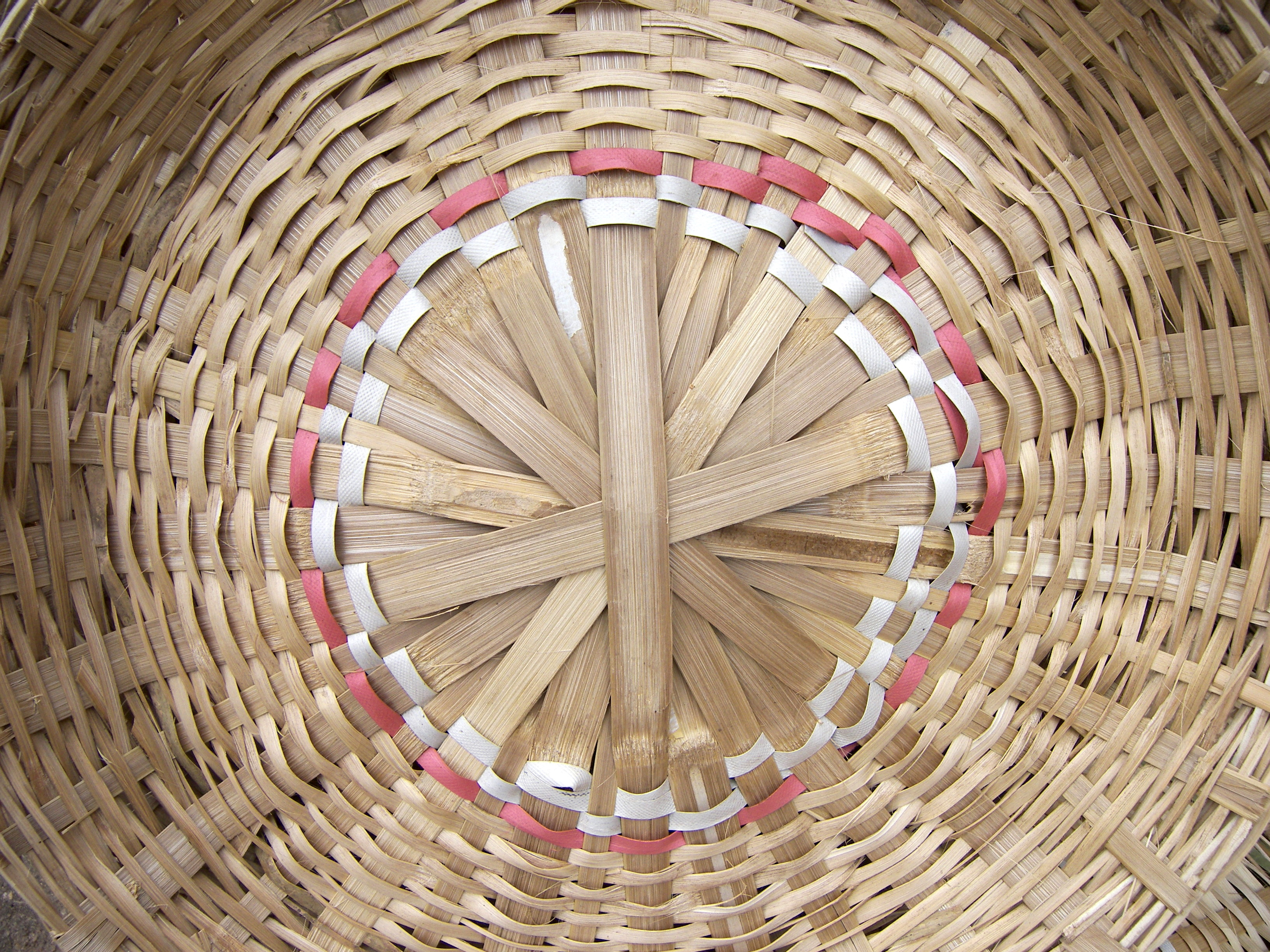
Woven bamboo basket for sale in K. R. Market, Bangalore, India

Basket weaving (also basketry or basket making) is the process of weaving or sewing pliable materials into objects, such as baskets, mats, mesh bags or even furniture. Craftspeople and artists specialized in making baskets may be known as basket makers and basket weavers. Basket weaving is also a rural craft. It is also widely known in Middle Eastern regions such as Cyprus.

Basketry is made from a variety of fibrous or pliable materials—anything that will bend and form a shape. Examples include pine, straw, willow (esp. osier), oak, wisteria, forsythia, vines, stems, fur, hide, grasses, thread, and fine wooden splints. There are many applications for basketry, from simple mats to hot air balloon gondolas.

Many Indigenous peoples are renowned for their basket-weaving techniques.

== History ==
While basket weaving is one of the most widespread crafts in the history of any human civilization, it is hard to say just how old the craft is, because natural materials like wood, grass , and animal remains decay naturally and constantly. Techniques used in basket weaving have been indistinguishable from rope-making and evidenced throughout the world since the beginning of recorded hominin presence in South Africa with the repeat discovery of perforated batons. Due to the degradation of natural materials over the millennia, researchers have no specimens to analyze, even though modern tradition includes the use of water-proofing or hardening with additional materials like clay or bitumen. Instead, assumptions of ancient basket weaving methods rely on the study (and assumed usage) of ancient tools combined with observations of modern and protomodern basket weaving in civilizations that still rely on sustainable methods culturally passed down since those ancient times.

=== Middle East ===
The earliest reliable evidence for basket weaving technology in the Middle East comes from the Pre-Pottery Neolithic phases of Tell Sabi Abyad II and Çatalhöyük. Although no actual basketry remains were recovered, impressions on floor surfaces and on fragments of bitumen suggest that basketry objects were used for storage and architectural purposes. The extremely well-preserved Early Neolithic ritual cave site of Nahal Hemar yielded thousands of intact perishable artefacts, including basketry containers, fabrics, and various types of cordage. Additional Neolithic basketry impressions have been uncovered at Tell es-Sultan (Jericho), Netiv HaGdud, Beidha, Shir, Tell Sabi Abyad III, Domuztepe, Umm Dabaghiyah, Tell Maghzaliyah, Tepe Sarab, Jarmo, and Ali Kosh.

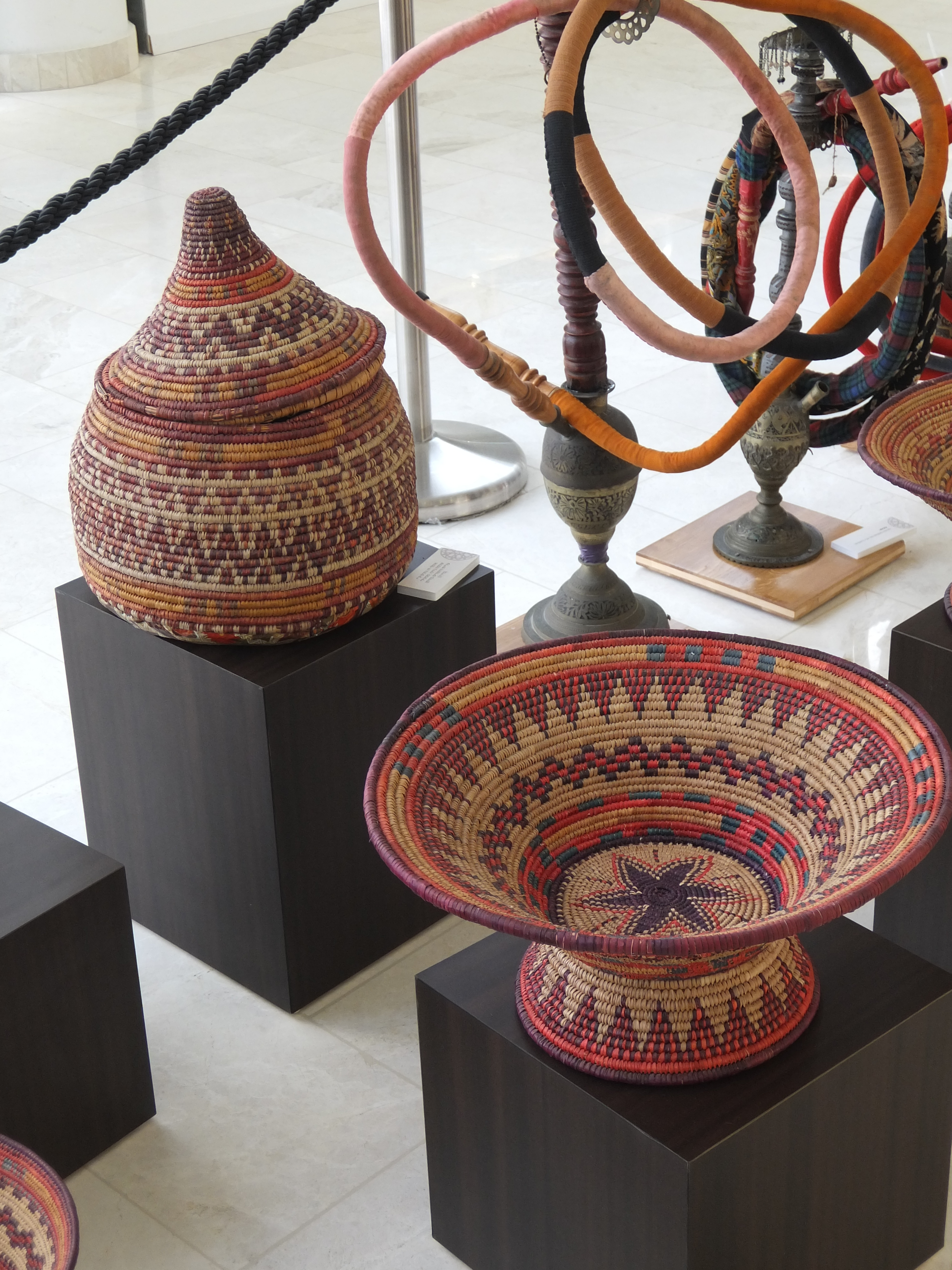
Woven baskets made of rush and palm fronds

The oldest known baskets were discovered in Faiyum in upper Egypt and have been carbon dated to between 10,000 and 12,000 years old, earlier than any established dates for archaeological evidence of pottery vessels, which were too heavy and fragile to suit far-ranging hunter-gatherers. The oldest and largest complete basket, discovered in the Negev in the Middle East, dates to 10,500 years old. However, baskets seldom survive, as they are made from perishable materials. The most common evidence of a knowledge of basketry is an imprint of the weave on fragments of clay pots, formed by packing clay on the walls of the basket and firing.

=== Industrial Revolution ===
During the Industrial Revolution, baskets were used in factories and for packing and deliveries. Wicker furniture became fashionable in Victorian society.

=== World Wars ===
During the World Wars, some pannier baskets were used for dropping supplies of ammunition and food to the troops.

== Types ==
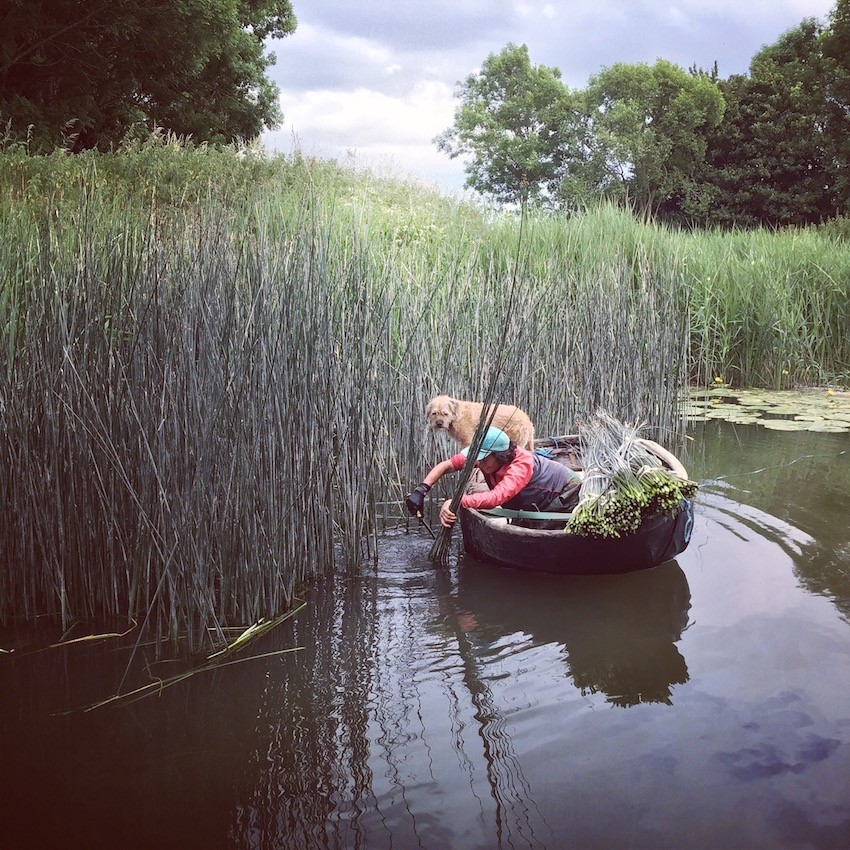
Collecting rushes for basket weaving in Somerset

Basketry may be classified into four types:

- Coiled basketry, using grasses, rushes and pine needles
- Plaiting basketry, using materials that are wide and braid-like: palms, yucca or New Zealand flax
- Twining basketry, using materials from roots and tree bark. This is a weaving technique where two or more flexible weaving elements ("weavers") cross each other as they weave through the stiffer radial spokes.
- Wicker and Splint basketry, using materials like reed, cane, willow, oak, and ash

== Materials used in basketry ==
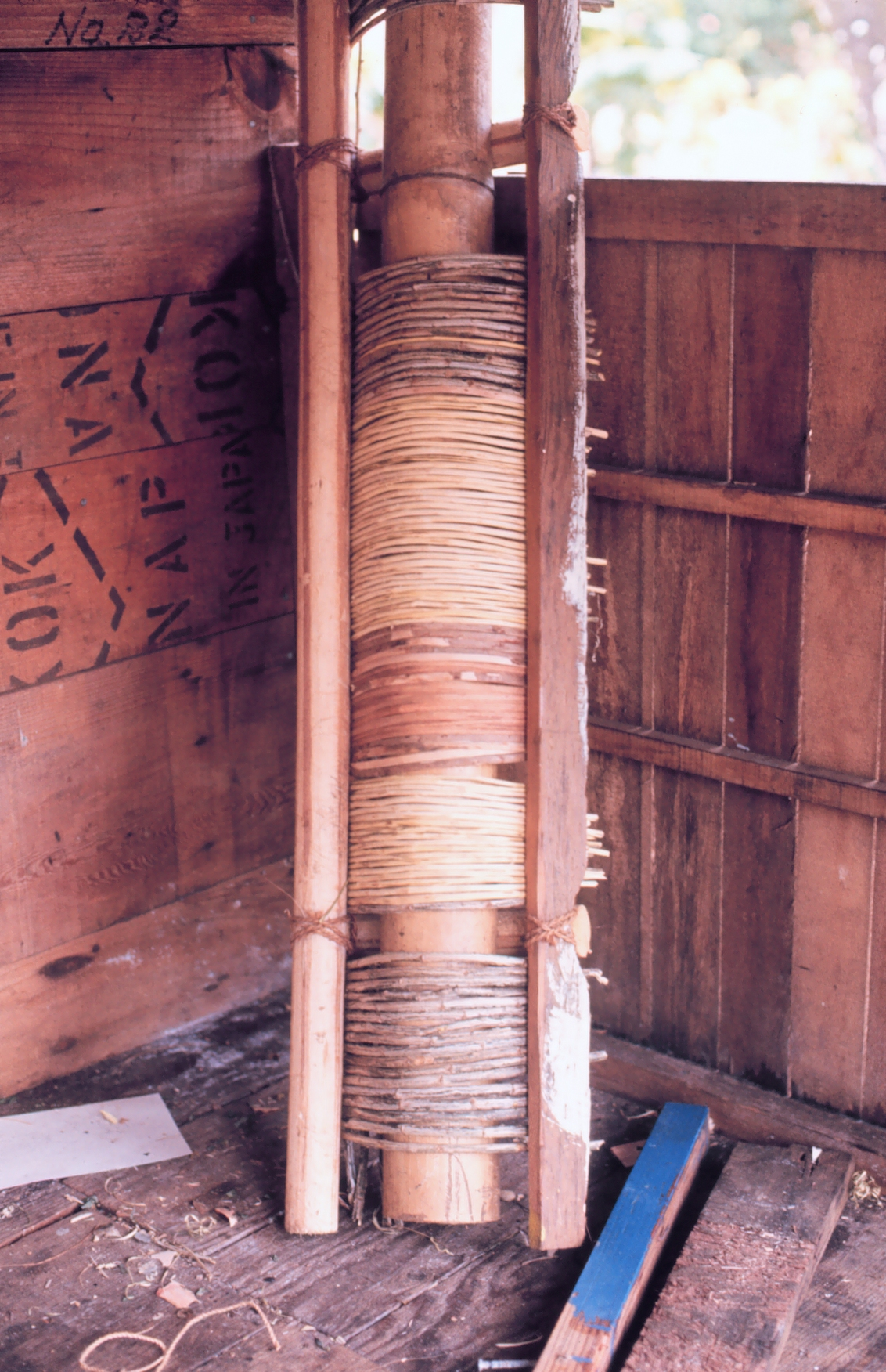
Bending vines for basket construction in Pohnpei

Weaving with rattan core (also known as reed) is one of the more popular techniques being practiced, because it is easily available. It is pliable, and when woven correctly, it is very sturdy. Also, while traditional materials like oak, hickory, and willow might be hard to come by, reed is plentiful and can be cut into any size or shape that might be needed for a pattern. This includes flat reed, which is used for most square baskets; oval reed, which is used for many round baskets; and round reed, which is used to twine. Another advantage is that reed can also be dyed easily to look like oak or hickory.

Many types of plants can be used to create baskets, including dog rose, honeysuckle, blackberry briars with the thorns scraped off and many other creeping plants. Willow was used for its flexibility and the ease with which it could be grown and harvested. Willow baskets were commonly referred to as wickerwork in England.

Water hyacinth is used as a base material in some areas where the plant has become a serious pest. For example, a group in Ibadan led by Achenyo Idachaba have been creating handicrafts in Nigeria.

Other materials used in basketry include cedar bark, cedar root, spruce root, cattail leaves and tule. Some elements that may be used for decoration include maidenhair fern stems, horsetail root, red cherry bark and a variety of grasses. These materials vary widely in color and appearance.

=== Vine ===
Because vines have always been readily accessible and plentiful for weavers, they have been a common choice for basketry purposes. The runners are preferable to the vine stems because they tend to be straighter. Pliable materials like kudzu vine to more rigid, woody vines like bittersweet, grapevine, honeysuckle, wisteria and smokevine are good basket weaving materials. Although many vines are not uniform in shape and size, they can be manipulated and prepared in a way that makes them easily used in traditional and contemporary basketry. Most vines can be split and dried to store until use. Once vines are ready to be used, they can be soaked or boiled to increase pliability.

=== Wicker ===
The type of baskets that reed is used for are most often referred to as "wicker" baskets. A popular type of weaving known as "twining" is a technique used in most wicker baskets.

== Process ==
The parts of a basket are the base, the side walls, and the rim. A basket may also have a lid, handle, or embellishments. Most baskets begin with a base. The base can either be woven with reed or wooden. A wooden base can come in many shapes to make a wide variety of shapes of baskets. The "static" pieces of the work are laid down first. In a round basket, they are referred to as "spokes"; in other shapes, they are called "stakes" or "staves". Then the "weavers" are used to fill in the sides of a basket. A wide variety of patterns can be made by changing the size, colour, or placement of a certain style of weave. To achieve a multi-coloured effect, aboriginal artists first dye the twine and then weave the twines together in complex patterns.

== Basketry around the world ==
=== Asia ===
==== South Asia ====
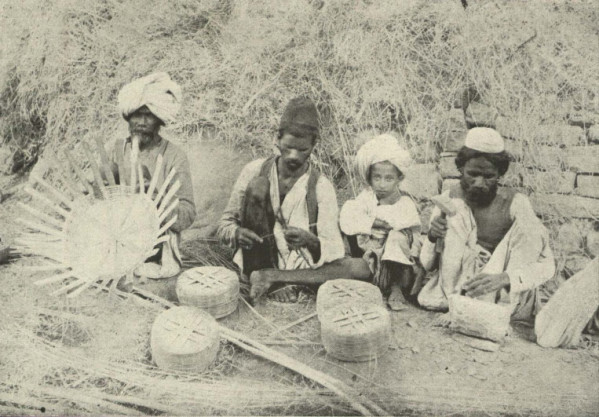
Punjabi basketmakers, c. 1905

Basketry exists throughout the Indian subcontinent. Since palms are found in the south, basket weaving with this material has a long tradition in Tamil Nadu and surrounding states.

==== East Asia ====
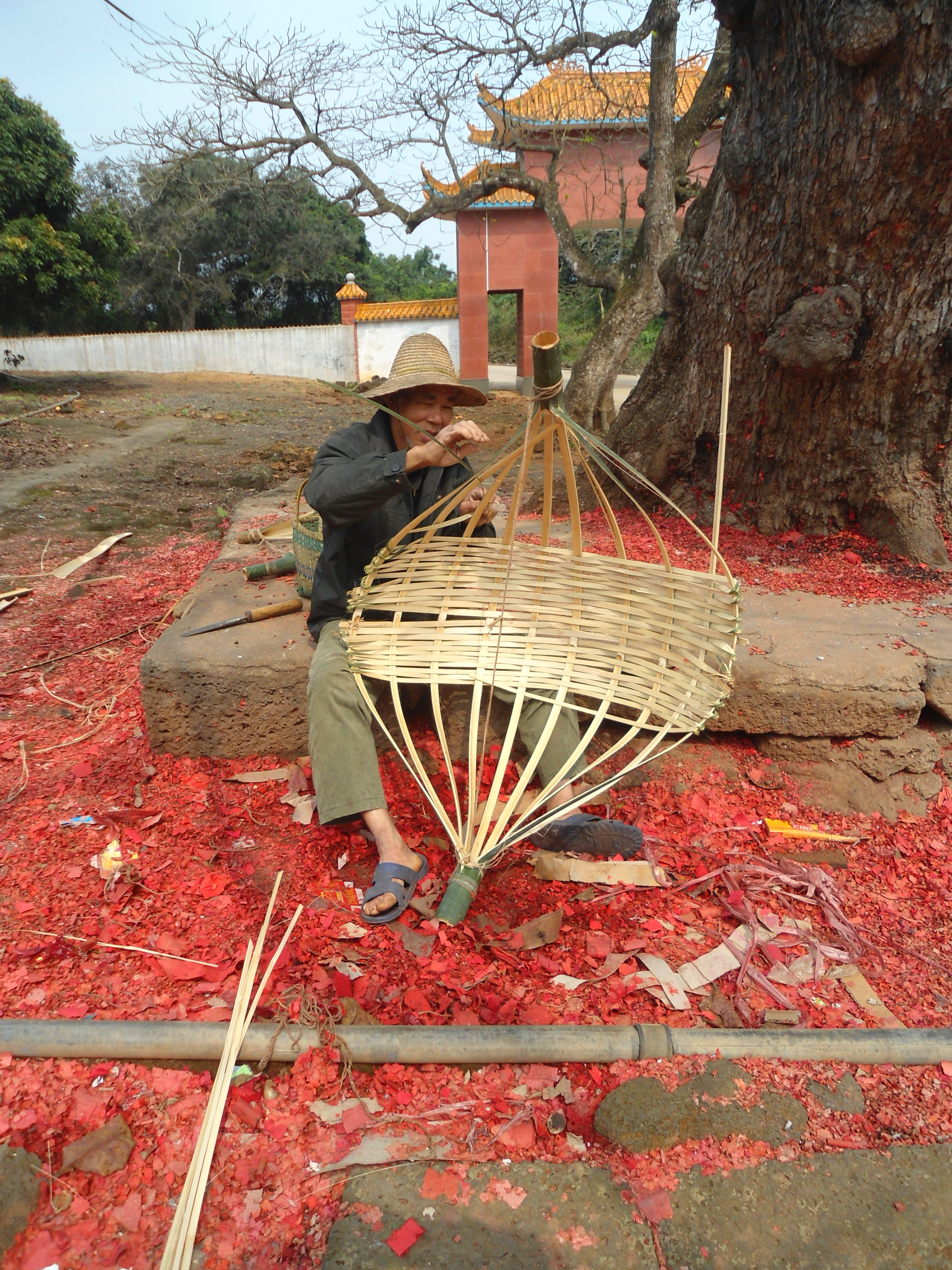
Basket making in Hainan, China. The material is bamboo strips.

Chinese bamboo weaving, Taiwanese bamboo weaving, Japanese bamboo weaving and Korean bamboo weaving go back centuries. Bamboo is the prime material for making all sorts of baskets, since it is the main material that is available and suitable for basketry. Other materials that may be used are ratan and hemp palm.

In Japan, bamboo weaving is registered as a traditional Japanese craft (工芸, kōgei) with a range of fine and decorative arts.

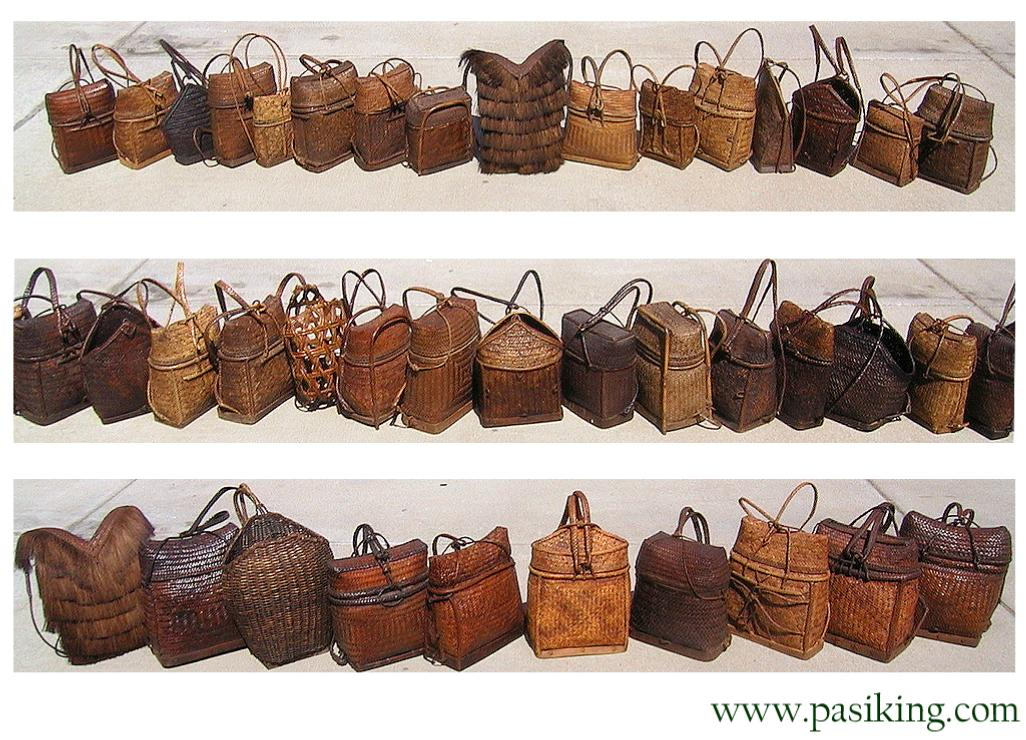

=== Southeast Asia ===
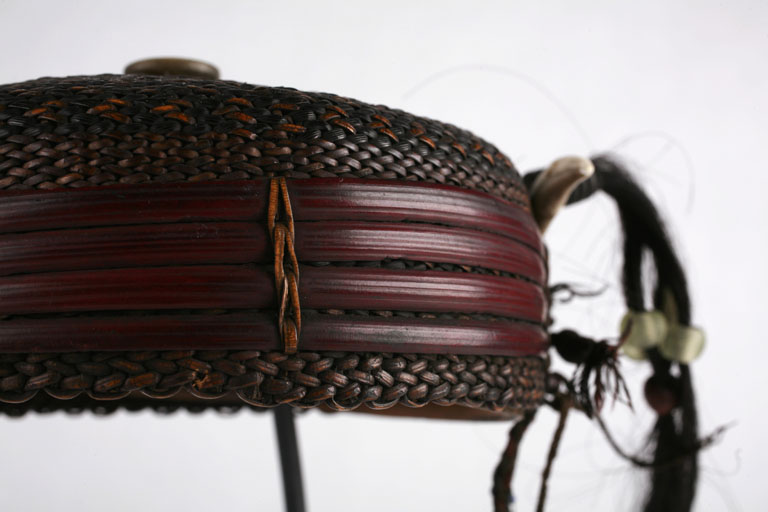
A falaka crafted by the Bontoc people of the Philippines.

Southeast Asia has thousands of sophisticated forms of indigenous basketry produce, many of which use ethnic-endemic techniques. Materials used vary considerably, depending on the ethnic group and the basket art intended to be made. Bamboo, grass, banana, reeds, and trees are common mediums.

=== Oceania ===
==== Polynesia ====
Basketry is a traditional practice across the Pacific islands of Polynesia. It uses natural materials like pandanus, coconut fibre, hibiscus fibre, and New Zealand flax according to local custom. Baskets are used for food and general storage, carrying personal goods, and fishing.

==== Australia ====
Basketry has been traditionally practised by the women of many Aboriginal Australian peoples across the continent for centuries.

The Ngarrindjeri women of southern South Australia have a tradition of coiled basketry, using the sedge grasses growing near the lakes and mouth of the Murray River.

The fibre basketry of the Gunditjmara people is noted as a cultural tradition, in the World Heritage Listing of the Budj Bim Cultural Landscape in western Victoria, Australia, used for carrying the short-finned eels that were farmed by the people in an extensive aquaculture system.

=== North America ===
==== Native American basketry in Canada ====
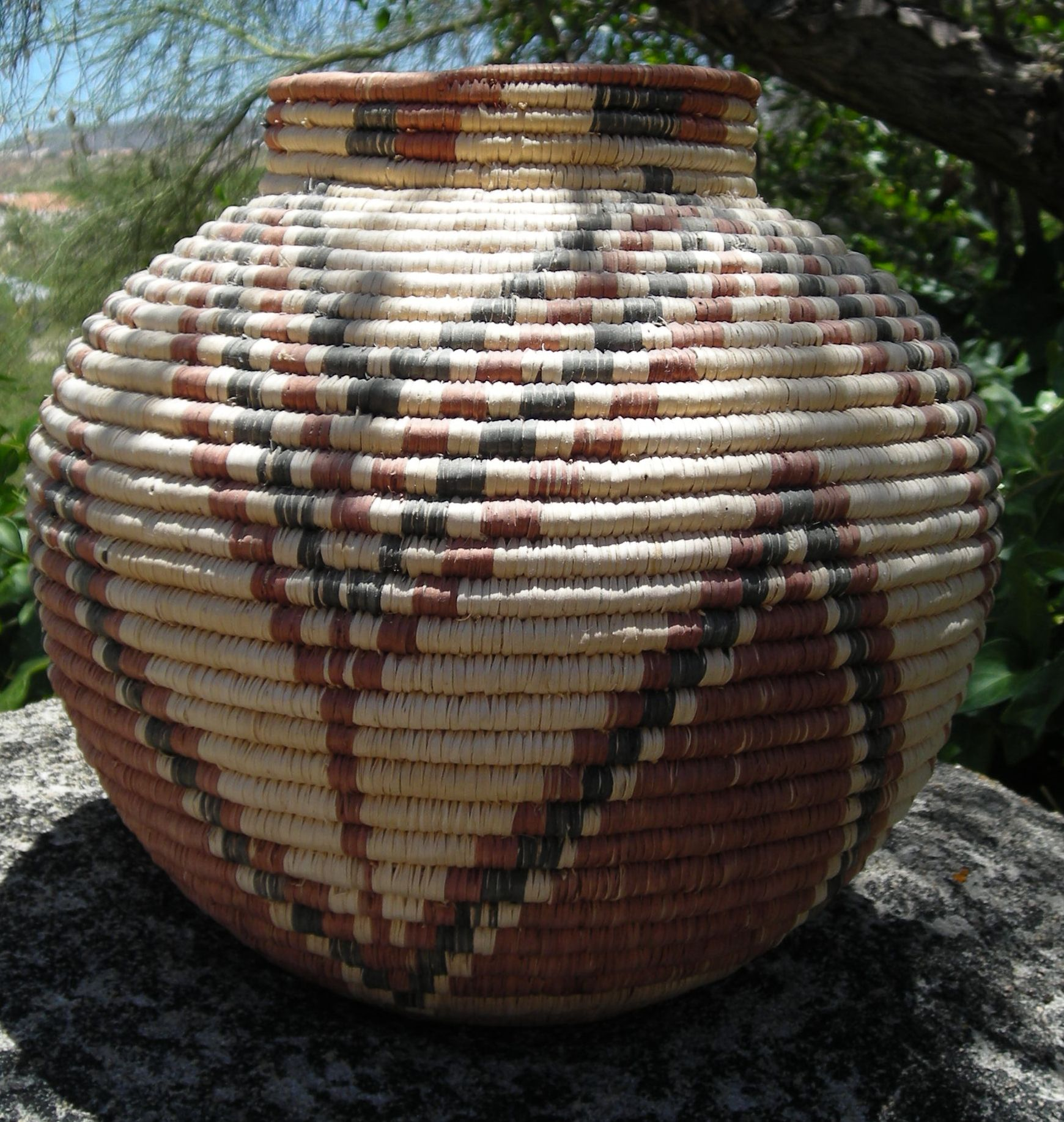
A Seri basket of the haat hanóohcö style, Sonora, Mexico

Native Americans traditionally make their baskets from the materials available locally.

===== Arctic and Subarctic =====
Arctic and Subarctic tribes use sea grasses for basketry. At the dawn of the 20th century, Inupiaq men began weaving baskets from baleen, a substance derived from whale jaws, and incorporating walrus ivory and whale bone in basketry.

===== Northeastern =====
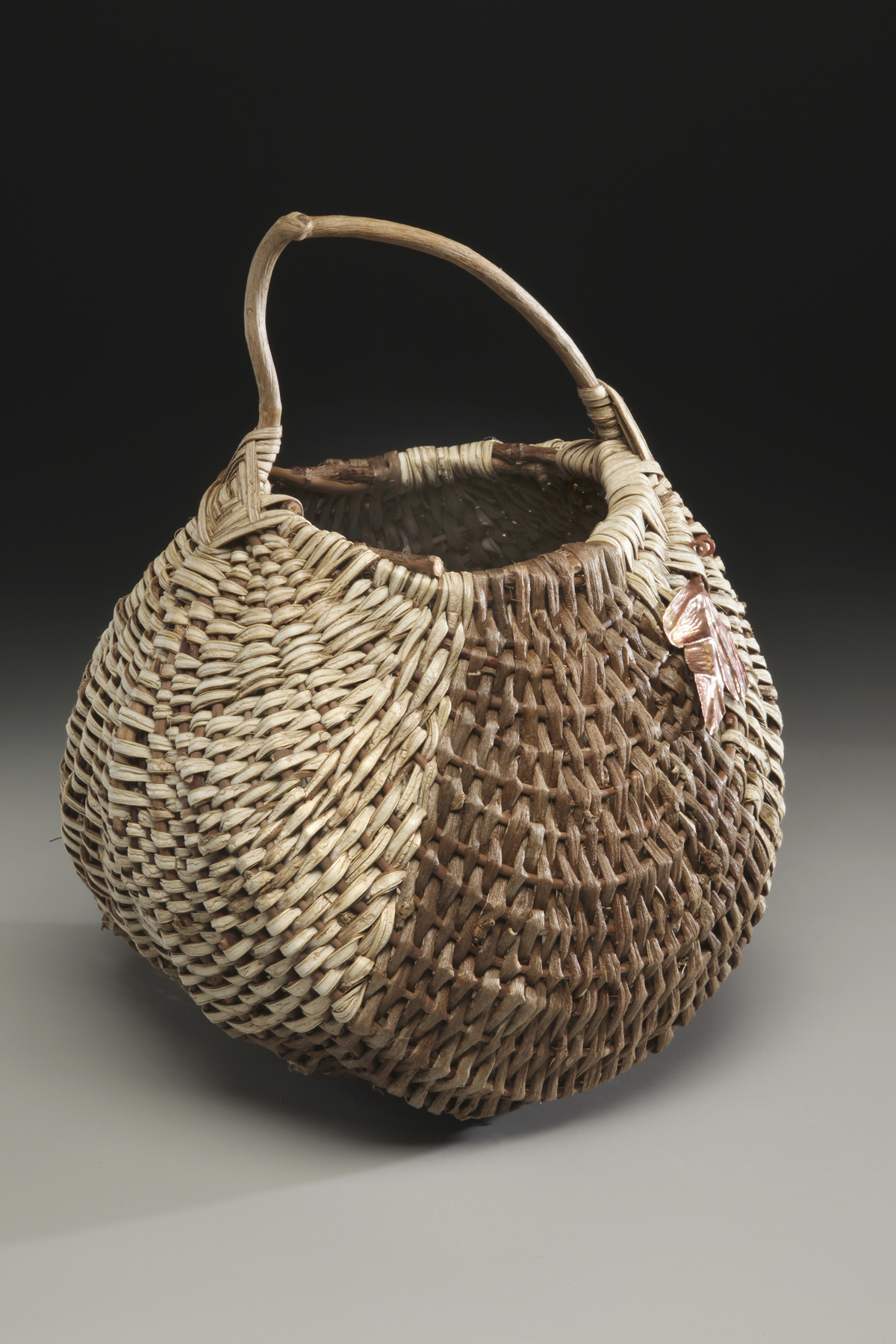
Handmade kudzu basket made in the Appalachian Oriole style

In Mi'kma'ki (composed of now Nova Scotia, New Brunswick and eastern Quebec, Canada), the Mi’kmaq used plants and animals for their fibre and dye sources in their basketry. Two archaeological sites revealed traditional materials of moose-tendon fibres, cattail plant (Typha latifolia), true rush (Scirpus lacustris), sweetgrass (Hierochloe odorata), American beach grass (Amophilia brevingulata), birch tree (Betula papyrifera), white cedar (Thuja occidentalis), basswood (Tilia Americana), black ash (Fraxinus nigra), white ash (Fraxinus americana), poplar (Populus tremuloides), and red maple (Acer rubrum). Black ash, or wosqoq, basketry is a vital part of Mi'kmaw culture and art. Baskets were functional, used in agriculture, and also decorative. Mi'kmaw basket makers were renowned for their intricate patterns woven in bright colours.

=== Native American basketry in the United States ===
==== Northeastern ====
In New England, traditional baskets are woven from Swamp Ash. The wood is peeled off a felled log in strips, following the growth rings of the tree. In Maine and the Great Lakes regions, traditional baskets are woven from black ash splints. Pack baskets from the Adirondack region have traditionally been woven from black ash or willow. Baskets are also woven from sweet grass, as is traditionally done by Canadian indigenous peoples. Birchbark is used throughout the Subarctic, by a wide range of peoples from the Dene to Ojibwa to Mi'kmaq. Birchbark baskets are often embellished with dyed porcupine quills. Some of the more notable styles are Nantucket baskets and Williamsburg baskets. Nantucket baskets are large and bulky, while Williamsburg Baskets can be any size, so long as the two sides of the basket bow out slightly and get larger as it is woven up.

- Jeremy Frey (Wabanaki Confederacy)
- Kelly Church (Grand Traverse Band of Ottawa and Chippewa Indians)
- Edith Bondie (Chippewa Indians)

===== Southeastern =====
Southeastern peoples, such as the Atakapa, Cherokee, Choctaw, and Chitimacha, traditionally use split river cane for basketry. A particularly difficult technique for which these peoples are known is double-weave or double-wall basketry, in which each basketry is formed by an interior and exterior wall seamlessly woven together. Doubleweave, although rare, is still practiced today, for instance by Mike Dart (Cherokee Nation).

- Rowena Bradley (Cherokee Nation)
- Mike Dart (Cherokee Nation)

===== Northwestern =====
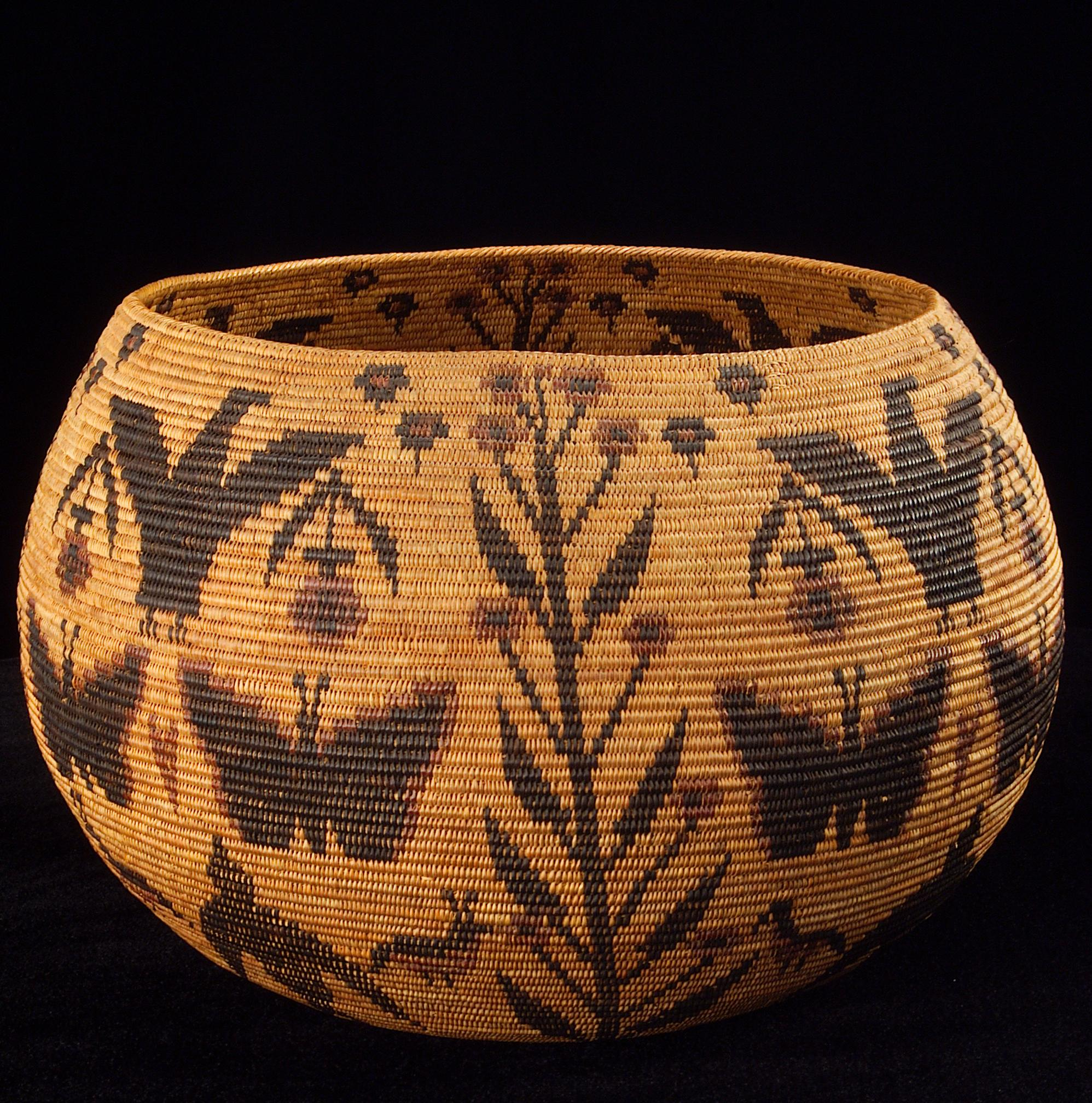
A basket made by the Mono Lake Paiute - Kucadikadi (Northern Paiute) and Southern Sierra Miwok (Yosemite Miwok) artisan Lucy Telles

Northwestern peoples use spruce root, cedar bark, and swampgrass. Ceremonial basketry hats are particularly valued by Northwest peoples and are worn today at potlatches. Traditionally, women wove basketry hats, and men painted designs on them. Delores Churchill is a Haida from Alaska who began weaving in a time when Haida basketry was in decline, but she and others have ensured it will continue by teaching the next generation.

- Delores Churchill (Haida)
- Joe Feddersen (Colville)
- Boeda Strand (Snohomish)

===== Californian and Great Basin =====
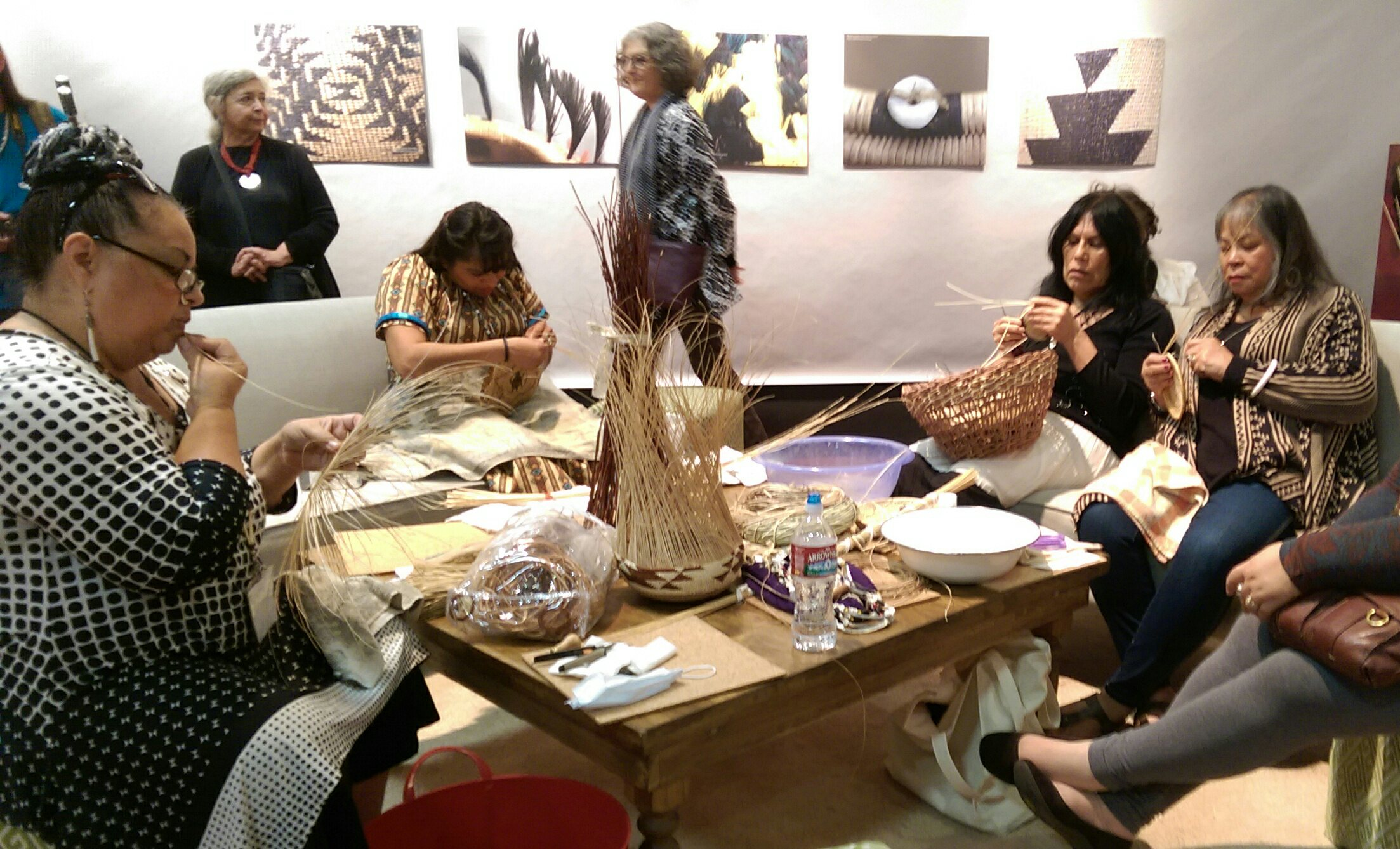
Native American basket weavers working in San Rafael, California in 2015

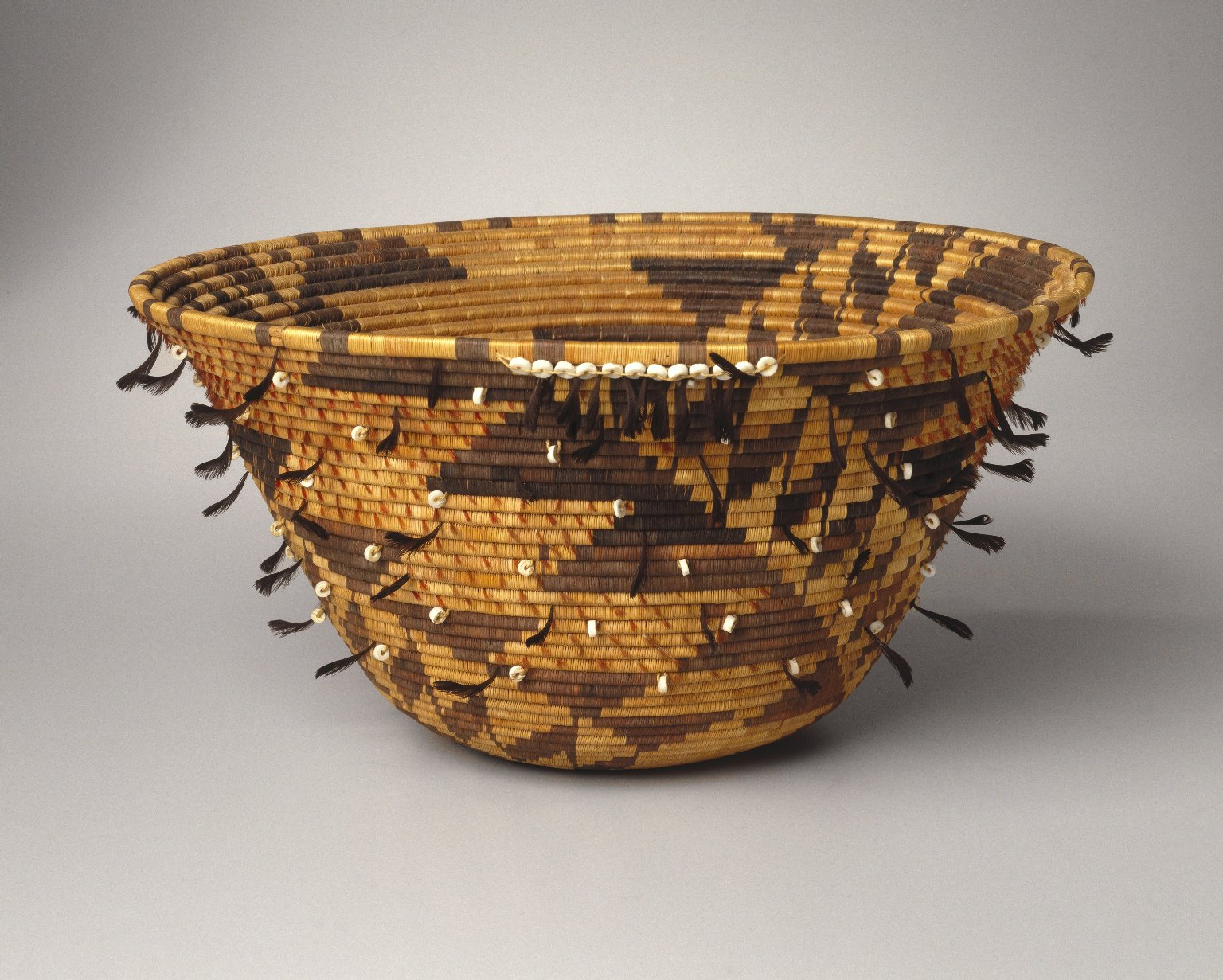
Pomo people girl's coiled dowry or puberty basket (kol-chu or ti-ri-bu-ku), late 19th century

Indigenous peoples of California and Great Basin are known for their basketry skills. Coiled baskets are particularly common, woven from sumac, yucca, willow, and basket rush. The works by Californian basket makers include many pieces in museums.

- Elsie Allen (Pomo people)
- Mary Knight Benson (Pomo people)
- William Ralganal Benson (Pomo people)
- Carrie Bethel (Mono Lake Paiute)
- Loren Bommelyn (Tolowa)
- Nellie Charlie (Mono Lake Paiute/Kucadikadi)
- Louisa Keyser "Dat So La Lee" (Washoe people) is arguably the most famous Native American weaver.
- Lena Frank Dick (1889–1965) (Washoe people) followed behind Keyser by one generation, and her baskets were frequently mistaken for Keyser's.
- L. Frank (Tongva-Acagchemem)
- Sarah Jim Mayo (Washoe)
- Mabel McKay (Pomo people)
- Essie Pinola Parrish (Kashaya-Pomo)
- Lucy Telles (Mono Lake Paiute - Kucadikadi)
- Petra Pico (Ventureño Chumash)

===== Southwestern =====
- Annie Antone (Tohono O'odham)
- Damian Jim (Navajo)
- Terrol Dew Johnson (Tohono O'odham)
- Mary Holiday Black (Diné)
- Sally Black (Diné)

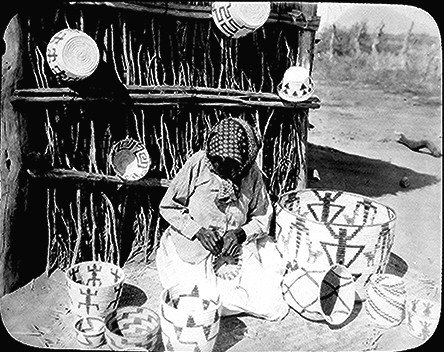
Traditional Tohono O'odham basketmaking, 1916

==== Native American basketry in Mexico ====
In northwestern Mexico, the Seri people continue to "sew" baskets using splints of the limberbush plant, Jatropha cuneata.

=== Europe ===
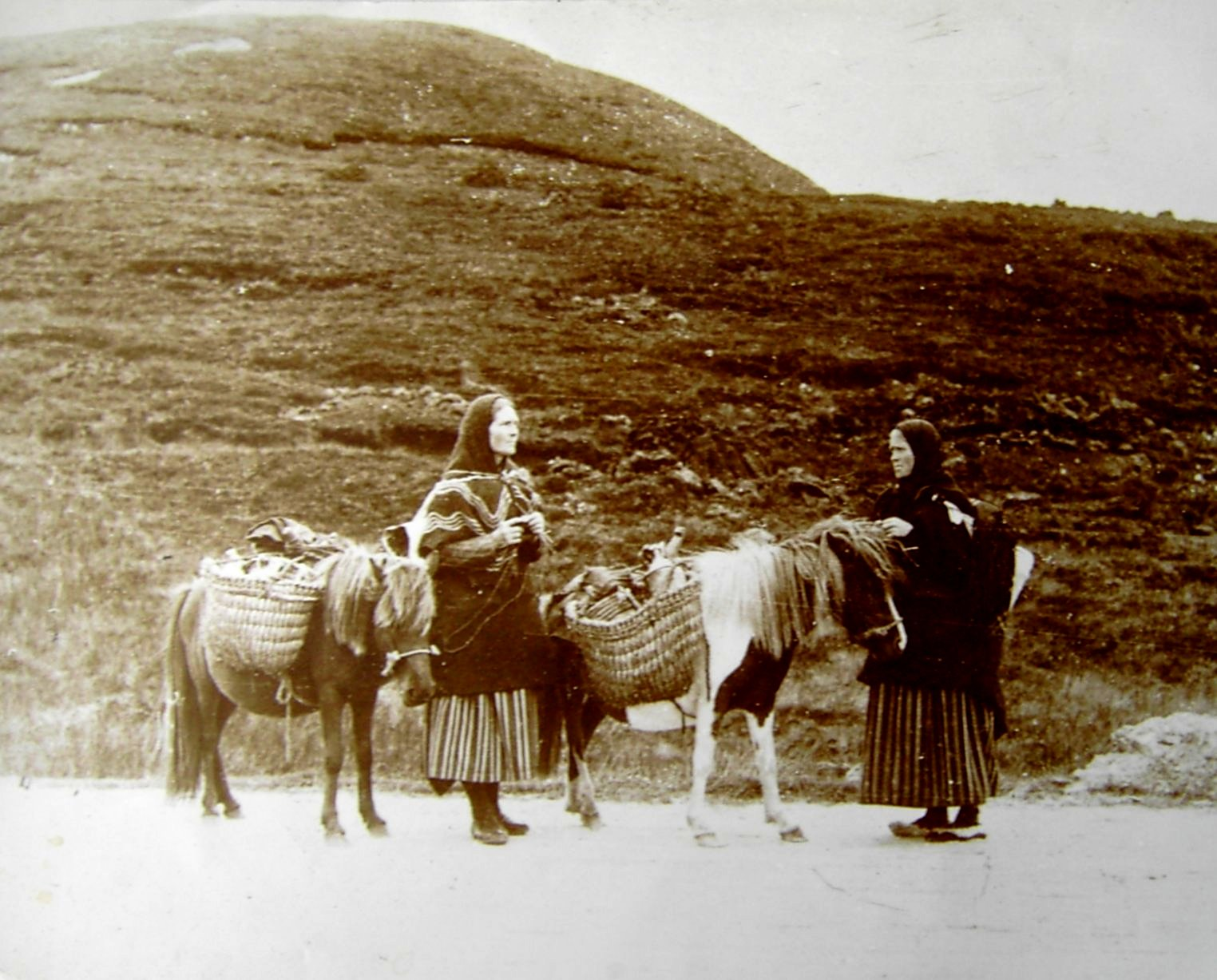
Two Shetland women carrying kishies, with ponies also carrying kishies.

In the Shetland Islands, Scotland, there is a tradition of kishie making. The Heritage Crafts Association classify kishie making as a critically endangered craft.

In Greece, basket weaving is practiced by the anchorite monks of Mount Athos.

In 2025, the basketry of Poland has been inscribed in the UNESCO Intangible Cultural Heritage List.

=== Africa ===
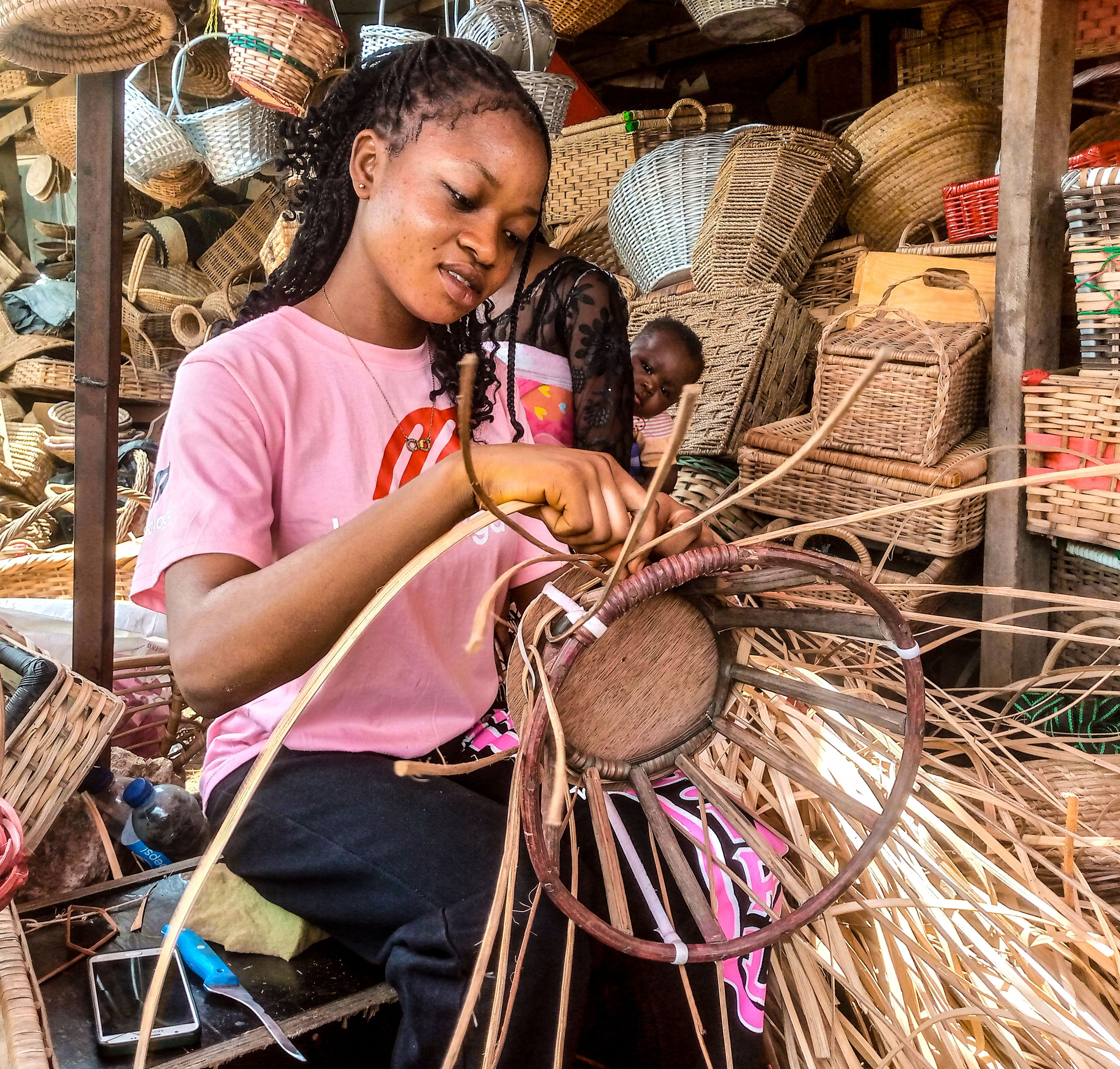
Woman weaving a basket in Lagos, Nigeria

==== Senegal ====
Wolof baskets are a coil basket created by the Wolof tribe of Senegal. These baskets is considered a women's craft, which have been passed across generations. The Wolof baskets were traditionally made by using thin cuts of palm frond and a thick grass called njodax; however contemporary Wolof baskets often incorporate plastic as a replacement for the palm fronds and/or re-use of discarded prayer mat materials. These baskets are strong and used for laundry hampers, planters, bowls, rugs, and more.

==== South Africa ====
Zulu baskets are a traditional craft in the KwaZulu-Natal province of South Africa and were used for utilitarian purposes including holding water, beer, or food; the baskets can take many months to weave. Starting in the late 1960s, Zulu basketry was a dying art form due to the introduction of tin and plastic water containers. Kjell Lofroth, a Swedish minister living in South Africa, noticed a decline in the local crafts, and after a drought in the KwaZulu-Natal province and he formed the Vukani Arts Association (English: wake up and get going) to financially support single women and their families. In this time period of the late 1960s, only three elderly women knew the craft of Zulu basket weaving but because of the Vukani Arts Association they taught others and revived the art. Beauty Ngxongo is the most renowned living Zulu basket weaver.

Zulu telephone wire baskets are a contemporary craft. These are often brightly colored baskets and made with telephone wire (sometimes from a recycled source), which is a substitute for native grasses.

== See also ==
- Native American basket weavers
- Amakan
- Basketry of Mexico
- Easter basket
- Elizabeth Hickox
- Fully feathered basket
- Kete (basket)
- Longaberger
- Neko chigura
- Pecos Classification
- Putcher
- Pasiking
- Sebucan
- Underwater basket weaving
- Willow Man
- Withy
