= Nellie Charlie =

Kucadikadi basket weaver from California

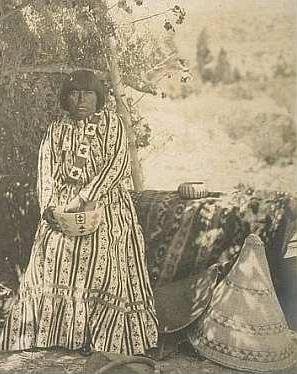
- Nellie Charlie in the early 20th century.
- Born: Besa-Yoona; 1867; Lee Vining, California, United States
- Died: 1965 (aged 97–98); Bishop, California, United States
- Education: Self-taught
- Known for: Basket weaving

Nellie Charlie (1867–1965) was a Mono Lake Paiute - Kucadikadi basketmaker associated with Yosemite National Park. She was born in Lee Vining, California, the daughter of tribal headman Pete Jim, and his wife Patsy, also a basket maker. She married Young Charlie, a Mono Lake Paiute - Kucadikadi man from Yosemite, and they had six children. Her Paiute name was Besa-Yoona.

== Personal life ==
Nellie Charlie was born in 1867 in Lee Vining, California. She was the daughter of tribal headman Pete Jim and his wife, Patsy, who was also a skilled basketmaker. She grew up within the Mono Lake Paiute-Kucadikadi community, where she learned the art of traditional basket weaving from her mother.

She married Young Charlie, a Mono Lake Paiute-Kucadikadi man from Yosemite, and the couple had six children. Her Paiute name was Besa-Yoona.

Charlie died in 1965 in Bishop, California, leaving behind a lasting influence on Native American basketry.

== Basket weaving and career ==
Charlie was known for her work in both traditional and modern basket styles. She actively participated in the annual Indian Field Days competition in Yosemite during the 1920s, showcasing her skill and creativity. She, along with other notable Paiute basketmakers such as Lucy Telles and Carrie Bethel, became known for producing visually stunning and complex polychrome baskets. Her daughter, Daisy Mallory, also became a prominent weaver, continuing the family's artistic legacy.

=== Legacy ===
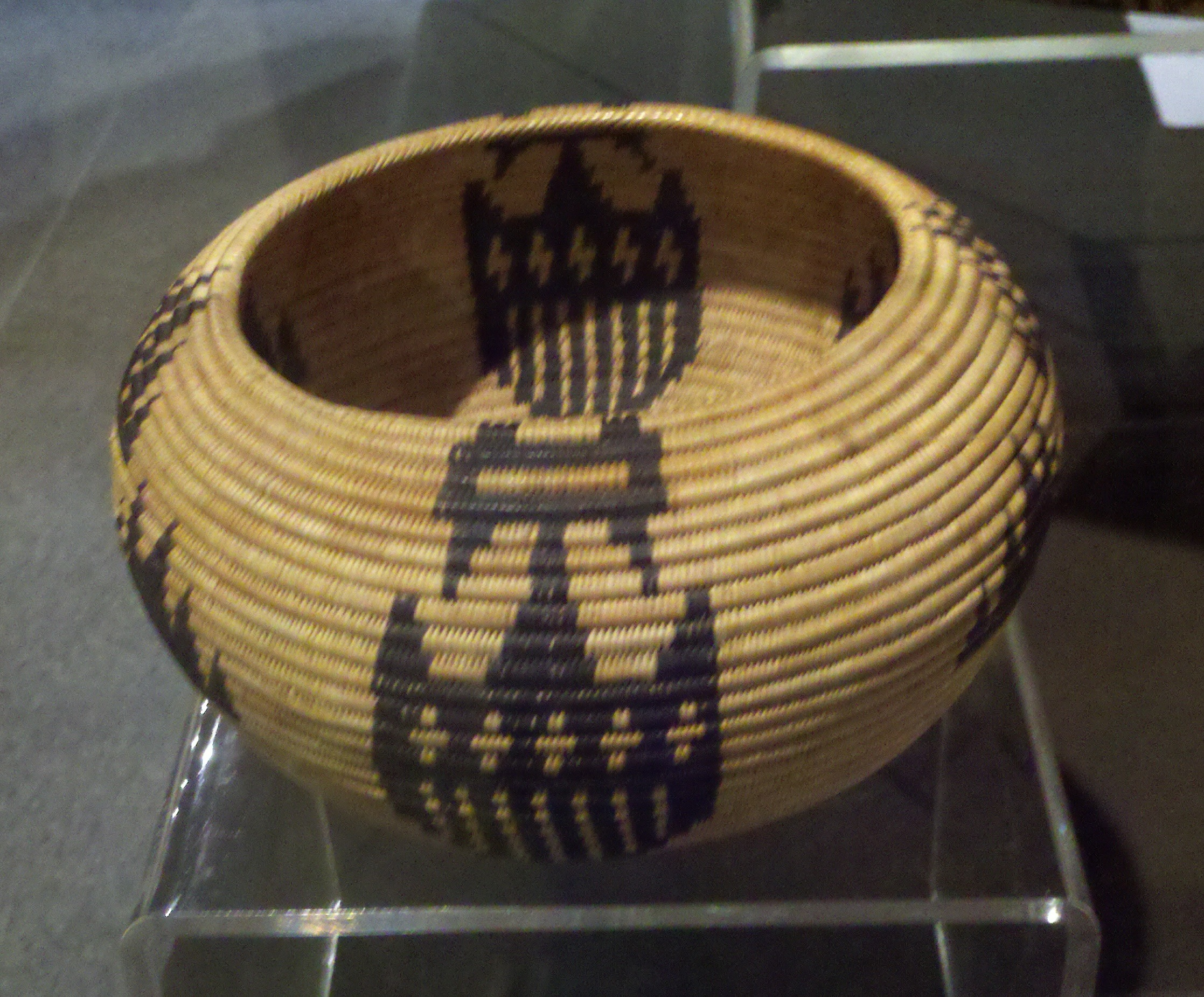
A 1924 basket by Nellie Charlie

One of her baskets covered with beadwork using Czechoslovak seed beads is in the collection of the Yosemite Museum. This and a more traditional basket she made of sedge root were part of an exhibition on the art of Yosemite which appeared at the Autry National Center, the Oakland Museum of California, the Nevada Museum of Art and the Eiteljorg Museum of American Indians and Western Art from 2006 to 2008.

She worked in both traditional and modern basket styles, and participated in the annual Indian Field Days competition in Yosemite in the 1920s. Her daughter, Daisy Mallory, became a prominent weaver.

She was among a group of Paiute women who "became known for their exceedingly fine, visually stunning and complex polychrome baskets." Others in this group included Lucy Telles and Carrie Bethel.

== See also ==
- List of Native American artists
- Visual arts by indigenous peoples of the Americas
