= Lucy Telles =

Mono Paiute-Miwok basket weaver from Mono Lake & Yosemite Valley, California

Lucy Park Telles
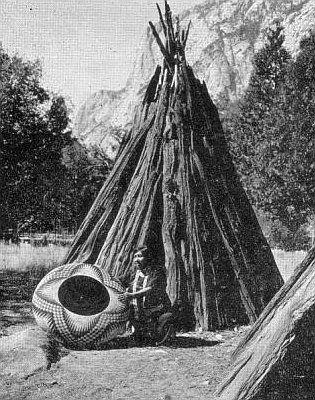
- Lucy Telles in Yosemite National Park, September 16, 1933
- Born: Pamahas c. 1870-1885; Mono County, California, United States
- Died: c. 1955-1956
- Education: Self-taught
- Known for: Basket weaving

Lucy Parker Telles (c. 1870/1885–1955/6) was a Mono Lake Paiute - Kucadikadi (Northern Paiute) and Southern Sierra Miwok (Yosemite Miwok) Native American basket weaver.

== Background ==
Lucy Telles was born near Mono Lake, in Mono County, California. Her native name was Pamahas, which translates to "Meadows" in the Northern Paiute language. Her parents were Louisa and Mack Tom. Her maternal grandparents were Mono Lake Paiute Captain Sam and Mono "Yosemite Paiute" Susie Sam. She and her family lived in Yosemite Valley and at Mono Lake. As a child, Telles played near Galen Clark's cabin. To supplement her family's income, she caught fish in the Valley to sell to hotel keepers.

Telles' first husband was Jack Parker, a Paiute. In 1902 they had a son, Lloyd Parker, but shortly after he was born, Jack died. She later married John Telles, a Mexican-American from Texas. John worked as a truck driver and laborer for the Yosemite Park & Curry Company, and the couple lived in Yosemite Valley.

Lucy Telles was one of a group of Mono-Paiute women that "became known for their exceedingly fine, visually stunning and complex polychrome baskets." Other basket weaving artists in this group included Nellie Charlie and Carrie Bethel.

== Art career ==
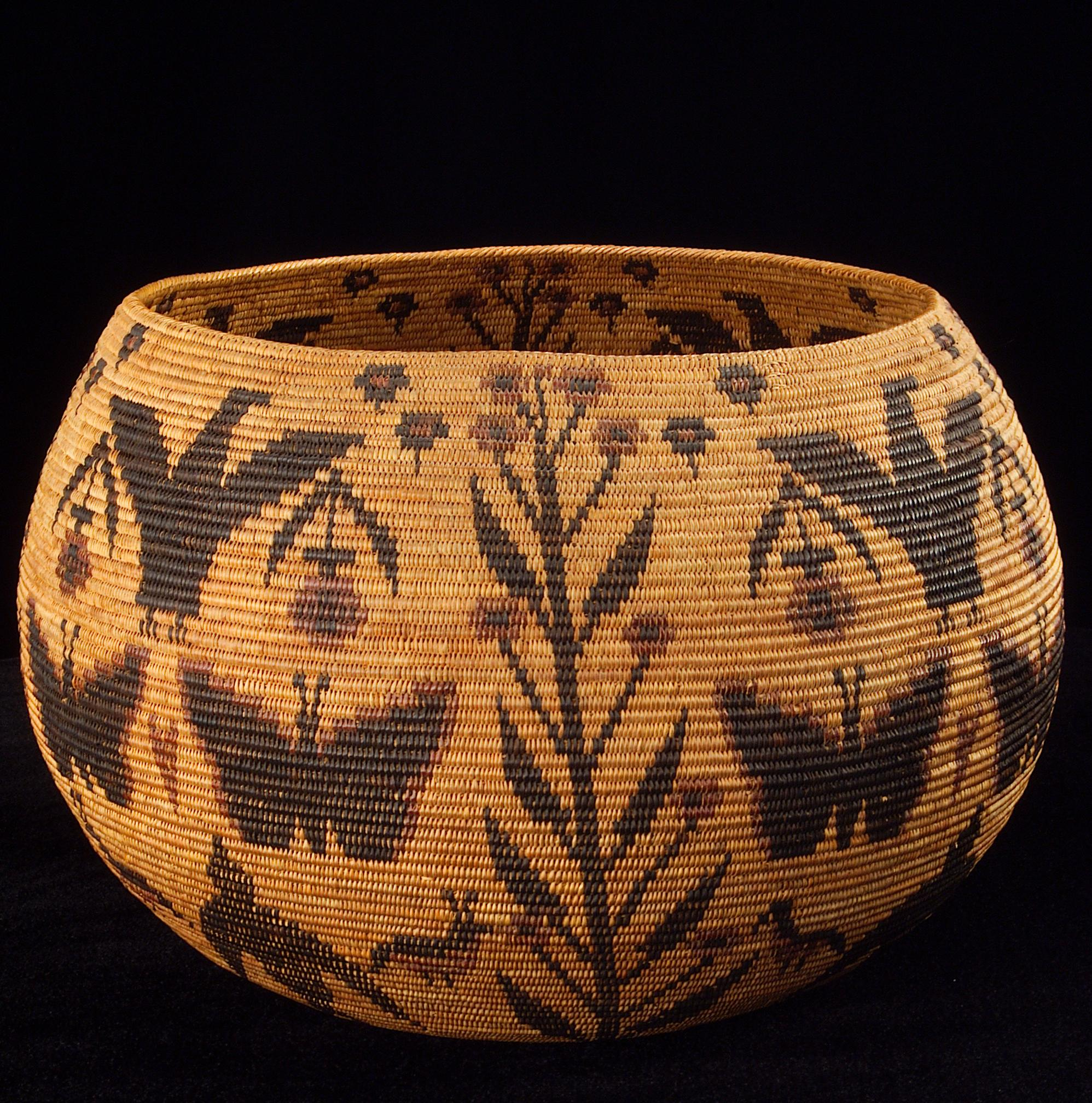
A woven basket made by Lucy Telles (National Museum of the American Indian)

Telles, who learned basket weaving as a child, was well known for her fine basketry during her lifetime. Her innovations in basket weaving had a lasting influence on Yosemite weavers. While traditional Miwok baskets had one color, she used two colors per basket. She created black from bracken fern root (Pteridium aquilinum) and red from split redbud twigs. She created new basketry designs, some inspired by Plains Indian geometric beadwork. Lucy sold her baskets to Yosemite visitors.

By the 1920s, Telles was regarded as the best basket weaver in Yosemite Valley. In 1924, she won a prize of $100 for her baskets. Her most famous basket was the largest known to have been woven in Yosemite Valley. It sold for $250 in 1939. An enormous basket with a 36" diameter that took her four years to weave took first prize at the 1933 World's Fair. In 1950, Telles raffled off this basket, her son won it, and the National Park Service purchased it for their Yosemite Museum.

Lucy demonstrated basket making to park visitors from 1930 until her death in 1955 or 1956. She taught her grandson's wife, Julia Peter Parker (Kashaya Pomo) how to weave baskets. She was one of the most prolific California and Yosemite – Mono Lake Paiute basket makers. Several of her baskets are featured at the Yosemite National Park Indian museum.

== Legacy ==
Two of her baskets were part of an exhibition on the art of Yosemite which appeared at the Autry National Center, the Oakland Museum of California, the Nevada Museum of Art and the Eiteljorg Museum of American Indians and Western Art from 2006 to 2008. One of her baskets from the collection of the California Academy of Sciences, is currently on exhibit at the California Museum in Sacramento.

== See also ==
- List of Native American artists
- Visual arts by indigenous peoples of the Americas
- Julia F. Parker
