= Halchita, Utah =

Halchita, Utah Halchíítah (Navajo)
- CDP
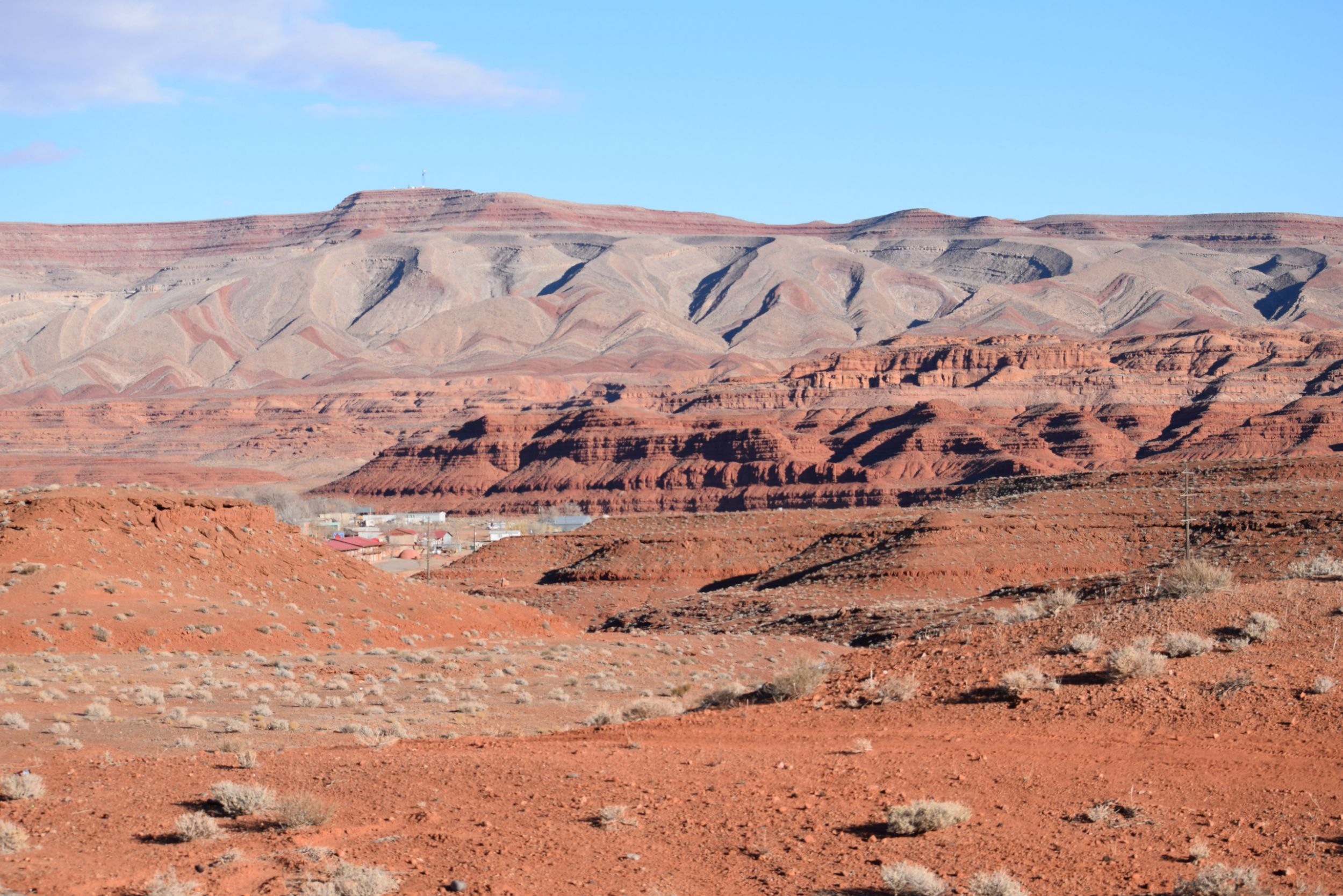

- Location in San Juan County and the state of Utah.
- Coordinates: 37°07′42″N 109°54′40″W
- Country: United States
- State: Utah
- County: San Juan

Area
  - Total: 17.1 sq mi (44.3 km^{2})
  - Land: 17.1 sq mi (44.3 km^{2})
  - Water: 0 sq mi (0.0 km^{2})
- Elevation: 4,774 ft (1,455 m)

Population (2020)
  - Total: 273
  - Density: 16.0/sq mi (6.16/km^{2})
- Time zone: UTC-7 (Mountain (MST))
  - Summer (DST): UTC-6 (MDT)
- FIPS code: 49-33002
- GNIS feature ID: 2408345

Halchita (Navajo: Halchíítah) is a census-designated place (CDP) in San Juan County, Utah, United States. The population was 273 at the 2020 census.

== Geography ==
According to the United States Census Bureau, the CDP has a total area of 17.1 square miles (44.3 km^{2}), of which 17.1 square miles (44.3 km^{2}) is land and 0.06% is water.

== Demographics ==
| Languages (2000) | Percent |
|---|---|
| Spoke Navajo at home | 81.82% |
| Spoke English at home | 18.18% |

As of the census of 2000, there were 270 people, 59 households, and 55 families residing in the CDP. The population density was 15.8 people per square mile (6.1/km^{2}). There were 86 housing units at an average density of 5.0/sq mi (1.9/km^{2}). The racial makeup of the CDP was 1.85% White and 98.15% Native American.

There were 59 households, out of which 62.7% had children under the age of 18 living with them, 59.3% were married couples living together, 32.2% had a female householder with no husband present, and 5.1% were non-families. 5.1% of all households were made up of individuals, and none had someone living alone who was 65 years of age or older. The average household size was 4.58 and the average family size was 4.73.

In the CDP, the population was spread out, with 45.2% under the age of 18, 11.9% from 18 to 24, 28.5% from 25 to 44, 11.9% from 45 to 64, and 2.6% who were 65 years of age or older. The median age was 20 years. For every 100 females, there were 88.8 males. For every 100 females age 18 and over, there were 78.3 males.

The median income for a household in the CDP was $9,875, and the median income for a family was $9,875. Males had a median income of $63,750 versus $0 for females. The per capita income for the CDP was $6,124. About 50.7% of families and 46.7% of the population were below the poverty line, including 48.3% of those under the age of eighteen and 100.0% of those 65 or over.

== Notable residents ==
- Mary Holiday Black (Navajo, ca. 1934–2022), basket maker, textile weaver

== See also ==
- List of census-designated places in Utah
