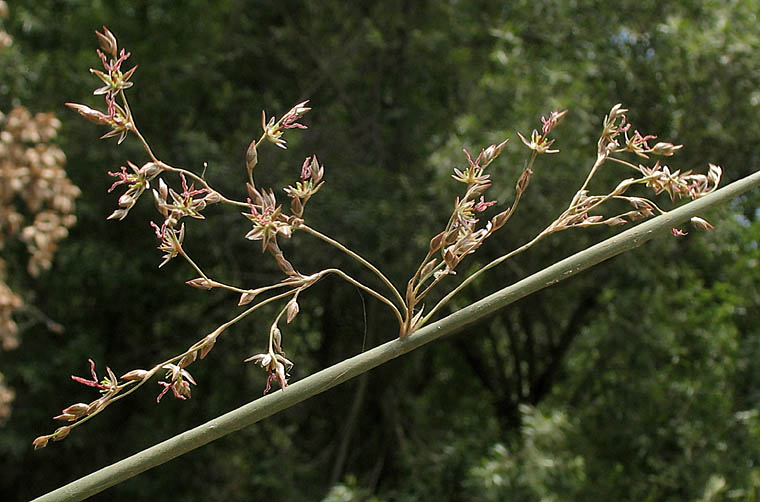

Scientific classification
- Kingdom: Plantae
- Clade: Tracheophytes
- Clade: Angiosperms
- Clade: Monocots
- Clade: Commelinids
- Order: Poales
- Family: Juncaceae
- Genus: Juncus
- Species: J. textilis

Binomial name
- Juncus textilis Buchenau

= Juncus textilis =

Species of grass

Juncus textilis is a species of rush known by the common name basket rush. It is endemic to California, where it grows along the coast and in the coastal mountain ranges of the southern half of the state.

== Description ==
Juncus textilis is a rhizomatous perennial herb growing to a maximum height between 1 and 2 metres (3.3 and 6.6 ft). The stems are cylindrical with faint longitudinal grooves. The leaves lack blades and appear as small brown sheaths around the base of the stems.

The long, bushy inflorescence arises from the side of the stem and splits into long branches bearing clusters of many flowers. Each flower is cupped by small, clear bractlets and has pointed greenish brown tepals. There are six stamens with large anthers. The fruit is a dark brown, shiny capsule.

== Uses ==
This species of rush has been used historically for basket weaving by several Native American peoples of southern California, such as the Cahuilla, Kumeyaay, and Chumash, among others.

Juncus textilis is an important plant endemic to California; Chumash people use it today for basket-making as they have for centuries.

The rush was [sic] valued for its varied colors, from deep red to sun-dried tan; the stems were [sic] dyed black with sea plants such as Suaeda species and yellow with Psorothamnus emoryi.

The tassels atop the rushes can be shaken for seeds, which can be eaten like grains. In springtime, the tender white bases can be eaten as emergency rations.
