= Mary Holiday Black =

Navajo basket maker (c. 1934–2022)

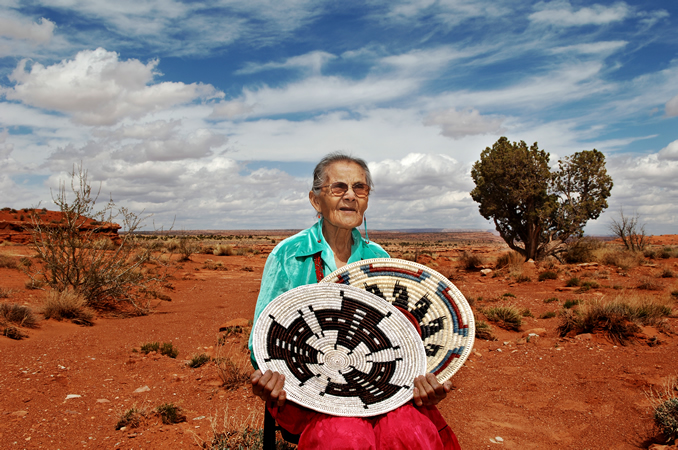
- Black with two of her baskets in 1995
- Born: Mary Holiday c. 1934; Monument Valley, Utah, U.S.
- Died: December 13, 2022
- Resting place: Monument Valley Community Cemetery
- Citizenship: Navajo Nation and American
- Style: Navajo weaving, coiled basketry
- Spouse: Jessie Black (1950s–1994)
- Children: 11, including Sally Black
- Awards: National Heritage Fellowship (1995)

Mary Holiday Black (c. 1934 – December 13, 2022) was a Navajo basket maker and textile weaver from Halchita, Utah. During the 1970s, in response to a long-term decline in Navajo basketry, Black played a key role in the revival of Navajo basket weaving by experimenting with new designs and techniques, pioneering a new style of Navajo baskets known as "story baskets."

In 1995, Black became the first Navajo artist and the first artist from Utah to receive a National Heritage Fellowship from the National Endowment for the Arts. Her baskets have been featured in collections and exhibitions throughout Utah.

== Early and personal life ==
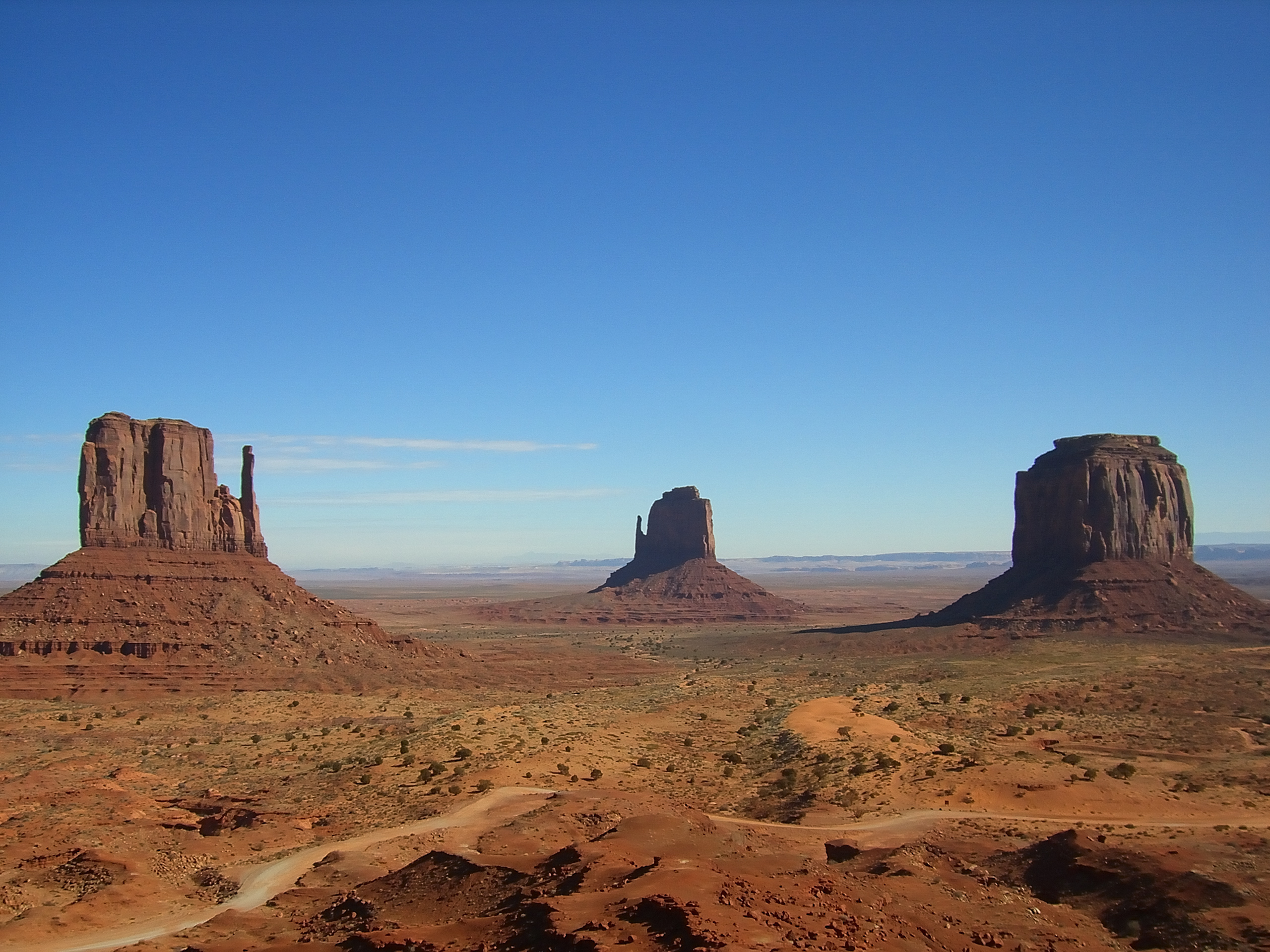
Monument Valley, Utah

Mary Holiday was born around 1934 to Teddy and Betty Holiday in Monument Valley, Utah. She had six siblings, and as the eldest daughter she was expected to stay home and take care of the household. She never attended school. When Black was 11 years old, she learned basket weaving from a relative of her grandmother.

In the 1950s, she married Jessie Black, and the couple eventually had 11 children. Jessie died in 1994. Black passed on her weaving skills to nine of her children, and several of her children have gone on to become respected basket makers, including Jamison Black and Sally Black.

Black only spoke the Navajo language and never learned English. She used an interpreter when necessary.

== Role in basket weaving revival ==
During the first half of the 20th century, fewer Navajos wove baskets. Rug weaving had become a better source of income for women than basket weaving, and only a handful of Navajo basket makers were left by the 1960s. For ceremonies, they imported baskets from the nearby Ute and Paiute people.

Although traditional Navajo basket weaving made use of strips of sumac bark, in the 1970s, Black contributed to a revival of Navajo basket weaving, experimenting with new designs and techniques. Her innovations included expanding the size of ceremonials baskets, using vegetable dyes to create more subtle colors, incorporating motifs from ancient Southwestern Indigenous pottery and rock art, and using Navajo religious imagery to weave visual narratives into her baskets. Black became known as a pioneer of Navajo "story baskets", weaving themes such as "Placing the Stars" and "Changing Bear Woman" that were inspired by Navajo oral history. Although some Navajo community members were initially skeptical of the way Black was altering long-held basket making practices, her work gained acceptance over time.

In 1993, Black received the Utah Governor's Award for the Arts. In 1995, Black was awarded a National Heritage Fellowship by the National Endowment for the Arts. She was the first artist from Utah and the first Navajo artist to receive the honor. Black has been called "the matriarch of Navajo basketry".

In 2006, Black participated in the Smithsonian Folklife Festival. In January 2013, baskets by the Black family were featured as part of "Weaving a Revolution: A Celebration of Contemporary Navajo Baskets", the first major museum exhibit on Navajo basket weaving. Black's work has appeared at the Natural History Museum of Utah, Utah State University Eastern, the Indian Museum of Lake County, and the Utah State Folk Arts Collection.

== Death ==
Black died on December 13, 2022.
