= Sally Black =

Diné (Navajo) basket weaver

Sally Black (born 1959, or 1962) is a Diné (Navajo) basketry artist. She lives in Monument Valley, and is an enrolled member of the Navajo Nation.

== Early life ==
Sally Black was born in either 1959, or 1962. She is the daughter of the weaver and basketry artist, Mary Holiday Black. She was brought up on the Douglas Mesa in southeastern Utah. When she was eight years old she began weaving baskets, having learned the skills from her mother and grandmother. At age 15 she sold her first basket; it was bought by the Heard Museum in Phoenix.

== Work ==
Sumac is the primary fiber she works with in both her pictorial and traditional baskets. She gathers the sumac from areas around the Green River and Hanksville, Utah. She then splits the fiber by hand, and dyes it. She spends most of the winter months for the actual weaving. In the 1970s she broke with tradition and began incorporating imagery into her basket designs including hummingbirds and eagles. Black has received honors and awards for her work, including a National Endowment for the Arts national heritage award. Other honors include Best in Show awards from the Museum of Northern Arizona. In 1975, she started using Navajo rug designs in her baskets. Later she incorporated Yei-Be-Chai figures, eagles, turtles, dear, horses and dogs. Black has stated that her designs are also influenced by the Tohono O'odham and the Apache peoples.

== Collections ==
Her work is included in the permanent collections of the Natural History Museum of Utah, the Nelson Atkins Museum of Art, the Heard Museum, and the National Museum of the American Indian, among other venues.

== Personal life ==
In 2021, Black's home in Monument Valley burned to the ground. Her belongings, including all of her weaving supplies, unfinished commissioned baskets and traditional clothing were destroyed. Her partner, Ryan Thompson, who was in the house at the time, perished in the fire.
