= Elizabeth Hickox =

Wiyot basket maker form California (1870s–1947)

Elizabeth Conrad Hickox
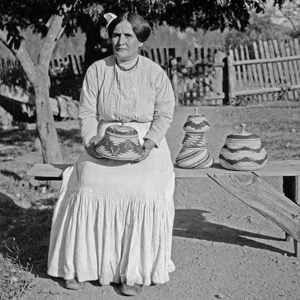
- Born: ca. 1872/1875; Karuk Territory, California
- Died: July 19, 1947; California
- Citizenship: Wiyot Tribe
- Known for: Native American basketry
- Spouse(s): Frank Merrill, Luther Hickox
- Patrons: Grace Nicholson

Elizabeth Conrad Hickox (1872/5–July 19, 1947) was a Wiyot master basket weaver and was considered one of the finest basket-weavers of her time. Her baskets differ from other Lower Klamath baskets through her own unique use of shape, technique, color scheme and design.

== Early life ==
Elizbeth Conrad Hickox's birth year has been given as 1872 and 1875. Hickox's mother was Wiyot and her father, European-American. It was reported that Hickox's mother, Polly, had been abducted by her later husband, Charles Conrad. When Elizabeth was in her teens, she married Frank Merrill (Karuk), and they had two children together, Jessie and Bruce. She later married Luther Hickox in 1895. Luther Hickox owned a gold mine, was a part owner of a sawmill and later became a justice of the peace. The couple enjoyed a high social status among the Karuk people, as well as financial security.

Hickox lived along the Salmon River in Northern California.

== Artwork ==
Hickox used various materials to weave her baskets including grape root twining, white bear grass (Xerophyllum tenax), dyed Woodwardia fern, black maidenhair fern and dyed porcupine quills. She tended to use the fern Adiantum aleuticum, a dark material in contrast to the porcupine quills dyed yellow with Letharia vulpina. The choice to mostly use dark materials contrasted with the yellow was her own choice, and not subject to marketplace demands. Between 1911 and 1934, she made about five baskets a year.

Hickox and her daughter, Louise, weaved and sold their baskets to Grace Nicholson, who continued to buy their work even during the Great Depression. Though Hickox was Wiyot, Nicholson marketed her baskets as "Karuk" because they lived in the Karuk area. Before Hickox met Nicholson, she had already chosen to create fine-art baskets. After Nicholson stopped purchasing baskets in 1934, Hickox continued to weave "for pleasure, utility and gift-giving."

In 2020, the art of Hickox was exhibited in the exhibition Hearts of Our People: Native Women Artists at the Smithsonian American Art Museum.

== Death ==
Hickox died on July 19, 1947.

== Public collections ==
Elizabeth Hickox's baskets can be found in numerous public collections, including the following:

- Autry Museum of the American West (Southwest Museum of Los Angeles)
- Denver Art Museum
- Field Museum of Natural History
- National Museum of the American Indian, Smithsonian Institution the Lauren Rogers Museum of Art,
- Natural History Museum of Los Angeles County.
- Peabody Museum of Archaeology and Ethnology at Harvard University
- University of Pennsylvania Museum of Archaeology and Anthropology
