= Ansel Franklin Hall =

American naturalist

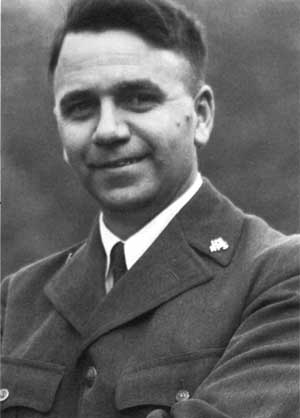
Ansel F. Hall

Ansel F. Hall (May 6, 1894 in Oakland, California – March 28, 1962) was an American naturalist. He was the first chief naturalist and first chief forester of the United States National Park Service.

== Early career ==
Hall was graduated in 1917 from the University of California with a degree in forestry. He joined the then-infant National Park Service as a ranger in Sequoia National Park. His Park Service career was then interrupted by military service in France during World War I.

From 1920 to 1923, Hall served as the first park naturalist of Yosemite National Park, where he established innovative interpretative programs, founded the Yosemite Museum Association, made geological models and native crafts, mounted natural history specimens, and edited the seminal Handbook of Yosemite National Park, published in 1921.

== National service ==
Hall's energy and competence attracted attention in Washington and he was promoted to serve in the following posts:

- 1923–1930: Chief Naturalist of the National Park Service.
- 1923–1933: Chief Forester and Senior Naturalist of the National Park Service.
- 1933–1937: Chief of the National Park Service Field Division.

In 1930, Hall co-wrote (with Frederick Law Olmsted's sons) a report for an Oakland, California, foundation which "...advocated a revolutionary new concept: a regional approach to park development, the creation of truly large, interconnected parklands that would define an urban landscape...", and which led directly to the establishment of the East Bay Regional Park District in the Oakland area

In 1933–1934, Hall led an expedition to the Rainbow Bridge - Monument Valley area, which produced thousands of valuable photographs of Indian life in the Four Corners area of that time.

Hall left the Park Service in 1938 to operate concessions in Mesa Verde National Park. Later he worked as a consultant in park design and interpretation and wrote books on the topic.

== Publications ==
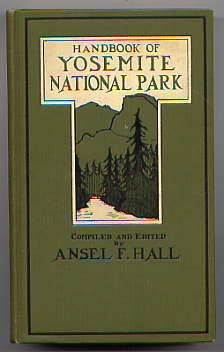
Hall's classic 1921 Yosemite Handbook

Hall, Ansel Franklin. Guide to Yosemite: A handbook of the trails and roads of Yosemite valley and the adjacent region (Sunset Publishing House, 1920)

Hall, Ansel Franklin. Guide to Giant Forest, Sequoia National Park: A handbook of the northern section of Sequoia National Park and the adjacent Sierra Nevada (Hall, 1921)

Hall, Ansel Franklin, editor. Handbook of Yosemite National Park: a compendium of articles on the Yosemite region by the leading scientific authorities (New York: G.P. Putnam’s Sons, 1921) LCCN 21014069. Library of Congress Call No. F 868.Y6 H18.

Hall, Ansel Franklin. "Mount Shasta" in Sierra Club Bulletin. 1926. Vol. 12. No. 3. pp. 250–67. Publications of the Sierra Club.

Hall, Ansel Franklin. Yosemite Valley: An intimate guide (National Parks Publishing House, 1929)

Olmsted Brothers and Ansel F. Hall. Report on proposed park reservations for East Bay cities, California / prepared by Olmsted Brothers and Ansel F. Hall, in consultation with the East Bay Regional Park Association; for the Bureau of Public Administration, University of California (1930)

Hall, Ansel Franklin. A Guide to Sequoia and General Grant National Parks (National Parks Publishing House, 1930)

Hall, Ansel Franklin. General report on the Rainbow Bridge-Monument Valley Expedition of 1933 (University of California Press, 1934)

Hall, Ansel Franklin. A pictorial guide to Mesa Verde National Park (Smith-Brooks, 1951; Mesa Verde Company, 1960)

Hall, Ansel Franklin. Mesa Verde, a brief guide (publishing details unknown)

Turner, Jack, author, and Hall, Ansel F, photographer. Early Images of the Southwest: The Lantern Slides of Ansel F. Hall (Roberts Rinehart Publishers, 1998). ISBN 1-57098-217-1

Turner, Jack, author, and Hall, Ansel F, photographer. Landscapes On Glass: Lantern Slides For The Rainbow Bridge - Monument Valley Expedition With a foreword by President Bill Clinton. (Durango Herald Small Press, 2010). 978-1-887805-31-5
