= Petra Pico =

Ventureño Chumash basket weaver

Petra Pico (c. April 29, 1834 – September 7, 1902) was a Chumash basket weaver, elder, and regarded as a figurehead of the Ventureño Chumash Community. She was born at Mission San Buenaventura in 1834 to two Chumash neophytes. Her parents were also born and raised at the Mission and had ties to villages throughout modern-day Ventura County, near Santa Paula and Ojai.

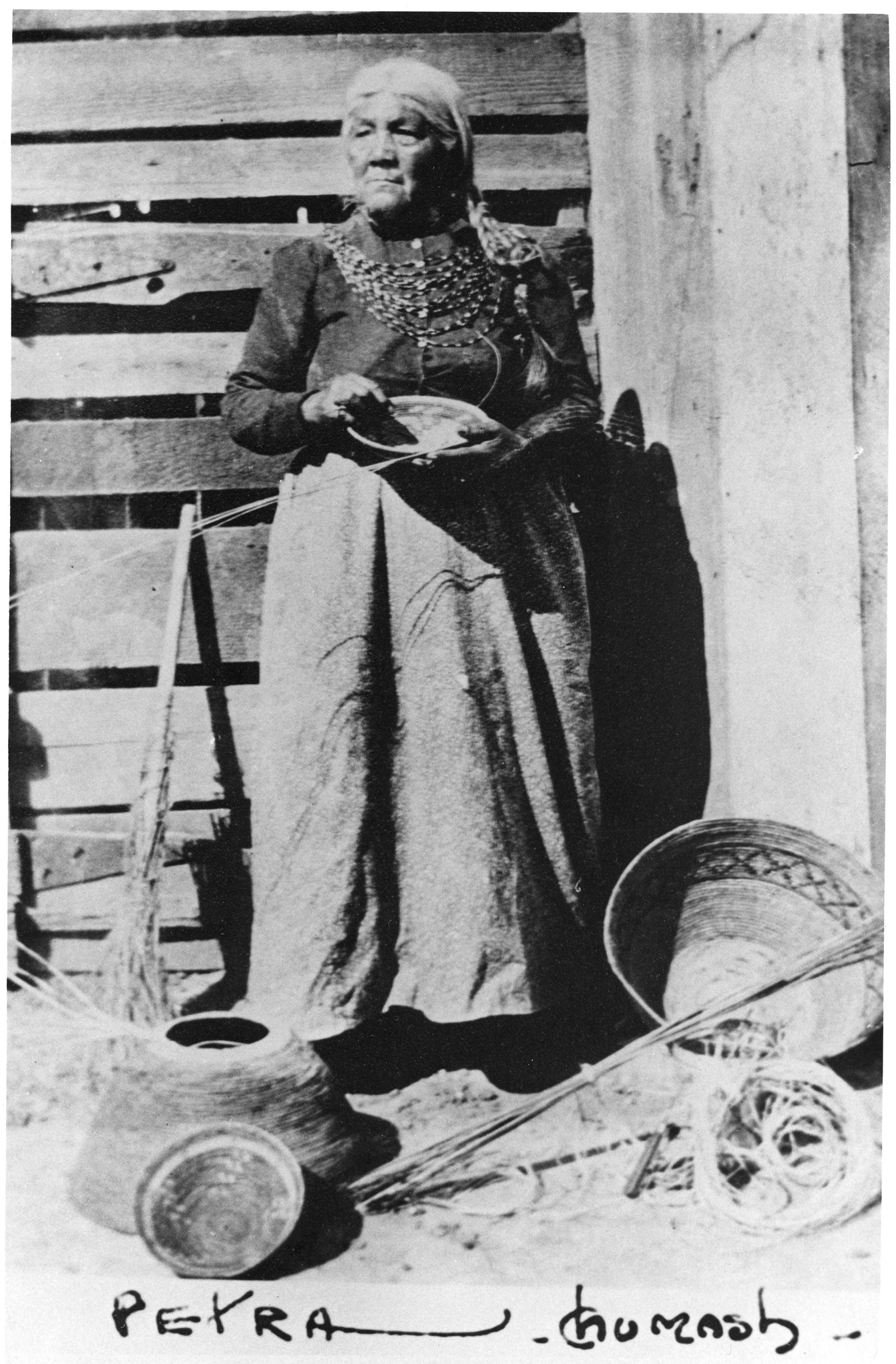
Petra Pico, standing against a wall carrying an unfinished woven basket.

== Early life ==
According to Mission records, Pico was born on April 29, 1834, the fifth child to Chumash neophytes named Ysidra Maria Sutipeylelene and Penèw Peregrino Papumiahuit.

Pico's mother Ysidra was born at the same mission to parents from Somǝs and Kayǝwǝš and later served as a consultant to Alphonse Pinart, a French anthropologist and linguist studying the Chumash dialect of Ventura. Her father Penèw was born to Chumash parents from Lalimanux and Somǝs and served as a school teacher and choir singer at the Mission.

There are no records showing exactly how she learned to weave baskets, however she likely learned from her mother or an elder within the tribe.

== Family & Marriages ==
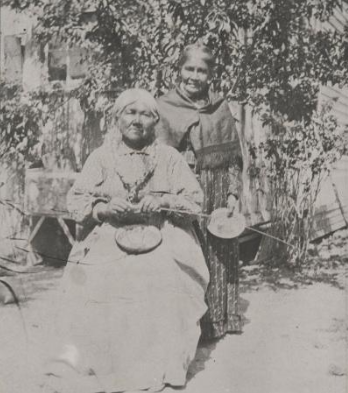
Petra Pico weaves a basket while sitting next to Donaciana Salazar, her sister-in-law and fellow basket weaver.

Pico married three times; first, to a Chumash man named Conrado Quilo in 1849, when she was 15 years old. She had two children by Conrado, but only the eldest daughter, Manuela, survived through infancy. Conrado died, and in 1866, she married Lucas Garcia of Santa Barbara. After Lucas' passing, she married a prevalent Chumash man named Simplicio Pico, from whom she got her last name. Petra and Simplicio lived in what is now the western end of downtown Ventura. When her eldest daughter died in 1877, she began raising her granddaughters, Juana Pascuala and Juana Delfina, in her home with Simplicio.

Through her first marriage to Conrado, she became the sister-in-law of another prominent basket weaver, Donaciana Salazar, who was married to Conrado's brother Norberto Skit'ima.

Her eldest granddaughter, Juana Pascuala, married Luis García in 1884. The following year, they settled in town and had their first child, Alberto Luis García. Pascuala passed away in the fall of 1909 and is buried at Santa Clara Cemetery in Oxnard, California.

== Basketry ==
Pico's basket weaving was regarded as a "new mode" by Fernando "Kitsepawit" Librado. She was said to have left her juncus to dry for at least 15 days. She collected toku, better known as Urtica dioica, at Foster park.

In the late 19th century, Pico and her friends were prominent throughout the Santa Barbara Channel region. Their baskets were eagerly bought and collected by early Spanish settlers, to the point of entire towns selling out, causing complaints from travelers to the area.

Pico's baskets are now displayed across the United States. Her final basket before losing her eyesight was named "Queen Isabella's Crown," which is now held at the Smithsonian National Museum of Natural History.

== Later life ==
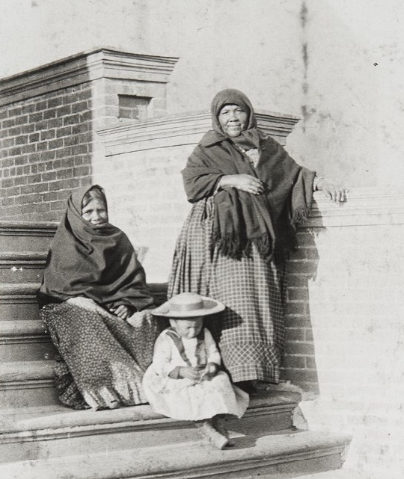
Petra Pico standing and Apolonia Guzman sitting at the Mission San Buenaventura steps. The little girl is Petra's great-granddaughter, Soraida García.

According to the Museum of Ventura County, she worked as a washerwoman for Anglo and Spanish-American families in downtown Ventura. As she grew older, she lived with her granddaughter Juana Pascuala García, her grandson-in-law, and great-grandchildren in El Rio, California.

Pico fell sick in 1901 and the Ventura Free Press on November 22, 1901, reported: "Petra, positively the last of the celebrated pure-Indian basket makers, lies very ill at the home of her great grandchild, Mrs. Garcia, whom she was visiting in El Rio. Petra is about 90 years old. She owns a little home on Spruce Street not far from the courthouse in this city. Petra remembers well the early history of Ventura." However this quote is inaccurate, as Pico would have been around sixty-seven years old in 1901.

== Legacy ==
Pico's life and work are now celebrated throughout Southern California by her descendants and those studying the lives of Indigenous Californians in the 19th century. A tribute to Pico stands at the Working Artists of Ventura, where her and her husband Simplicio Pico once resided.
