= Carrie Bethel =

Mono Lake Paiute – Kucadikad basketmaker (1898–1974)

- Carrie Bethel c. 1929
- Born: Carrie McGowan Bethel; July 4, 1898; Lee Vining, California
- Died: February 24, 1974 (aged 75); Lee Vining, California
- Known for: Basket weaving
- Spouse: Harry Bethel
- Awards: 1926 Yosemite Field Days competition

Carrie McGowan Bethel (July 4, 1898–February 24, 1974) was a Mono Lake Paiute – Kucadikadi (Northern Paiute) basketmaker associated with Yosemite National Park. She was born Carrie McGowan in Lee Vining, California on July 4, 1898, and began making baskets at age twelve. She participated in basket-making competitions in the Yosemite Indian Field Days in 1926 and 1929, and June Lake. She gave basket weaving demonstrations at the 1939 Golden Gate International Exposition, as a cultural demonstrator for the Indian Exhibition.

She worked several different jobs throughout her life, including making food for road crews and working as a laundress in Tioga Lodge in order to supplement the income given from selling her baskets at trading posts near San Francisco.

Bethel was one of a group of Mono-Paiute women who "became known for their exceedingly fine, visually stunning and complex polychrome baskets." Other basket weaving artists in this group included Nellie Charlie and Lucy Telles. Her sister, Minnie Mike, was also a basket weaver.

Bethel died in Lee Vining, California on February 24, 1974.

== Legacy ==
In 2006, one of her baskets sold at auction for $216,250. This basket had won first prize in the 1926 Yosemite Field Days basket competition.

Basket collector James Schwabacher bought some of her larger baskets. Four of her baskets were part of an exhibition on the art of Yosemite which appeared at the Autry National Center, the Oakland Museum of California, the Nevada Museum of Art, and the Eiteljorg Museum of American Indians and Western Art from 2006 to 2008.

== Gallery ==
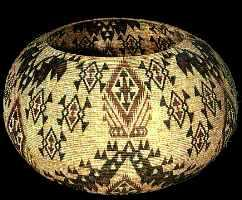
Carrie Bethel made this 30" diameter basket from 1931–1935

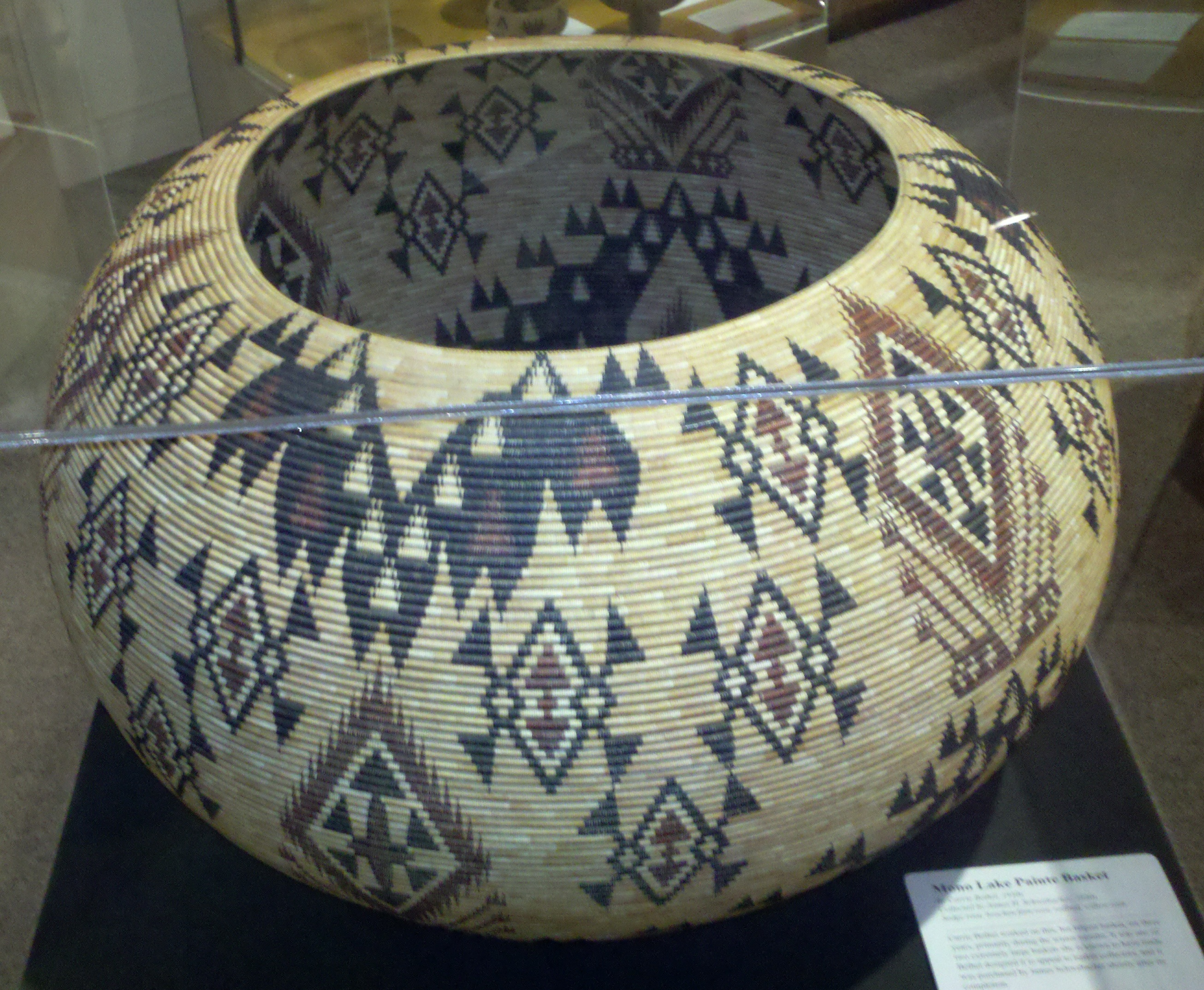
Basket made by Carrie Bethel in the early 1930s

== See also ==
- List of Native American artists
- Visual arts by indigenous peoples of the Americas
