= Kucadikadi =

Kucadɨkadɨ
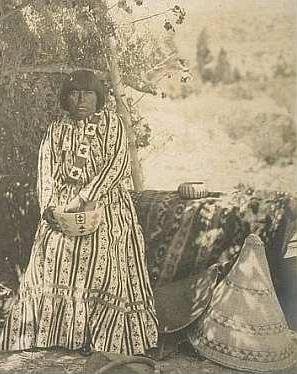
- Nellie Charlie, a member of the Kucadikadi band, early 20th century

Regions with significant populations
- United States ( California)

Languages
- Northern Paiute language, English language

Religion
- Traditional tribal religion, Shamanism

Related ethnic groups
- other Northern Paiute people, Mono tribe (including Owens Valley Paiute), Western Shoshone, Yokuts

The Kucadɨkadɨ are a band of Eastern Mono Northern Paiute people who live near Mono Lake in Mono County, California. They are the southernmost band of Northern Paiute.

== Name ==
Kucadɨkadɨ means "eaters of the brine fly pupae". They are also known as the Kutsavidökadö, Koza'bittukut'teh, Kotsa'va, Mono Lake Paiute, Mono Basin Paiute, and Kuzedika, while the tribe itself calls themselves Kootzaduka’a. The term "Mono Lake Paiute," a holdover from early anthropological literature, has proven problematic. The term "Mono" is from a Yokutsan loanword from the tribe's southwestern neighbors, the Yokuts, who designated the band living around Mono Lake as monachie/monoache ("fly people") because fly larvae were their chief food staple and trading article. Later researchers believed this term referred to both the Kucadɨkadɨ and their southern Mono neighbors who now bear this name. Most confusingly, while Mono stuck to the unrelated people to the south, it also correctly stuck to the lake around which the Kucad~~i~~kad~~i~~ live. Lamb gives the Mono language name as kwicathyhka', "larvae eaters", or Mono Lake Paviotso.

The Yosemite-Mono Lake Paiute group trace the origins of the Ahwahnichi, the original inhabitants of the park, to Chief Tenaya's group, which is the band documented in Bunnell's accounts. Andrews said that Tenaya led a band of Paiutes that migrated from the Mono Lake area and settled in villages in Yosemite.

== Culture and geography ==
The Kucadɨkadɨ's homeland surrounds Mono Lake in eastern California, but they traditionally traveled to Walker Lake, Nevada for seasonal subsistence activities. Mono Lake is a high piedmont area of the Sierra Nevada, the average elevation in the Mono Lake basin is around 6,400 feet (2,000 m) above sea level. The surrounding mountains range from 9,000 to 13,000 ft (2,700 to 4,000 m) in elevation. Mono Lake is extremely saline and is home to several waterfowl species and the brine fly, or Ephydra hians or Hydropyrus hians, from which the band takes its name. Pinus monophylla or piñon pine has been an important source of food, as were jackrabbits, deer, mountain sheep, and the coloradia Pandora moth.

The extended family formed the band's basic social units, which moved together as a group. They traded with Owens Valley Paiute and Western Mono.

Three late 19th-century winter houses belonging to the tribe have been excavated by archaeologists. They are conical houses constructed with posts of Utah juniper or Juniperus osteosperma. Winter houses of this type, called tomogani, were built by the band up to 1920.

== Language ==
The Kucadɨkadɨ speak the Northern Paiute language, which is in the Numic branch of the Uto-Aztecan language family. The Numu (Northern Paiute) language is spoken by a wide number of different tribes, residing across the western United States, from Mono Lake in eastern California, and extending into Nevada, Oregon, and Idaho. Extending further in the United States of America, the Northern Paiute language is connected to the language of the Shoshoni, who live in Death Valley, and east and north California, as well as that of the Kawaiisu and Ute people, who live in southern California, Nevada, Utah, and Arizona.

== Basketry ==
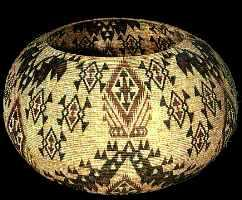
Fine coiled basket made by Carrie Bethel, 30" diameter basket, 1931–1935

The band is well known for its basketry, they wove coiled baskets as well as twined baskets. Bracken fern and redbud provide color for designs on coiled baskets.

In the late 19th and early 20th centuries, encroachment of non-Natives in their territory disrupted traditional hunting and gathering lifestyles, so members of the tribe relied on the tourist trade. Selling elaborate baskets to non-Indian tourists became a viable way of making a living.

Glass beads were introduced by non-natives, and Kucadɨkadɨ women began incorporating the seed beads into their baskets by 1908.

== Today ==
Many members of the Kucadɨkadɨ band are enrolled in federally recognized Bishop Paiute, Washoe, Yokut, Miwok, and Western Mono tribes. Others are seeking recognition as the Sierra Southern Miwuk and the Mono Lake Indian Community, headquartered in Lee Vining, California.

== Notable Kucad~~i~~kad~~i~~ ==
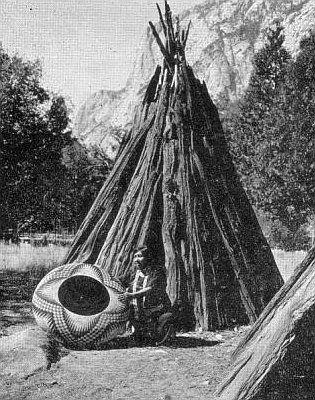
Lucy Telles in front of her tomogani with her largest basket, Yosemite National Park, 1933

- Carrie Bethel (1898–1974), basket weaver
- Nellie Charlie (1867–1965), basket weaver
- Tina Charlie (1869–1962), basket weaver
- Lucy Telles (ca. 1870/1885–1955/6), basket weaver
