= Yosemite Museum =

Museum in California

Coordinates: 37.7486°N 119.5880°W

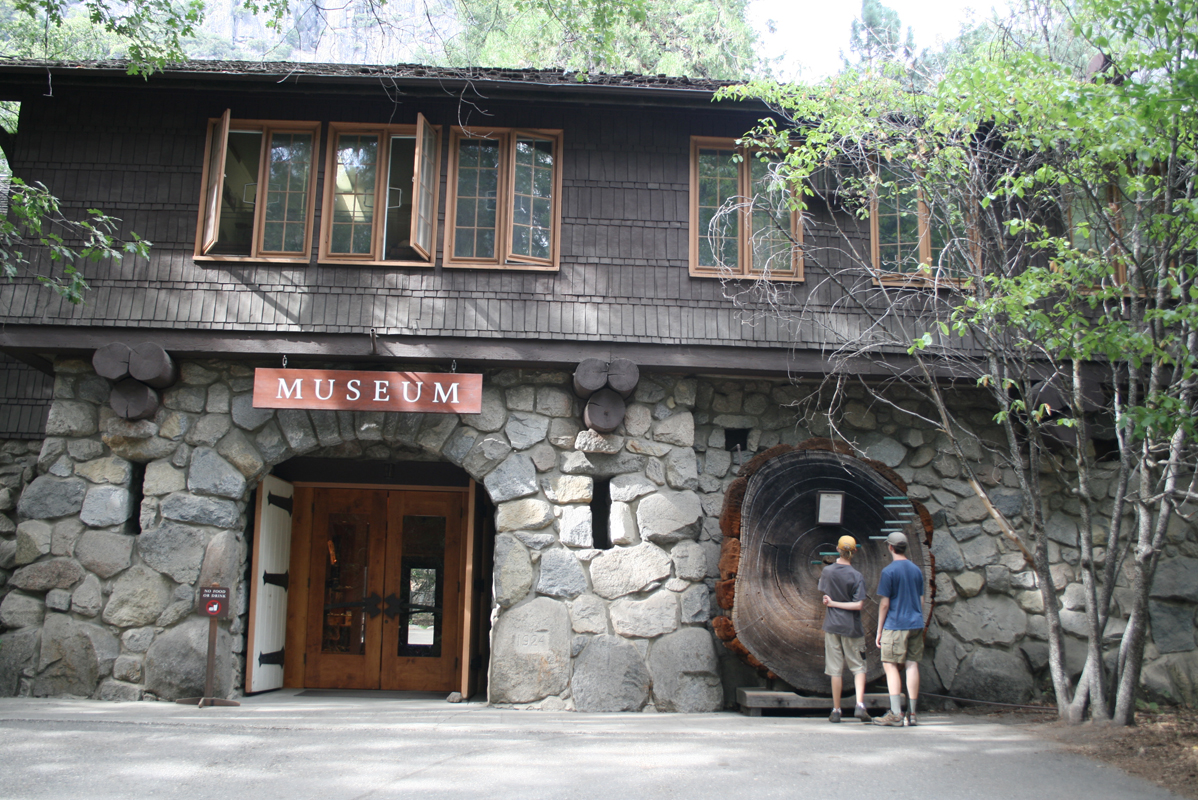
- View of the south entrance

- Location within California
- Established: May 29, 1926
- Location: Village Drive; Yosemite Valley, California
- Architect: Herbert Maier
- Website: www.nps.gov/yose/learn/historyculture/yosemite-museum.htm

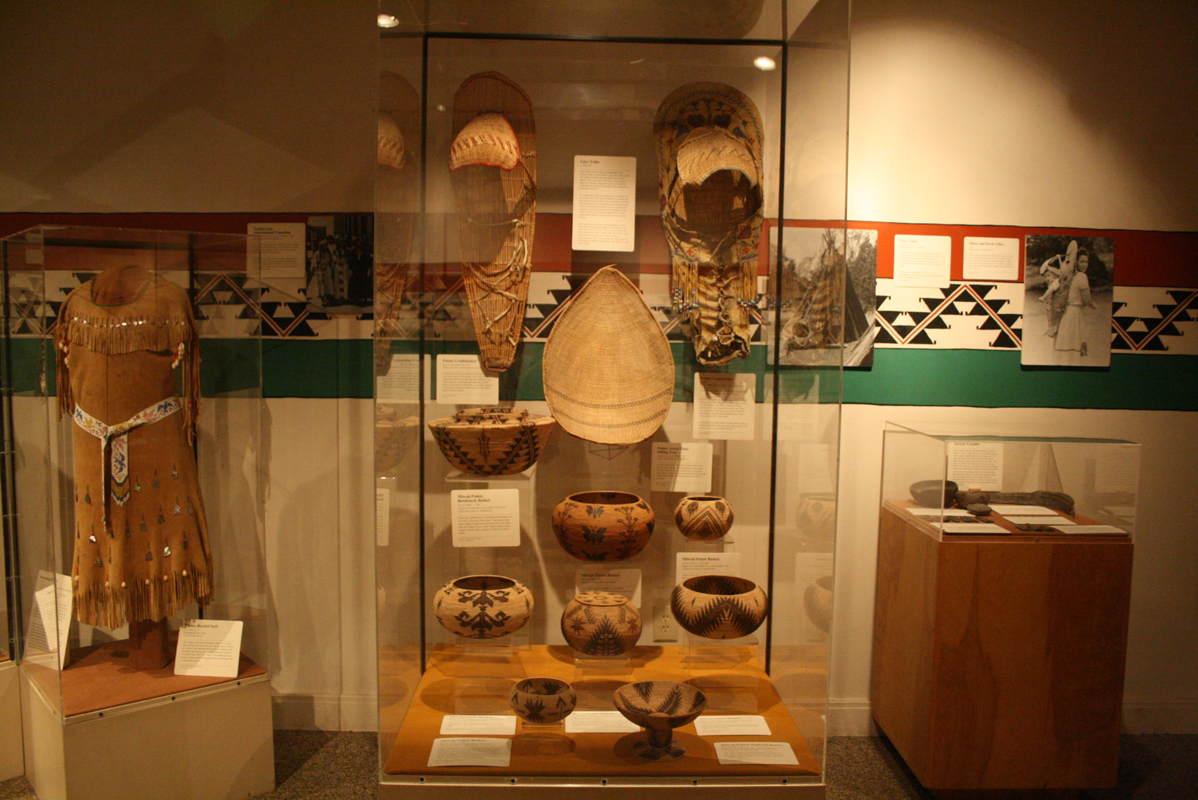
Yosemite Museum display of clothing, baskets, cradle boards, and tools of the Ahwahnechee people.

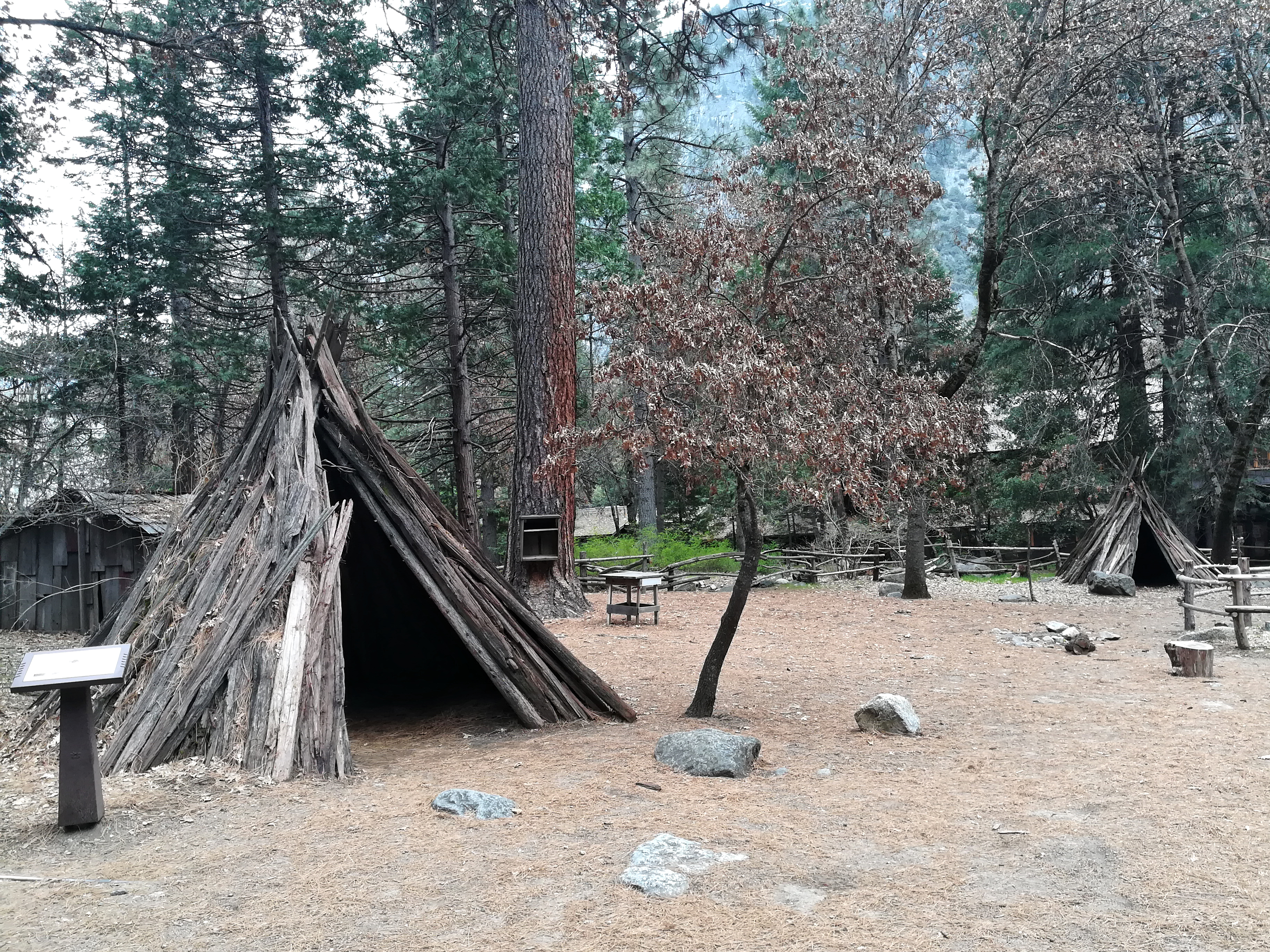
Tents of the Ahwahnechee people.

The Yosemite Museum is located in Yosemite Valley in Yosemite National Park in California. Founded in 1926 through the efforts of Ansel Franklin Hall, the museum's displays focus on the heritage and culture of the Ahwahnechee people who lived in the valley. The collection includes both utilitarian and made-for-sale baskets dating from c. 1870 to present and is one of the only existing collections encompassing this depth and time span for any group in California.

The Yosemite Museum was the first museum built in the National Park Service. The museum's educational initiatives would serve as examples for other parks across the country.

The adjacent Yosemite Valley Visitor Center features exhibits about the park's geology, wildlife, Native American and other settlers, John Muir, and the park's history.

== History ==
=== Background ===
The Yosemite Museum came 22 years after the first attempt to bring interpretation into Yosemite. In 1904, an arboretum was established in Wawona by Acting Superintendent Major John Bigelow and members of the 9th Cavalry Regiment. It was discontinued the following year when the location was found to be outside the park boundary.

The museum program began developing in 1915 with the addition of a display in the Chief Ranger's office. Chief Ranger Forest Townsley prepared the exhibit which mainly consisted of local wildlife. That year's superintendent's annual report recorded "this office has taken the necessary steps, from both an educational standpoint as well as a standpoint of interest not only to tourists but to the ranger department and park employees, to provide for a collection of the different varieties of animals, birds, insects, woods, flowers, and other specimens to be placed in a room set aside for this purpose in a Government building."

Two major additions came five years later in 1920. Chris Jorgensen's former home and studio near Sentinel Bridge in Yosemite Valley became available to the growing museum. That same year, Ansel Hall was designated as the Information Ranger. He began creating displays in the new space and by summer 1921 the museum included rooms dedicated to history, ethnology, and natural history, as well as a terrarium.

The museum opened on June 17, 1922. Visitors could explore six rooms dedicated to "the history, ethnology, geology, natural history, botany, and trees of the region." The museum proved popular, inspiring monetary donations and museum objects to be offered to the museum.

In 1922, Superintendent W.B. Lewis created a Park Naturalist Department and assigned Ansel Hall the first Park Naturalist role, placing him in charge of the museum, the nature guide service, and other educational activities. This same year a tree room and a geology room were added to the museum.

A high value donation of basketry was accepted by the museum in May 1922. This donation fueled Hall's desire for a new, purpose-built museum to protect the growing and increasingly valuable collection. He then approached architect Herbert Maier to create plans and sketches for a proposed museum.

=== Funding and construction ===
The idea of establishing park museums to promote outdoor education had national support in the 1920s, and the Yosemite Museum was a direct beneficiary. The Committee on Museums in National Parks, set up by the American Association of Museums, presented proposals for such museums to the Laura Spelman Rockefeller Memorial, and two awards were made. One was a grant of $70,500 to build and equip a museum in Yosemite to serve as a model for this type of facility. The building was completed and presented to the NPS by the American Association of Museums in 1925 and was opened to the public in 1926. The two story building housed exhibits on geology, natural history, history, and ethnography as well as a research library, workrooms, and a meeting room.

The Yosemite Museum was largely converted to office space for non museum functions after the new Valley Visitor Center opened in 1966. The vast majority of the collection is in storage, although some objects are exhibited in the Indian Cultural Exhibit (opened in 1976), the Museum Gallery (opened in 1988), the Pioneer Yosemite History Center, and the El Portal Transportation Exhibit. Objects are often loaned to other museums and institutions for exhibition and research. NPS staff and outside researchers rely on the resources of the Yosemite Museum collection and the closely associated Research Library and Archives in their investigations of the human and natural history of the park.

== Collections ==
The museum collection is one of the largest in the National Park System. Highlights of the Yosemite Museum's collection include:

- First sketches of Yosemite by Thomas A. Ayres
- John Muir's tin cup
- Landscape paintings by Thomas Hill, Thomas Moran, William Keith, and Albert Bierstadt.
- 100,000 historic park photographs
- Baskets by Lucy Telles and Maggie Howard
- The Schwabacher Basket Collection (Mono Lake Paiute and Miwok)

== Architecture ==
The National Park Service rustic style became a cornerstone of the National Park Service's belief that buildings should blend in with their natural surroundings and that natural settings could influence architecture. Indigenous building material, such as native rocks, logs, and shakes (wood shingles), were utilized for all visible exterior parts. The architectural philosophy was that "(rustic style) gives the feeling of having been executed by pioneer craftsmen with limited hand tools. It thus achieves sympathy with natural surroundings and with the past."

The Yosemite Museum is exemplary of rustic style. It was constructed in the heart of an emerging village center, in which all buildings were to have a unified architectural theme. Museum architect Herbert Maier described the relationship between the Museum and its natural surroundings by saying, "The elevation of the museum stresses the horizontal—that seemed the logic of the situation ... to attempt altitudinal impressiveness here in a building would have meant entering into a competition with the cliffs."

Maier went on to design many structures that are considered exemplary rustic style. In 1933, Maier was hired by the National Park Service as the regional director for the Civilian Conservation Corps (CCC) work in state parks. In this capacity, Maier helped develop guidebooks to assist state park designers in using rustic design principles. These books were widely distributed and influenced design of park structures nationwide at a time when hundreds of new parks were developed with CCC labor.

== See also ==
- History of the Yosemite area
- Indigenous peoples of California
