= Laurencita Herrera =

Laurencita R. Herrera (1912–1984) was a renowned Native American Cochiti Pueblo artist, specializing in traditional Cochiti figurative pottery called storytellers and her pottery vessels. She is of the Herrera family, a renowned family of Pueblo potters in New Mexico, whose work is often found in art collections and art museums. She was an actively making pottery between the 1930s through the 1970s and is known as one of the, "finest Cochiti potters of that era".

== About ==
Laurencita R. Herrera was born in 1912 at Cochiti Pueblo in Cochiti, New Mexico. She started learning pottery making from her mother Reyes Romero (c. 1890 -?). She was married to Cochiti Pueblo drum maker, Nestor Herrera. Together they had nine children and two of her daughters were potters, Seferina Ortiz (née Herrera) and Mary Francis Herrera. Many of her grandchildren are potters and artists, including Inez Ortiz, Virgil Ortiz, Joyce Lewis (née Ortiz), Janice Ortiz, Mary Ramona Herrera, and even some of her great-grandchildren, including Lisa Holt.

The Cochiti Pueblo has documented storyteller pottery for sale to tourists as early as the 1870s, however the tradition had become less popular until 1964, when Helen Cordero created the first revival of the Cochiti storyteller figure due to a request from her patron, Alexander Girard. A number of artists at the time started creating pottery of either animal figurines, adult figures holding drums or pots ("singing ladies"), and/or adult figures singing to a baby in their arms ("singing mothers"), including artists Laurencita Herrera, Damacia Cordero, Teresita Romero.

Her artwork is on permanent display at the Indian Pueblo Cultural Center in Albuquerque, New Mexico and in the permanent museum collection at the Museum of International Folk Art in Santa Fe, New Mexico and in the Bandelier Museum within the Bandelier National Monument.
