= Inez Ortiz =

20th-21st century Native American potter

Juanita Inez Ortiz, also known as Inez Ortiz (1960 – 2008) was a Native American Cochiti Pueblo artist, specializing in pottery. She is of the Herrera family of Pueblo potters in New Mexico, whose work is often found in art collections and in art museums. She was from the Cochiti Pueblo in Cochiti, New Mexico.

== Biography ==
Inez Ortiz was born in 1960 into the Herrera family, known for their pueblo pottery. She started learning pottery making from her mother and grandmother at a very early age, as was traditionally done. Her pottery designs and shapes remained traditional much like those of her mother and unlike that of her siblings. She is the daughter of Cochiti potter Seferina Ortiz (1931–2007) and granddaughter of Cochiti potter, Laurencita Herrera (1912–1984). Her three siblings are also potters, Virgil Ortiz, Joyce Lewis, and Janice Ortiz. Additionally her daughter, Lisa Holt is also a potter and ceramist.

"I make all kinds of things: bears, nativity sets, miniatures, storyteller figurines, owls, turtles, and clay drums. I mold the 'couple' pieces [a man and woman together] in different sizes. I'm also into the ceramics to make some things easier. I go back to the traditional because people like it." - Inez Ortiz

Traditional Cochiti pottery has been disappearing for many decades. The creation of storytellers by Helen Cordero at Cochiti in 1964, and their ensuing popularity, resulted in Cochiti Pueblo potters turning to the production of these highly marketable forms. The older Cochiti style which primarily focused on animal and human figures was abandoned on a large scale.

Inez's brother Virgil began to recreate the figures that were made using the early 20th century Cochiti-style. Inez became inspired and impressed and began to make human and animal figures using traditional Cochiti techniques to create beautiful pottery and continue the work of her predecessors hundreds of years ago.

Her work is part of various permanent museum collections, including the Birmingham Museum of Art (BMA), the National Museum of the American Indian and the Spencer Museum of Art.
