= Alexander Girard =

American architect & designer (1907–1993)

Alexander Hayden Girard
- Born: May 24, 1907; New York City, U.S.
- Died: December 31, 1993 (aged 86); Santa Fe, New Mexico
- Education: Royal Institute of British Architects, Royal School of Architecture in Rome
- Known for: Architecture, textile design, interior design
- Spouse: Susan Needham Girard née March (m. 1936)

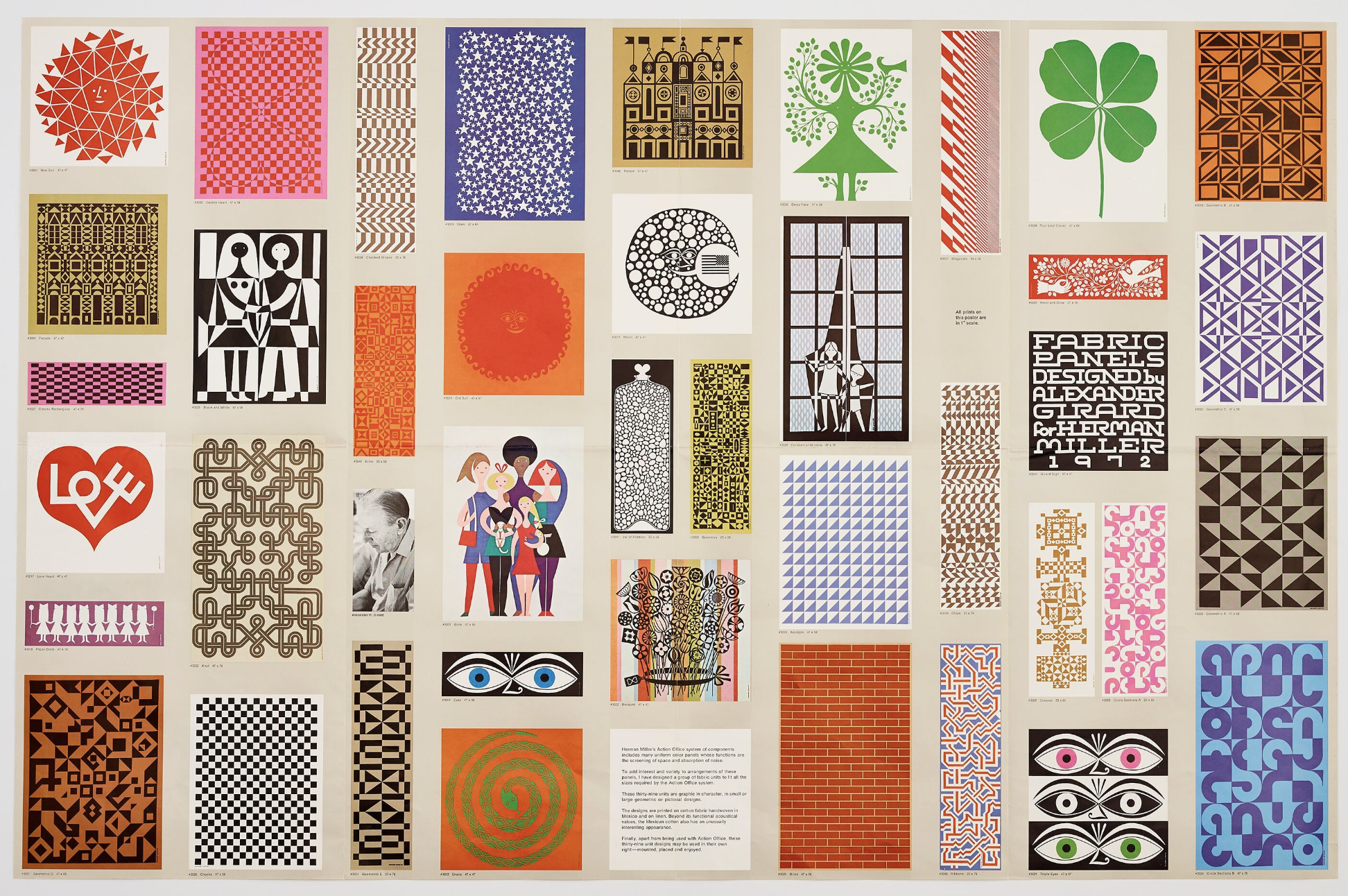
Fabric panels by Girard for Herman Miller (1972)

Alexander Girard (May 24, 1907 – December 31, 1993) was an architect, interior designer, furniture designer, industrial designer, and a textile designer.

== Early life ==
He was born in New York City to an American mother from Boston and a French-Italian father. He was raised in Florence, Italy and in 1917, he was sent as a boarder to Bedford Modern School in England leaving in 1924 to study architecture in London. After also graduating from the Royal School of Architecture in Rome, Girard refined his skills in both Florence and New York. In 1932, his studio was opened in New York and he moved it to Detroit in 1937.

== Career ==
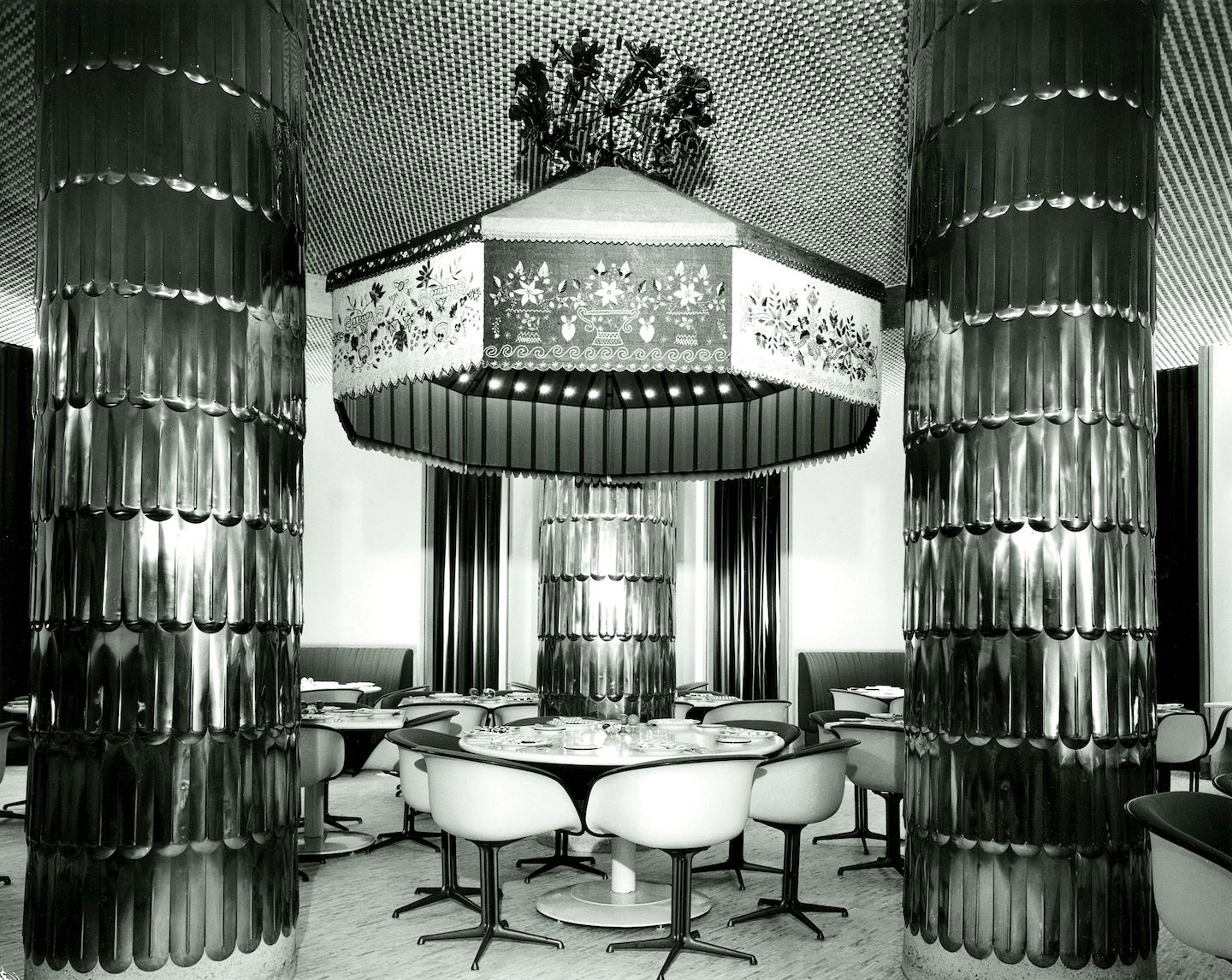
La Fonda Del Sol by Girard (1960)

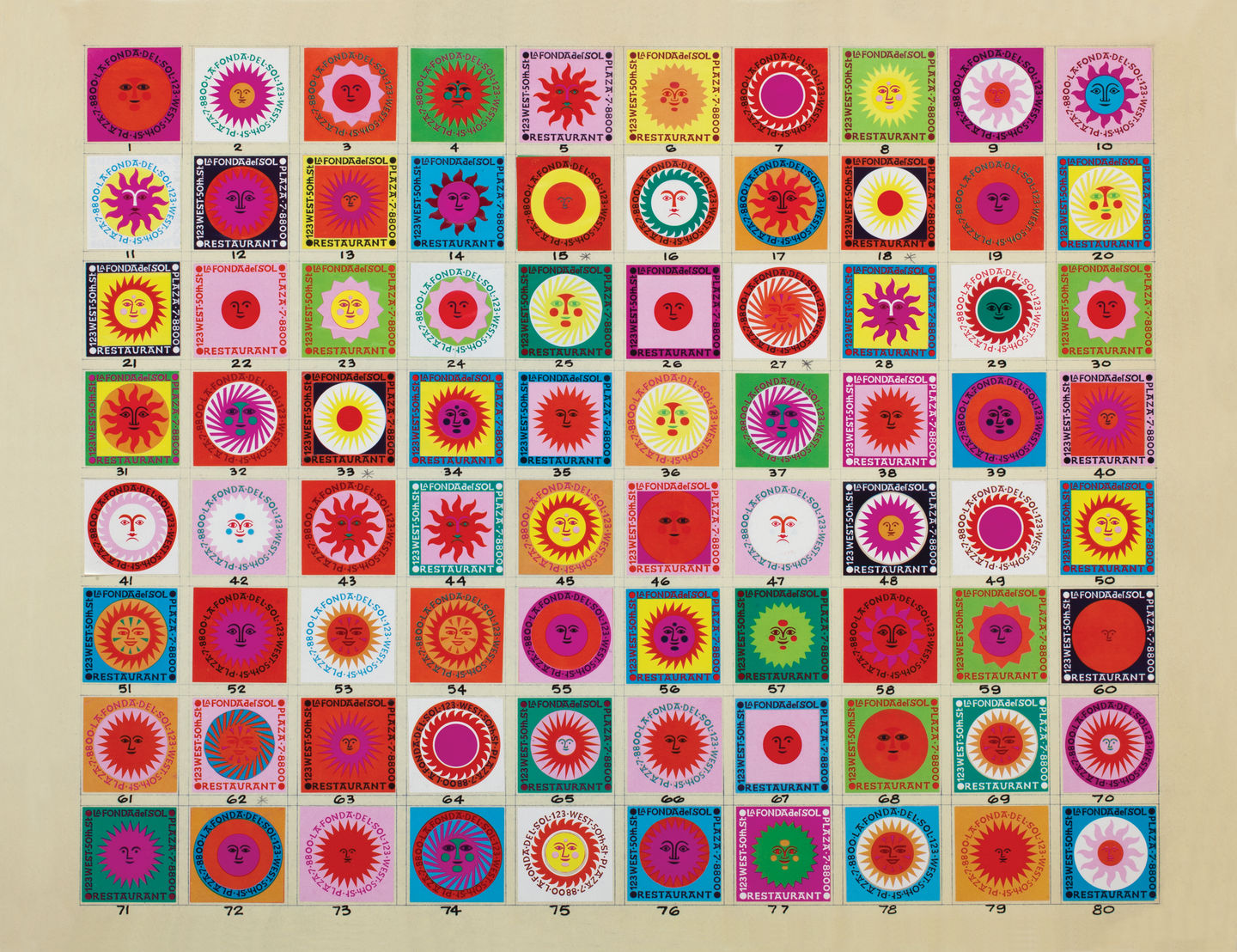
Colour studies for La Fonda Del Sol

Girard is widely known for his contributions in the field of American textile design, particularly through his work for Herman Miller (1952 to 1973), where he created fabrics for the designs of George Nelson and Charles and Ray Eames.

His work also includes designing the La Fonda del Sol Restaurant in New York (1960), the Herman Miller Showplace: T&O (Textiles and Objects) (1961), Braniff International Airways (1965), and the Girard Foundation (1962), which houses his extensive folk art collection. He and his wife, Susan Girard, amassed a remarkable collection of artifacts consisting of folk art, popular art, toys, and textiles from around the world, which is displayed through the Girard Foundation, founded 1962. One of the artists Girard supported was Cochiti Pueblo potter Helen Cordero, the creator of Storyteller pottery figurines.

Girard died from complications of Alzheimer's disease at his home in Santa Fe on December 31, 1993.

== Girard at Herman Miller ==
=== Herman Miller Textiles Division ===
In 1952, Alexander Girard was hired to head the fabric and textile division. Girard worked with George Nelson and Charles and Ray Eames to form a design team that has influenced the fundamentals of design throughout the United States and the rest of the world. Girard initially established a fabric collection based on his architectural training. His first fabric line consisted of plain upholsteries and geometric drapery prints—stripes, circles, and triangles. He went on to create many more patterns and designs, largely inspired by folk art. He also worked with a textile mill, Telares Uruapan, which he discovered in central Mexico, to create a line of handwoven 100% cotton fabrics. Because of the excellent quality and array of colors available, he developed a range of colorful "mexidots"and "mexistripes" which he used in many of his projects including installation backing, ground for environmental enrichment panels and upholstery.

Girard also developed a furniture collection for Herman Miller in 1967 building on his designs for Braniff Airlines' lounge and office furniture which featured a low sight line and interior/exterior shell separate from the seat cushion to maximize varied upholstery. Originals from this collection are rare and have become highly collectible, since they were quite expensive at the time and were in production only for one year. In 1971, he developed 40 screen printed graphics on fabrics for Robert Propst's Action Office 2 System. These Environmental Enrichment panels add a touch of warmth, color, and design to the office environment.

=== T&O (Textiles and Objects) 1961 ===
This Herman Miller showplace was a unique space filled with textiles and folk art pieces on Manhattan's East 53rd Street. Textiles and Objects was an innovation demonstrating textiles as an integral part of interior displays for both designers and the individual consumer. The showroom also featured folk art Girard collected from around the world. T&O closed in shortly after opening, due to insufficient marketing and a public was not quite ready to add such colorful and exotic objects to the typical 1950s, palette of their homes.

== Independent projects ==
=== Braniff Airways and "The End of The Plain Plane" ===
In May 1965, Girard began his design work for Braniff International Airways re-branding campaign called "The End of the Plain Plane". This project gave Girard the opportunity to work with textiles, color, and graphics on a grand scale, redesigning everything from the sugar packets to the ticket counters to the color of the planes themselves. He used colors like light and dark blue, beige, ochre, orange, turquoise, and lemon yellow to make the planes recognizable from the ground. Italian couturier fashion designer Emilio Pucci designed attendant uniforms.

Girard also designed a line of furniture for Braniff's ticket offices and customer lounges. This furniture was also available to the public by Herman Miller in 1967, but was available for one year only.

=== Restaurants ===
In 1960, Girard designed every aspect of the La Fonda del Sol restaurant located in Manhattan's Time-Life building in a Latin American and contemporary theme/style, including menus, matchbooks, tableware and the ceramic tiles on the floors and walls. Girard created over eighty different sun motifs found throughout the restaurant.

As part of the commission, Charles and Ray Eames were brought in to design a fabric covered fiberglass chair and table, both with a new pedestal design. The chairs were similar to the plastic Eames chairs with a modification to the top silhouette of the fiberglass bucket.

Girard was also commissioned by Brody to design the L'Etoile Restaurant (1966) in the Sherry Netherlands Hotel, New York, a French restaurant with austere decor featuring a range of silver and greys featuring glass engraved with the names of French luminaries and daisy shaped tables in the bar. The Compound Restaurant (1967), in Santa Fe, New Mexico, is in a clean modern yet traditional New Mexican style with inlaid Mexicotton ceiling tiles and nichos featuring a mix of folk art and Girard's own designs.

=== Georg Jensen ===
In 1956, Just Lunning, president of Georg Jensen, commissioned Girard to design seven table settings for an exhibition on 5th Avenue in New York. Each setting was created around a vignette outlining the personalities and situations of the company at the particular table. He created place mats and dishes specific to the project.

=== John Deere ===
Girard was commissioned to create a mural for the John Deere Company, in the entrance to their administration building designed by Eero Saarinen near Moline, Illinois. The mural is one hundred eighty feet long and eight feet high, created entirely with three dimensional found objects.

=== The Girard Foundation ===
In 1962, Girard and his wife established the Girard Foundation in Santa Fe to manage their art collection that numbered over 100,000 pieces, including toys, dolls, icons, and other ethnic expressions. Girard's design work was heavily influenced by his passion for folk art. In 1978, Girard contributed his immense collection to the Museum of International Folk Art in Santa Fe, New Mexico, United States. The museum opened to the public in 1953, and has gained national and international recognition as home to the world's largest collection of folk art.

The Girard Wing houses the popular permanent exhibition, Multiple Visions: A Common Bond, which showcases folk art, popular art, toys and textiles from more than 100 nations. Opening in 1982, this unorthodox exhibition was designed and installed by Girard, and remains popular with the public.

=== Additional projects ===
- Radio cabinets, interiors for Detrola Corporation (1943)
- Exhibition design, "Design for Modern Use, Made in U.S.A." Museum of Modern Art (1950)
- Rieveschi residence, Grosse Pointe, Michigan (1951)
- Miller House, Columbus, Indiana (1953)
- Exhibition design, "Good Design" Home Furnishings Exhibition, Museum of Modern Art (1954)
- Exhibition design, "Textiles and Ornamental Arts of India" Museum of Modern Art (1954)
- "Day of the Dead" documentary film, collaboration with Charles Eames (1956)
- Nativity Exhibition, sponsored by Hallmark Cards, Atkins Museum, Kansas City, Missouri
- Penthouse apartment for Hallmark Cards, Hallmark Building, Kansas City (1962)
- Gregory residence, Wayzata, Minnesota (1963, with architect I.W. Colburn)
- Interior design of the campus of St. John's College, Santa Fe, New Mexico (1964)
- Interior design of North Christian Church, Columbus, Indiana (1964)
- Indian government commissioned Girard and Eames to design the Memorial Exhibition for Nehru, Delhi, India (1965)
- "El Encanto de un Pueblo (The Magic of a People): International Exhibit for Hemisfair, San Antonio, Texas (1968)

== Wooden Dolls ==
Girard designed the Wooden Dolls in 1952. The Wooden Dolls were used for his Santa Fe home. They were human and animal characters with various colors. After Girard's heirs donated it to the Vitra Design Museum, it was studied and imitated and produced.

== Typography ==
Girard designed his own typeface and used it in other design works through typography. The fonts he designed are practical, illustrative and readable.

== Awards and recognition ==
- Gold Medal, Barcelona Exhibition, 1929
- Fabric Competition, Museum of Modern Art, New York, 1946
- St. Louis Memorial Competition, Winning Team Member, 1948
- Trail Blazer Award, Home Fashion League of New York, 1952
- Silver Medal, Architectural League of New York, 1962
- Elise de Wolfe Award, New York Chapter of American Institute of Interior Designers, 1966
- Governor’s Award, Outstanding Contribution to Fine Arts in New Mexico, 1981
- Designer’s West/Ray Bradbury Creativity Award, 1987

== Exhibitions ==
- Cooper Hewitt, Smithsonian Design Museum, The Opulent Eye of Alexander Girard, 2001
- San Francisco Museum of Modern Art, Alexander Girard: Vibrant Modern, 2006

=== Exhibition 'Alexander Girard: A Designer's Universe' ===
- Vitra Design Museum, Weilam Rhein, Germany 11 Mar 2016– 22 Jan 2017
- Cranbrook Art Museum, Bloomfield Hills, Michigan, USA Jan 17 2017– Oct 08 2017
- Hangaram Design Museum, Bloom field Hills, Seoul, South Korea, Dec 2017– Mar 2018
- Museum of Internationala Folk Art, Santa Fe, New Mexico, USA May 5, 2019– Oct 27 2019
- Palm Springs Art Museum, Palm Springs, California, USA Nov 23 2019– Mar 01 2020
- Franz Mayer Museum, Mexico City Jun 17 2020– October 11, 2020

== Gallery ==
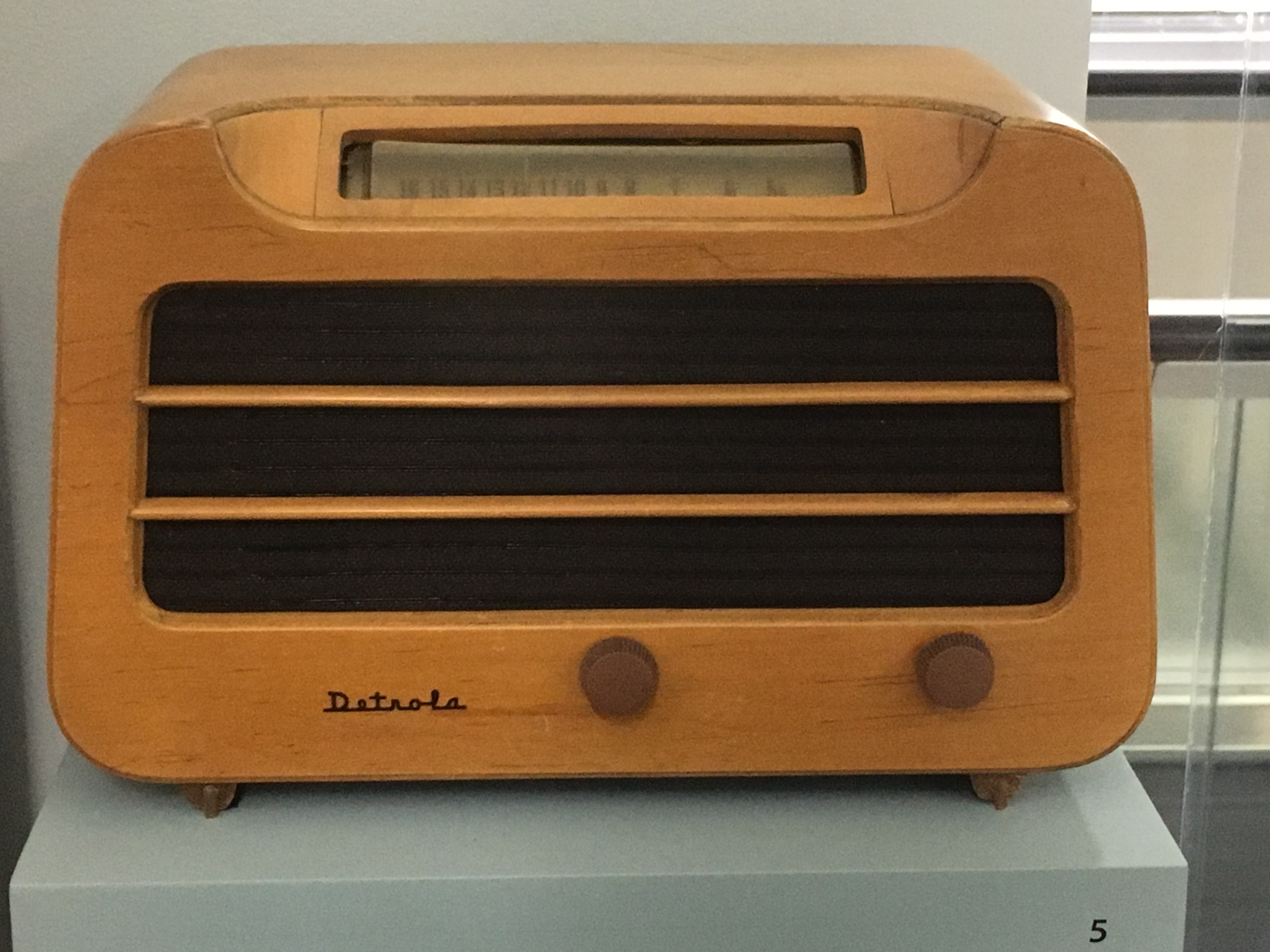
Detrola Model 579 (1946) radio designed by Girard, made of plywood

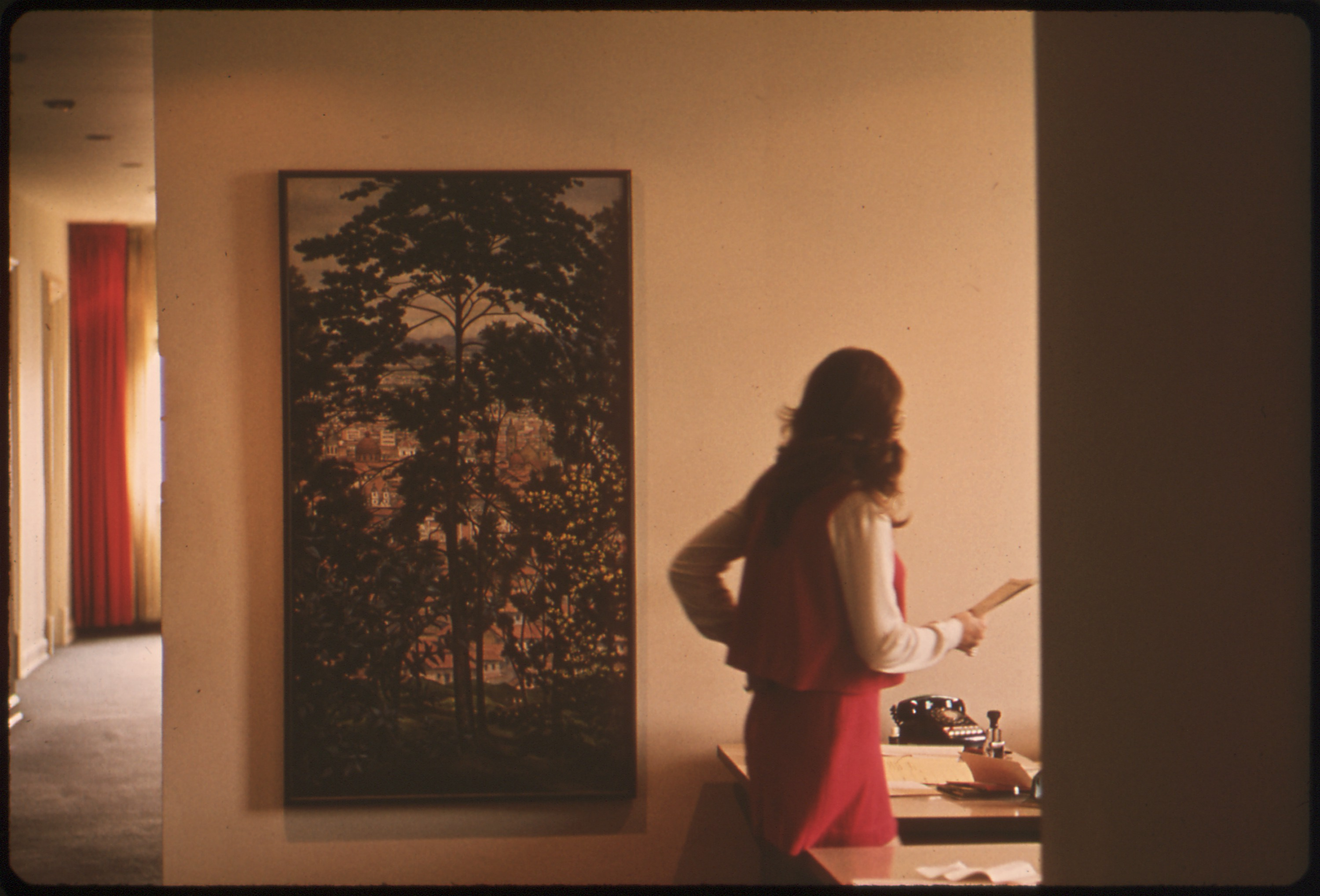
Girard-designed interior of Cummins Corporate Building

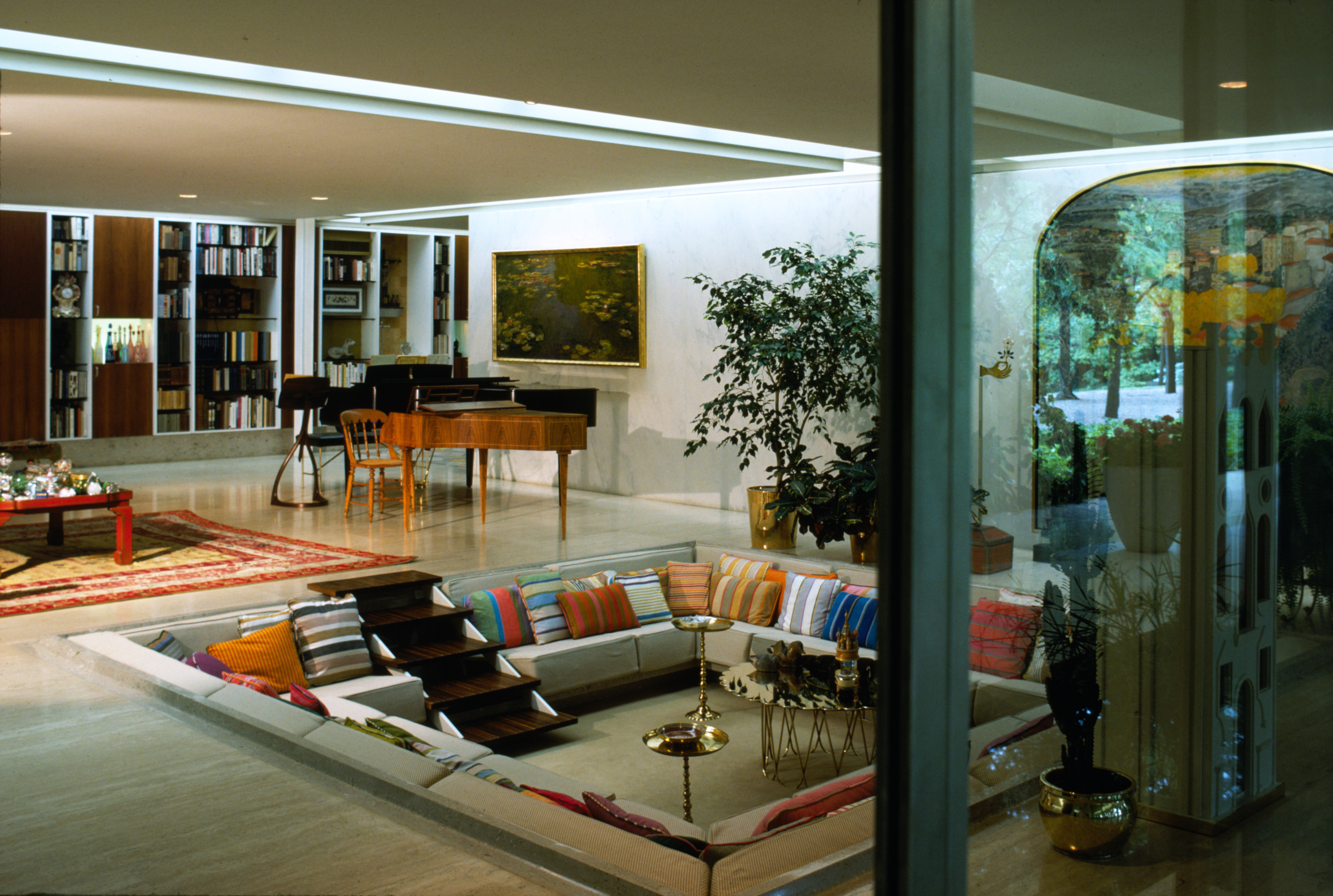
The influential early conversation pit in Saarinen's Miller House

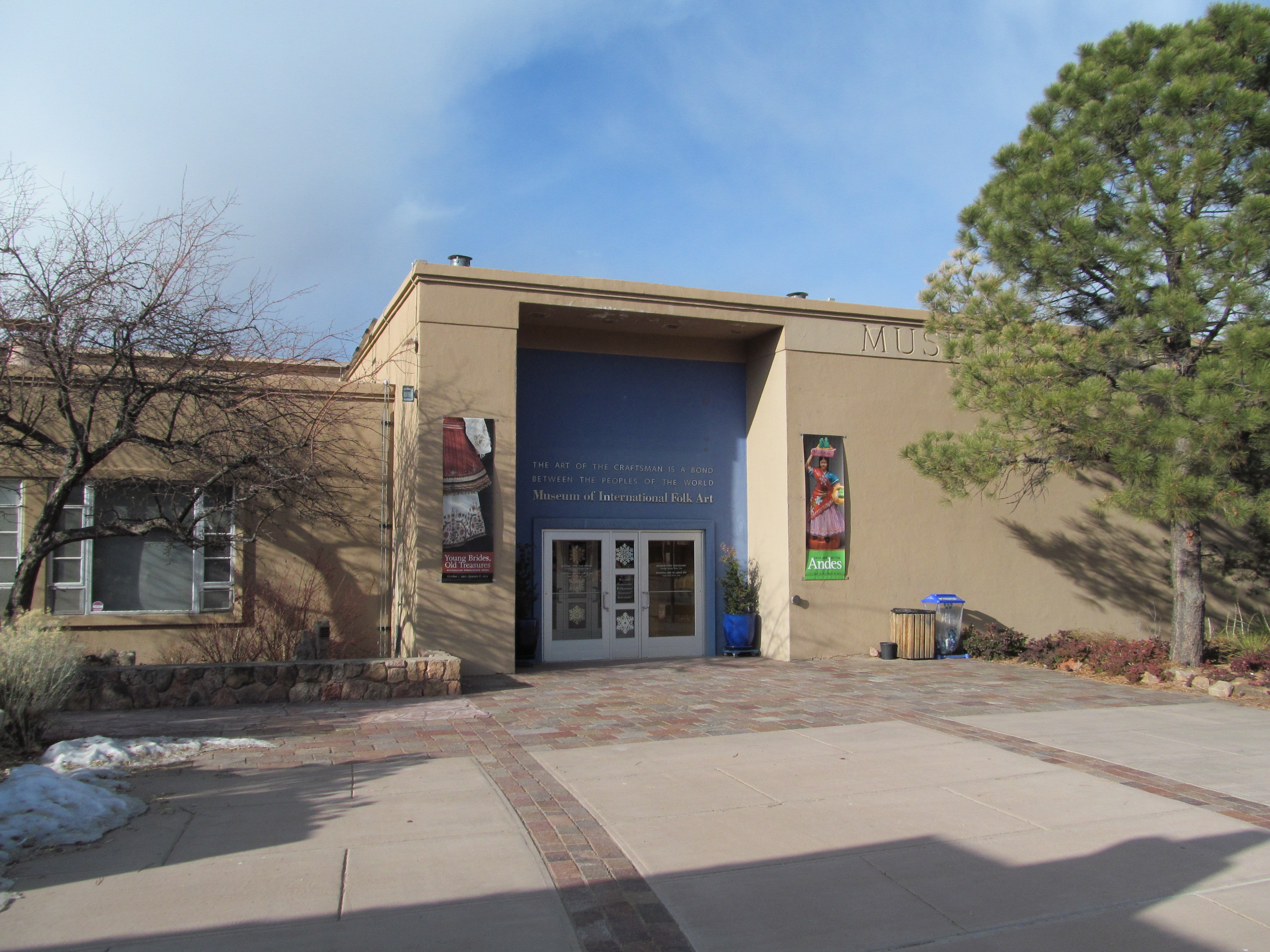
Museum of International Folk Art, Santa Fe, New Mexico, where Girard made significant contributions

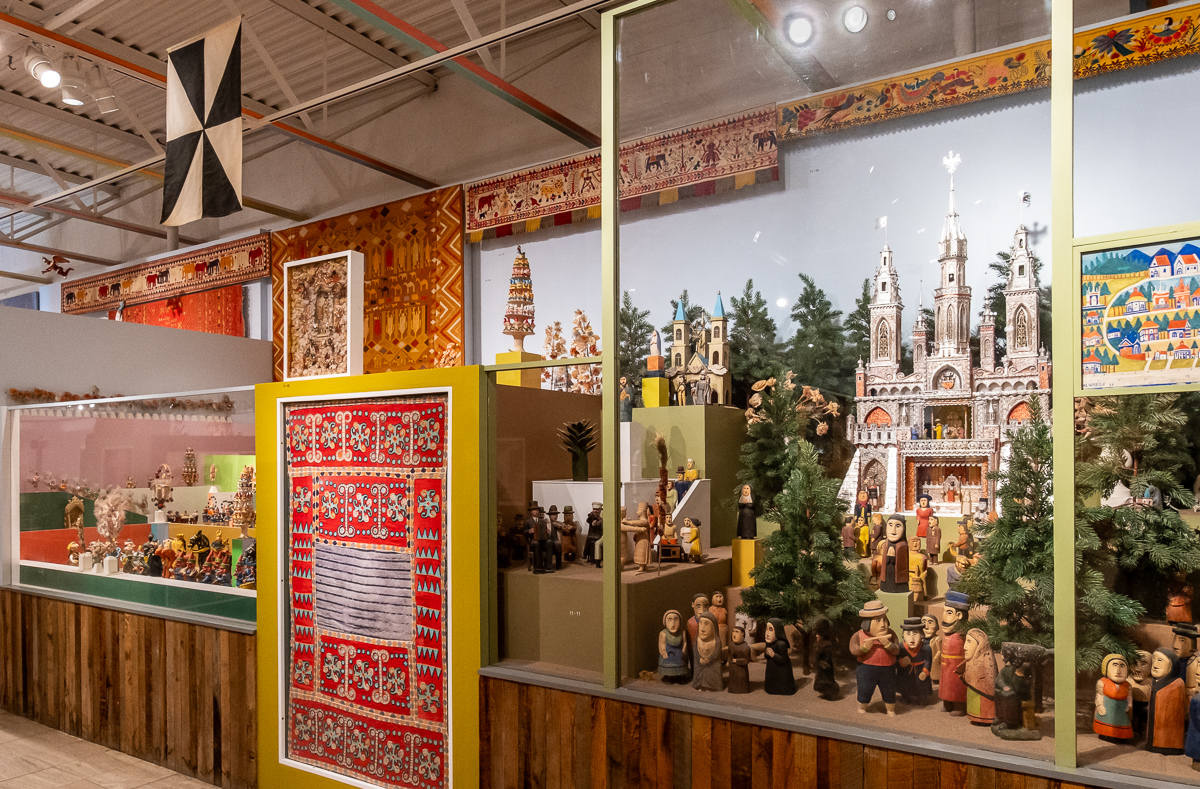
Girard Wing, Museum of International Folk Art, Santa Fe
