= Jemez Day School =

Coordinates: 35.61016°N 106.73140°W

Jemez Day School is a Bureau of Indian Education (BIE)-operated school in Jemez Pueblo, New Mexico. It covers elementary school grades.

== History ==
In the 1950s the school's students made artwork that was exhibited in the United States and France, and visitors to the school acquired artwork made by the students.

The North Central Association accredited the school in 1981, and Jemez was the first Bureau of Indian Affairs (BIA) school in the state to get such an award. In 1988 the school had 180 students. The National Indian School Boards Association, that year, gave the school an award to the school board and to Jannita Complo, the principal.

== Curriculum ==
In 1989 the school had a mixing of on-track and remedial students known as the "join-in" program. It also had a "spontaneous speech" program where students give impromptu speeches about Jemez culture.

In 1988, the school had dance classes involving dances seen in Broadway theatre and in the Jemez people culture.
