= Evelyn M. Vigil =

Native American artist (1921–1995)

Evelyn Vigil
- Born: 1921
- Died: 1995 (aged 73–74); Jemez Pueblo, New Mexico, U.S.
- Known for: Ceramics

Evelyn Vigil (Towa: Phan-Un-Pha-Kee) (1921 – 1995), was a Jemez Pueblo ceramic artist.

== Early life and background ==
Her ancestry is traced back to the last residents of Pecos Pueblo that moved to Jemez Pueblo in 1838 after violence and raids by the Spanish, Apache, and Comanche.

== Art career ==
Together with Juanita Toledo, another Pecos descendant and potter, Vigil helped rediscover and revive the Pecos Pueblo style of glazeware pottery.

For much of the 1970s and 1980s, Vigil and Toledo joined rangers and volunteers at Pecos National Historic Park studying materials and techniques used by the Pecos people in order to recreate historic Pecos Pueblo-style pottery. They worked with a variety of different types of local clays, tempers, natural pigments, kilning temperatures, and firewoods to create pots that matched the thin-walled pottery and glazes originally made by the Pecos Pueblo in 1250 to 1700.

== Honors ==
The New Mexico Historic Women Marker Initiative erected an Official Scenic Historic Markers in Jemez Pueblo, New Mexico in the effort to recognize Vigil and Toledo's contributions to New Mexico history.
