= Jemez Pueblo, New Mexico =

Jemez Pueblo, New Mexico Walatowa (Jemez)
- CDP
- Motto: The Gateway of the Jemez World
- Location of Jemez Pueblo, New Mexico

- Location in the United States
- Coordinates: 35°36′24″N 106°44′00″W
- Country: United States
- State: New Mexico
- County: Sandoval

Government
  - Governor: George Shendo Jr.

Area
  - Total: 2.05 sq mi (5.31 km^{2})
  - Land: 2.05 sq mi (5.30 km^{2})
  - Water: 0.0039 sq mi (0.01 km^{2})
- Elevation: 5,555 ft (1,693 m)

Population (2020)
  - Total: 1,963
  - Density: 960.2/sq mi (370.72/km^{2})
- Time zone: UTC-7 (Mountain (MST))
  - Summer (DST): UTC-6 (MDT)
- ZIP code: 87024
- Area code: 575
- FIPS code: 35-35250
- GNIS feature ID: 2408443
- Jemez Pueblo
- U.S. National Register of Historic Places
- U.S. Historic district
- NM State Register of Cultural Properties
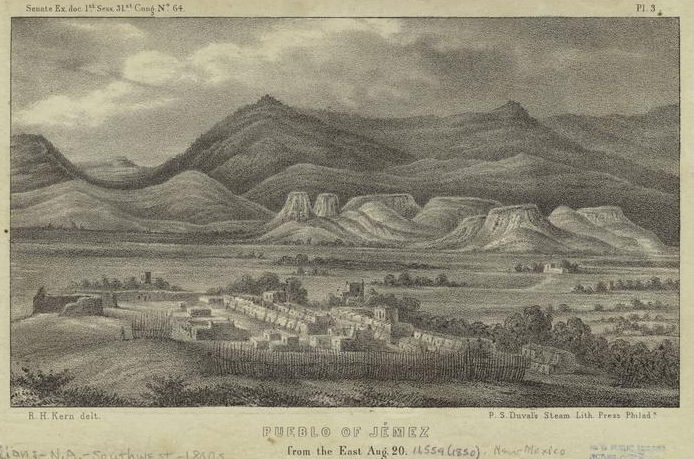
- Jemez Pueblo, 1850 illustration

- Location within New Mexico
- Nearest city: Bernalillo, New Mexico
- Area: 124 acres (50 ha)
- Built: 1700
- Architectural style: Late Victorian, Pueblo
- NRHP reference No.: 77000926
- NMSRCP No.: 235

Significant dates
- Added to NRHP: May 2, 1977
- Designated NMSRCP: February 1, 1972

Jemez Pueblo (/ˈhɛmɛz/; Jemez: Walatowa, Navajo: Mąʼii Deeshgiizh) is a federally recognized tribe and census-designated place (CDP) in Sandoval County, New Mexico, United States. The population was 1,963 at the 2020 census. It is part of the Albuquerque metropolitan area.

The CDP is named after the pueblo at its center. Among Jemez people, it is known as Walatowa. It was likely the location of the Franciscan Mission San Diego de la Congregacion.

== Geography ==
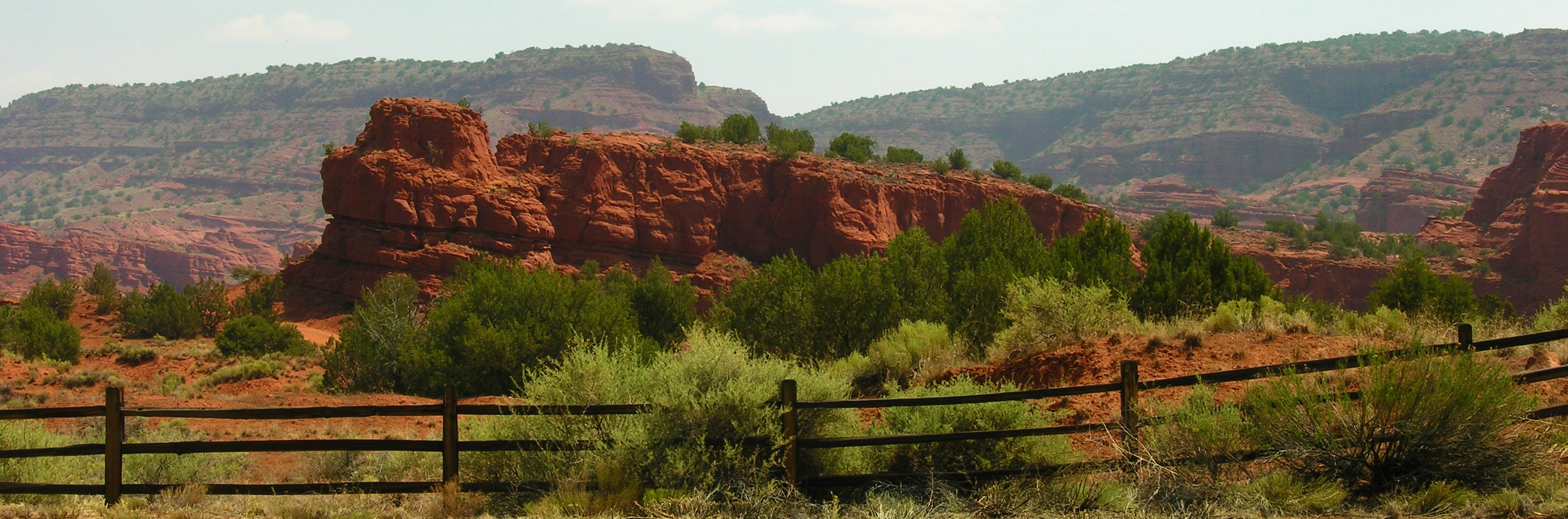
"Red Rocks" in Jemez Pueblo

According to the United States Census Bureau, the CDP has a total area of 2 square miles (5.2 km^{2}), all land. The pueblo is rural and located near the Red Rocks formation.

== Language ==
The Jemez Pueblo have historically spoken the Towa language, a member of the Tanoan language family. It is an unwritten language.

== Demographics ==
Historical population
Census	Pop.	Note	%±
2020	1,963		—
U.S. Decennial Census

The tribe has about 3,400 citizens. At the pueblo, unemployment is 27%. Of the heads of households, 70% have graduated high school.

It seems that a significant part of the Jemez Pueblo population originates from the surviving remnant of the Pecos Pueblo population who fled to Jemez Pueblo in 1838.

As of the census of 2000, there were 1,953 people, 467 households, and 415 families residing in the CDP. The population density was 957.0 inhabitants per square mile (369.5/km^{2}). There were 499 housing units at an average density of 244.5 per square mile (94.4/km^{2}). The racial makeup of the CDP was 0.41% White, 99.13% Native American, 0.31% from other races, and 0.15% from two or more races. Hispanic or Latino of any race were 1.95% of the population.

There were 467 households, out of which 39.0% had children under the age of 18 living with them, 39.2% were married couples living together, 35.1% had a female householder with no husband present, and 11.1% were non-families. 9.9% of all households were made up of individuals, and 2.8% had someone living alone who was 65 years of age or older. The average household size was 4.18 and the average family size was 4.45.

In the CDP, the population was spread out, with 35.0% under the age of 18, 11.1% from 18 to 24, 28.8% from 25 to 44, 18.4% from 45 to 64, and 6.7% who were 65 years of age or older. The median age was 28 years. For every 100 females, there were 94.7 males. For every 100 females age 18 and over, there were 86.9 males.

The median income for a household in the CDP was $28,889, and the median income for a family was $30,880. Males had a median income of $20,964 versus $17,262 for females. The per capita income for the CDP was $8,045. About 27.2% of families and 25.5% of the population were below the poverty line, including 27.1% of those under age 18 and 34.6% of those age 65 or over.

== Government ==
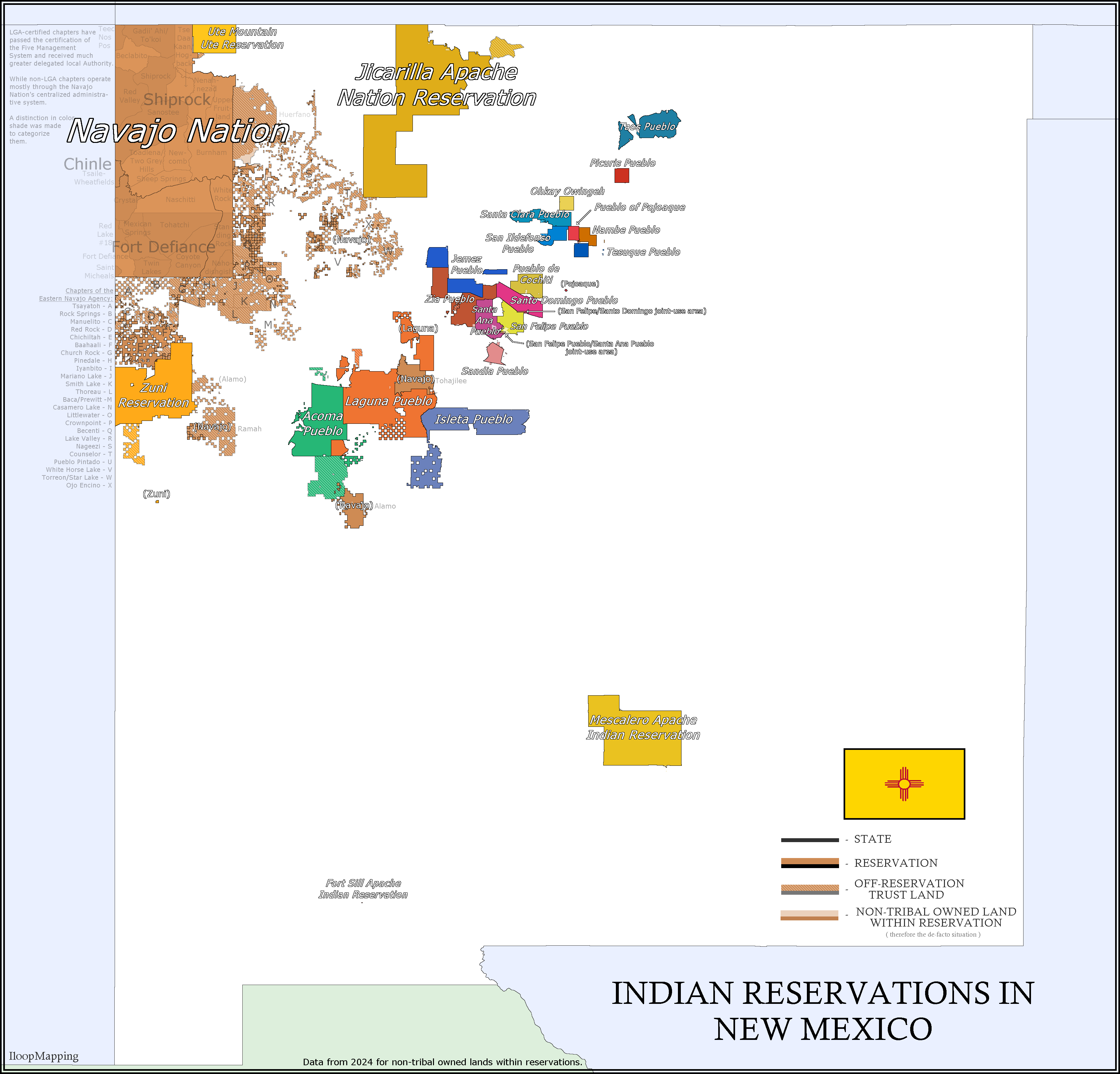
Map of the Jemez and neighboring tribes (In blue).

The leadership of the Pueblo of Jemez is annually selected by Jemez religious leaders. The current administration is:

- Governor: John Galvan
- First Lieutenant Governor: Matthew Gachupin Jr.
- Second Lieutenant Governor: Thurman Loretto

== Economic development ==
The Jemez Pueblo owns a convenience store. They are not a gaming tribe.

== Ethnobotany ==
Carex is sacred and used in ceremonies.

== Jemez runners ==
As much as 70% of the 1,890 Jemez people were living on their reservation lands in the early 1970s. Though by then an increasing number were switching to wage-earning work rather than agriculture, the residents continued to raise chile peppers, corn, and wheat, to speak their Native language, and to maintain customary practices.

Running, an old Jemez pastime and ceremonial activity, grew even more popular than it had been before World War II. Prior to the advent of television at Jemez, tales of running feats had been a major form of entertainment on winter nights. Races continued to hold their ceremonial place as the years passed, their purpose being to assist the movement of the sun and moon or to hasten the growth of crops, for example. At the same time, they became a popular secular sport. The year 1959 saw the first annual Jemez All-Indian Track and Field Meet, won by runners from Jemez seven times in the first ten years. A Jemez runner, Steve Gachupin, won the Pikes Peak Marathon six times, setting a record in 1968 by reaching the top in just 2 hours, 14 minutes, 56 seconds.

== Education ==
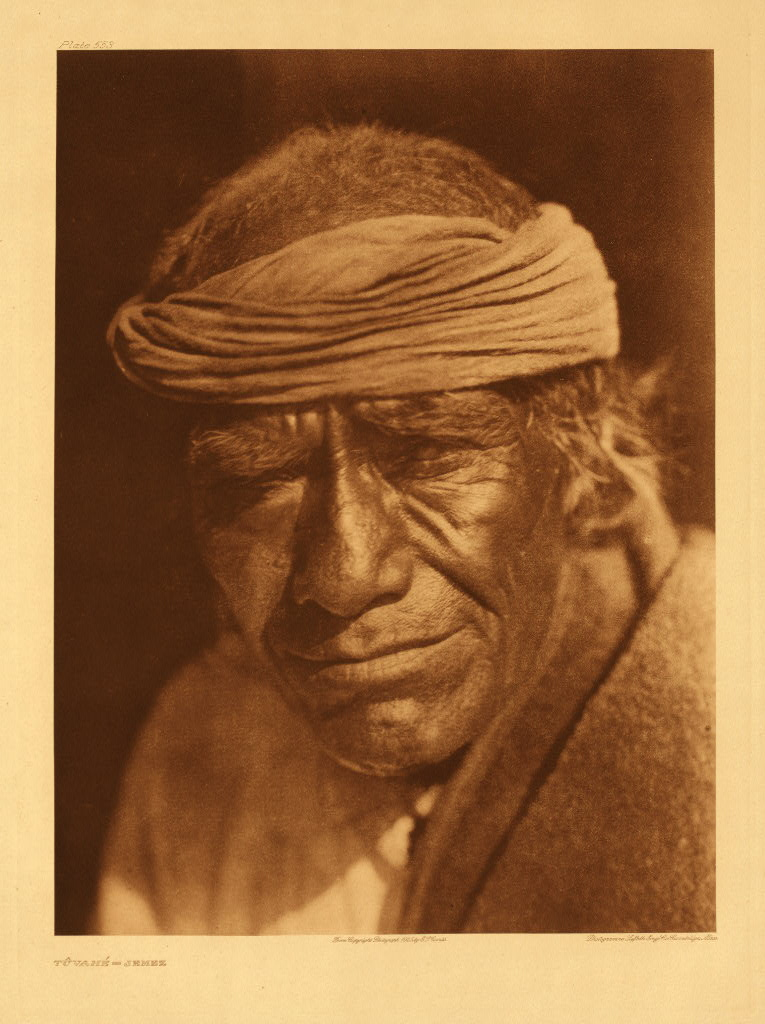
Tuvahe, photographed at Jemez Pueblo by Edward S. Curtis

It is within the Jemez Valley Public Schools school district.

Jemez Day School, a federal elementary school operated by the Bureau of Indian Education, is in Jemez Pueblo.

Jemez Pueblo Community Library and Archives is in the community.

== Notable tribal citizens ==
- Cliff Fragua, Jemez sculptor
- James Madalena, former member of the New Mexico House of Representatives
- Benny Shendo, member of the New Mexico Senate
- Mary Ellen Toya, (1934–1990), artist
- Evelyn M. Vigil, artist

== Notable residents ==
- N. Scott Momaday (Kiowa, 1934–2024), novelist, short story writer, essayist and poet who won the Pulitzer Prize for Fiction

== See also ==
- Jemez Historic Site- Formerly Jemez State Monument
- Jemez River
- Jemez Springs, New Mexico
- National Register of Historic Places listings in Sandoval County, New Mexico
- Pueblo peoples
- Pueblo Revolt
