= Mary Ellen Toya =

Jemez Pueblo potter

- Born: 1934
- Died: 1990 (aged 55–56)
- Known for: Ceramics
- Spouse(s): Casimiro Toya, Sr.

Mary Ellen Toya (1934–1990) was a Jemez Pueblo potter of the Water Clan. She was active ca. 1950–1990, and was known for creating some of the largest Storyteller figures.

== Family ==
Mary Toya was married to Casimiro Toya, Sr. Their children are Melinda Toya Fragua, Mary Ellen Toya (M. Ellen Toya), Judy Toya, Marie Roberta Toya, Yolanda Toya, Casimiro Toya, Jr., Etta Toya Gachupin, and Anita Toya. She passed the pottery-making tradition onto her daughters.

== Work ==
Toya worked with matte polychrome, red and black-on-tan Storytellers, jars, bowls, plates, and wedding vases. Her favorite designs were kiva steps, terrace clouds, and cloud tracers.

=== Exhibits ===
- Toya, Mary E. and Toya, Anita. Traditional pit-fired Storytellers. April 1994. Bryans Gallery, Taos, New Mexico

=== Collections ===
- Toya, Mary E. Storyteller figure. Ceramic. Spurlock Museum of World Cultures, Urbana, Illinois

== See also ==
- List of Native American artists
