= Virgil Ortiz =

Pueblo artist (born 1969)

- Born: 1969 (age 56–57); Cochiti Pueblo, New Mexico, U.S.
- Known for: Experimental Native Pottery, Native Fashion Design, Immersive Art, Murals, Native Jewelry Design

- Virgil Ortiz portrait, 2012

Virgil Ortiz (born 1969) is a Pueblo artist, known for his pottery and fashion design from Cochiti Pueblo, New Mexico. Ortiz makes a variety of pottery, including traditional Cochiti figurative pottery, experimental figurative pottery, traditional pottery vessels. His clothing and jewelry designs are influenced by traditional Native American pattern and aesthetics. He is best known for his edgy pottery figures, his contemporary take on the traditional Cochiti pottery figures (monos) from the late 1800s.

== About ==
Virgil Ortiz was born in 1969 at Cochiti Pueblo in New Mexico and was the youngest of six children. He is of the Herrera family of Pueblo potters in New Mexico, whose work is often found in art collections and in art museums. Virgil's mother is noted potter Seferina Ortiz (1931–2007) and grandson of Cochiti potter, Laurencita Herrera (1912–1984). His mother taught him to make traditional Cochiti pueblo pottery. "The thought has never crossed my mind to be anything other than an artist and fashion designer. Art is in my blood," he said. His three siblings are also potters, Inez Ortiz, Joyce Lewis, and Janice Ortiz.

Virgil won his first Santa Fe Indian Market award at the age of 14. "I grew up participating in Indian Market, it was always an exciting time for my family," he said. By age 16, Virgil Ortiz was a successful working artist and he began to travel. "I would have a show, sell pottery and save," he said in an interview. "With the money saved I would take a friend and we would travel to different cities -- New York, Chicago, Los Angeles -- and I got to experience different cultures." Virgil was drawn to the night club scene. There he saw many people with tattoos and piercings that reminded him of the 1800s Cochiti figures.

"I was inspired to create images of what I saw, it gave me a freedom knowing that I was not an innovator or even going outside of tradition, I was in fact a Revivalist," he said.

Virgil's work is greatly influenced and focused on historical events such as the 1680 Pueblo Revolt. Through his work, artist, Virgil Ortiz hopes to teach the new generation of pottery artists the history of his people's ways and what happened to his people. "The pieces may be seen as the culmination of Ortiz's crusade to educate the world about what he calls "the first American Revolution." Educating people about his heritage is what motivates him in his unique diverse work. Virgil Ortiz's inspiration comes from blending his traditional Cochiti ways with modern Sci-Fi. According to the Colorado Springs Fine Art Center, his inspiration vastly comes from Star Wars as he often ditches pottery markets to further expand his love of sci-fi modernism. "For nearly two decades, Virgil Ortiz has told the story of the 1680 Pueblo Revolt through his artwork, and simultaneously makes it more relevant and engaging to the next generation by using contemporary art to blend historic events with sci-fi fantasy – think Star Wars, Prometheus, The Avengers, and Justice League. His material choices and techniques draw from the past, while his imagery is both ultramodern and futuristic." Through his pottery, Virgil Ortiz cultivates his traditional roots and melds them with a futurist twist.

== Honors and awards ==
Ortiz was selected to be a United States Artists, Target Fellow in 2007, in Crafts and Traditional Arts.

Ortiz received the 2022 Living Treasure Award from the Museum of Indian Arts and Culture.

== Collections ==
Virgil Ortiz's works are in various permanent museum collections, including the National Museum of the American Indian, Stedelijk Museum, Museum of Indian Arts & Culture, Virginia Museum of Fine Arts, Albuquerque Museum, and others.

== Work ==
=== Traditional Cochiti pottery figures (monos ) ===
During the early days of the transcontinental railroad, Cochiti artists caricatured the travelers—circus performers, salesmen, and adventurers— who suddenly appeared in their world. "The figurative style was a form of social commentary," Ortiz said. "They captured in clay the images of all the crazy, nonnative people who were passing through the area at that time. Those crazier pieces and the tradition of pottery as social commentary really leave the board wide open for me as an artist." Ortiz and other Cochiti potters have revived this tradition for the 21st century.

Around 1984, Bob Gallegos, an Albuquerque collector, showed the young Ortiz his collection of 1800s Cochiti pottery. Ortiz couldn't believe how similar the 19th-century pottery was to his own work. He had never seen these pieces before.

=== Fashion ===
For a 2003 collaboration with designer Donna Karan, he developed boldly patterned textiles based on his graphic decorative painting. Three years later he established Indigene, his own fashion line. In 2017, Ortiz collaborated with Smithsonian National Museum of the American Indian in designing jewelry pieces inspired by Cochiti art forms.

== Exhibitions ==
Select exhibitions
Date	Name	Location	Type	Notes
2024-2026	Future Imaginaries: Indigenous Art, Fashion, Technology	Autry Museum of the American West	Group exhibition	Installation including ceramics, video, and photos
2019 – 2020	Virgil Ortiz: Odyssey of the Venutian Soldiers Exhibition	Montclair Art Museum	Solo exhibition	
2018 – 2019	Revolution – Rise Against the Invasion	Colorado Springs Fine Art Center at Colorado College	Solo exhibition	Involved a large scale video projection made in collaboration with Ideum, showcasing a narrative story about the 2180 AD second Pueblo Revolt. Combining art, fashion, video, and film.
2015 – 2016	Revolt 1680/2180: Virgil Ortiz	Denver Art Museum	Solo exhibition	Featuring graphic murals and ceramic figurines.
2006	Virgil Ortiz: La Renaissance Indigene	National Museum of the American Indian	Solo exhibition	

== See also ==
- List of Native American artists
- Lisa Holt and Harlan Reano, Holt is Ortiz's niece and a Native American potter.
