= Cochiti, New Mexico =

Cochiti, New Mexico Kotyit (Eastern Keres)
- CDP
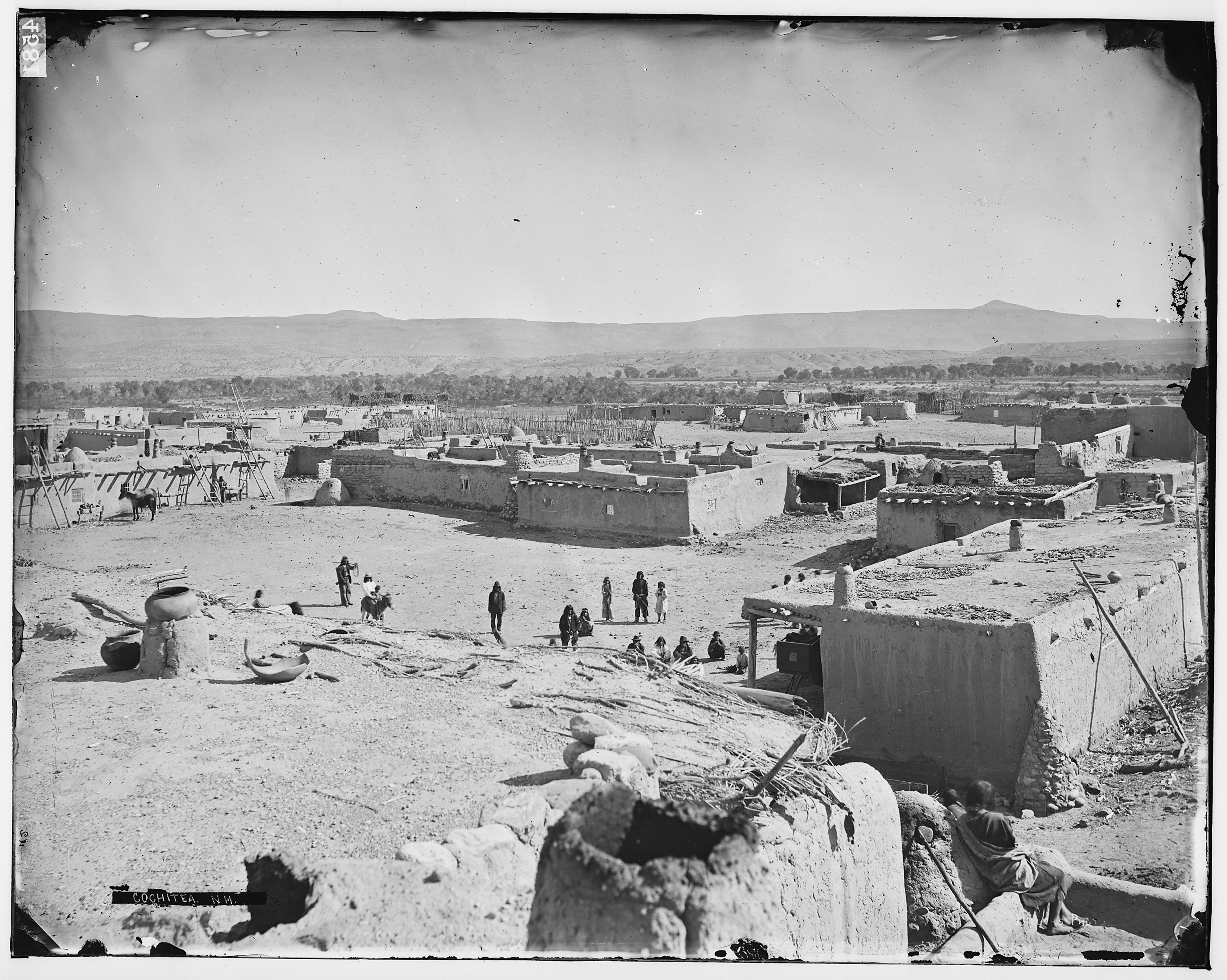
- Cochiti Pueblo between c. 1871-c. 1907

- Location of Cochiti
- Country: United States
- State: New Mexico
- County: Sandoval

Area
  - Total: 0.78 sq mi (2.02 km^{2})
  - Land: 0.78 sq mi (2.02 km^{2})
  - Water: 0 sq mi (0.00 km^{2})
- Elevation: 5,276 ft (1,608 m)

Population (2020)
  - Total: 479
  - Density: 614.9/sq mi (237.41/km^{2})
- Time zone: UTC-7 (Mountain (MST))
  - Summer (DST): UTC-6 (MDT)
- ZIP code: 87072
- Area code: 505
- FIPS code: 35-16560
- GNIS feature ID: 1867383
- Cochiti Pueblo
- U.S. National Register of Historic Places
- U.S. Historic district
- NM State Register of Cultural Properties
- Location within New Mexico Location within the United States
- Nearest city: Cochiti, New Mexico
- Coordinates: 35°36′32″N 106°20′41″W
- Area: 61 acres (25 ha)
- Built: 1250
- Architect: Fr. Juan de Rozas
- Architectural style: Pueblo
- NRHP reference No.: 74001205
- NMSRCP No.: 234

Significant dates
- Added to NRHP: November 20, 1974
- Designated NMSRCP: February 1, 1972

Cochiti (/ˈkoʊtʃəti/; Eastern Keresan: Kotyit [kʰocʰi̥tʰ]; Western Keresan K’úutìim’é [kʼúːtʰìːm̰é], Navajo: Tǫ́ʼgaaʼ /tʰṍʔkɑ̀ːʔ/) is a census-designated place (CDP) in Sandoval County, New Mexico, United States. The Pueblo of Cochiti is a federally recognized tribe of Pueblo people.

A historic pueblo of the Cochiti people, a Keres people, it is part of the Albuquerque metropolitan area. As of the 2020 census, Cochiti had a population of 479. Located 22 miles (35 km) southwest of Santa Fe, the community is listed as a historic district on the National Register of Historic Places.

== Cochiti pueblo and Cochiti people ==
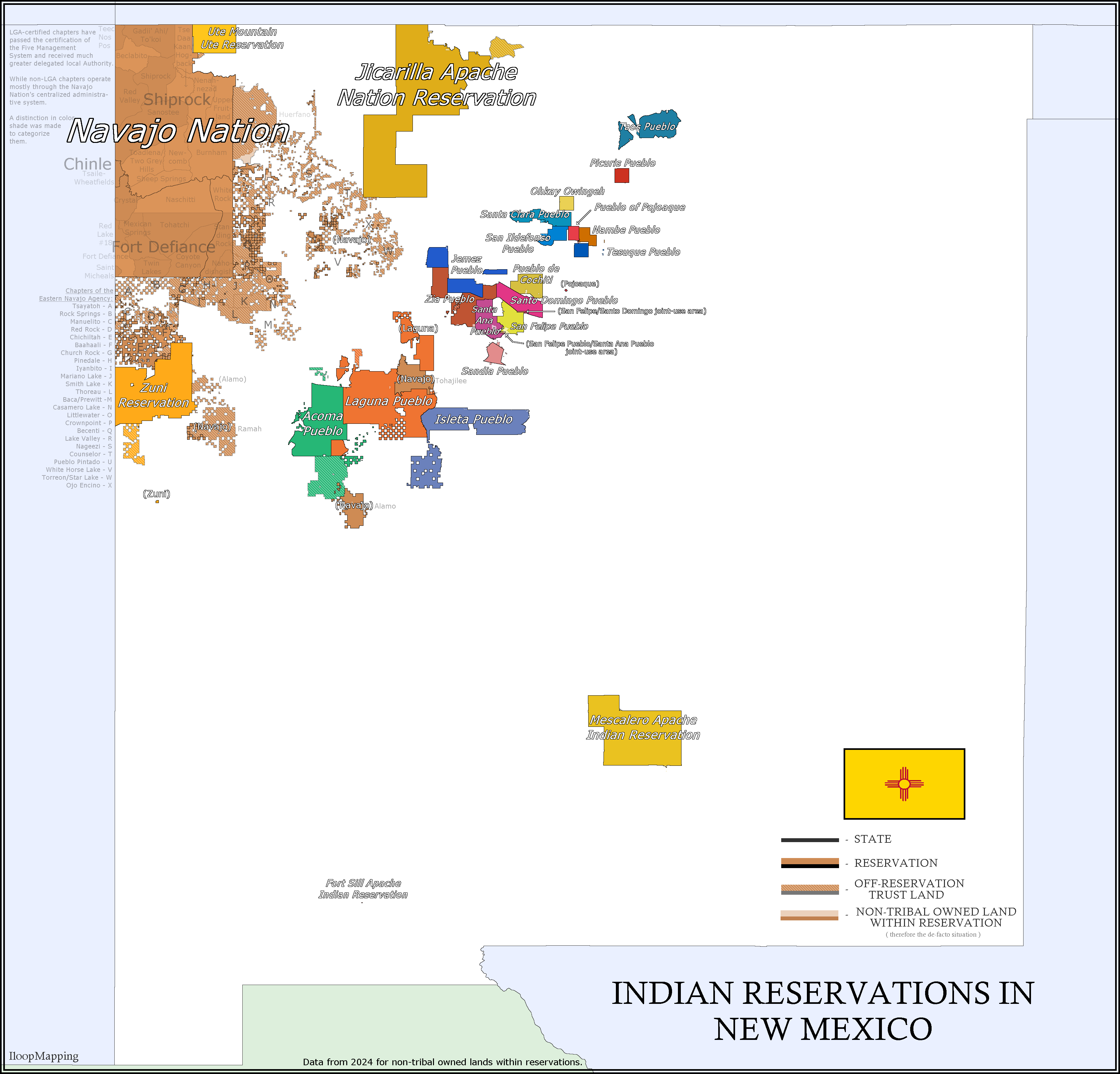
Map of the Cochiti and neighboring tribes (In golden).

The Pueblo administers 53,779 acres (217.64 km^{2}) of reservation land and works closely with the Bureau of Land Management who has jurisdiction over Kasha-Katuwe Tent Rocks National Monument.

The Pueblo celebrates the annual feast day for its patron saint, San Buenaventura, on July 14.

== Government ==
The administration of the Pueblo of Cochiti in 2025 is: Governor: Joseph B. Herrera Lieutenant Governor: Jeff M. Suina

== Language ==
The Cochiti speak Eastern Keres, a dialect of the Keresan language, which is a language isolate. In the early 21st century, the Keres Children's Learning Center, an independent Keres immersion school, was founded to aid with preservation of their language and culture. It has added grades since its founding.

The Western Keresan name for the people of Cochiti Pueblo is K’úutìim’é, translating to "People from the Mountains".

== Demographics ==
Historical population
Census	Pop.	Note	%±
2020	479		—
U.S. Decennial Census

At the 2010 census, there were 528 people, 157 households and 127 families residing in the CDP. The population density was 440 inhabitants per square mile (170/km^{2}). There were 178 housing units at an average density of 149.9 units per square mile (57.9 units/km^{2}). The racial makeup of the CDP was 95.1% Native American, 1.5% White, 1.3% from other races, and 2.1% from two or more races. Hispanic or Latino of any race were 6.6% of the population.

There were 157 households, of which 28% had children under the age of 18 living with them, 40.8% were married couples living together, 29.3% had a female householder with no husband present, and 19.1% were non-families. 18.5% of all households were made up of individuals, and 9.0% had someone living alone who was 65 years of age or older. The average household size was 3.36 and the average family size was 3.76.

31.8% of the population were under the age of 19, 6.4% from 20 to 24, 23.8% from 25 to 44, 20.6% from 45 to 64, and 17.4% who were 65 years of age or older. The median age was 34.5 years.

In the 2000 census, the median household income was $31,875 and the median family income was $37,500. Males had a median income of $19,231 compared with $21,641 for females. The per capita income for the CDP was $9,153. About 21.4% of families and 20.9% of the population were below the poverty line, including 21.3% of those under age 18 and 11.8% of those age 65 or over.

== History ==
The Cochiti people are thought to be descended from the Ancestral Puebloans (formerly known as the Anasazi). The ancestors of the Cochiti people, living in cliff dwellings at Rito de los Frijoles in present-day Bandelier National Monument, divided into two groups. One was located in the pueblo of Katishtya (later called San Felipe pueblo) in the south and the other was located in Potrero Viejo, one of the finger mesas of the Pajarito Plateau in northern central New Mexico. Approximately 12 miles northwest of the present-day Cochiti Pueblo, a temporary pueblo known as Hanut Cochiti had been established.

In 1598, Spanish conquistador, Juan de Oñate came to Cochiti Pueblo. At first, the Spaniards admired and respected the Pueblo Peoples for their Spanish-like farming techniques and villages, viewing them as equals, and opening trade. As time went on, the Spaniards attempted to assimilate Cochiti people (and other tribes) into New Spanish society. They were forced to pay taxes in crops, cotton, and work. The Spanish Catholic missionaries attacked their religion and renamed the Pueblos with Catholic saints’ names and began a program of church construction, such as the San Buenaventura Mission at Cochiti, routinely torturing the tribes for practicing their traditional religion, and forcing them into labor and/or slavery.

The Cochiti pueblo people took part in the Pueblo Revolt of 1680, an uprising of the Native Americans against the Spaniards. When Spanish Governor Antonio de Otermin reconquered New Mexico, the tribe retreated with the other Keresan tribes of San Felipe and Santo Domingo (now called Kewa) to the Potrero Viejo. The Cochiti people remained at Potrero Viejo until 1693 when they were forced to flee Spanish Governor Don Diego de Vargas and his troops.

== Geography ==
According to the United States Census Bureau, the CDP has a total area of 1.2 square miles (3.1 km^{2}), all land.

=== Climate ===
According to the Köppen Climate Classification system, Cochiti has a cold semi-arid climate, abbreviated "BSk" on climate maps. The hottest temperature recorded in Cochiti was 108 °F (42.2 °C) on July 12, 2020 and June 17, 2025, while the coldest temperature recorded was −14 °F (−25.6 °C) on December 10, 1978, and February 3, 2011.

Climate data for Cochiti Dam, New Mexico, 1991–2020 normals, extremes 1975–present
Month	Jan	Feb	Mar	Apr	May	Jun	Jul	Aug	Sep	Oct	Nov	Dec	Year
Record high °F (°C)	67 (19)	78 (26)	94 (34)	89 (32)	99 (37)	108 (42)	108 (42)	105 (41)	102 (39)	94 (34)	81 (27)	69 (21)	108 (42)
Mean maximum °F (°C)	60.3 (15.7)	67.1 (19.5)	76.2 (24.6)	83.2 (28.4)	91.6 (33.1)	99.8 (37.7)	100.8 (38.2)	97.5 (36.4)	94.1 (34.5)	85.6 (29.8)	71.8 (22.1)	61.4 (16.3)	102.2 (39.0)
Mean daily maximum °F (°C)	50.0 (10.0)	55.7 (13.2)	64.0 (17.8)	71.4 (21.9)	80.9 (27.2)	92.0 (33.3)	94.1 (34.5)	91.8 (33.2)	85.6 (29.8)	73.6 (23.1)	60.3 (15.7)	49.8 (9.9)	72.4 (22.5)
Daily mean °F (°C)	35.0 (1.7)	39.8 (4.3)	46.9 (8.3)	54.0 (12.2)	63.6 (17.6)	74.0 (23.3)	77.5 (25.3)	75.5 (24.2)	68.7 (20.4)	56.6 (13.7)	44.2 (6.8)	35.1 (1.7)	55.9 (13.3)
Mean daily minimum °F (°C)	20.0 (−6.7)	23.8 (−4.6)	29.8 (−1.2)	36.6 (2.6)	46.3 (7.9)	55.9 (13.3)	60.9 (16.1)	59.2 (15.1)	51.9 (11.1)	39.5 (4.2)	28.2 (−2.1)	20.4 (−6.4)	39.4 (4.1)
Mean minimum °F (°C)	9.4 (−12.6)	13.0 (−10.6)	17.7 (−7.9)	25.0 (−3.9)	34.5 (1.4)	47.0 (8.3)	53.7 (12.1)	52.5 (11.4)	41.5 (5.3)	26.6 (−3.0)	15.5 (−9.2)	8.6 (−13.0)	4.9 (−15.1)
Record low °F (°C)	−4 (−20)	−14 (−26)	3 (−16)	11 (−12)	18 (−8)	34 (1)	40 (4)	42 (6)	30 (−1)	13 (−11)	−12 (−24)	−14 (−26)	−14 (−26)
Average precipitation inches (mm)	0.62 (16)	0.50 (13)	0.72 (18)	0.62 (16)	0.83 (21)	0.72 (18)	2.03 (52)	1.72 (44)	1.41 (36)	1.26 (32)	0.72 (18)	0.64 (16)	11.79 (300)
Average snowfall inches (cm)	2.1 (5.3)	1.8 (4.6)	0.8 (2.0)	0.1 (0.25)	0.0 (0.0)	0.0 (0.0)	0.0 (0.0)	0.0 (0.0)	0.0 (0.0)	0.0 (0.0)	0.6 (1.5)	2.8 (7.1)	8.2 (20.75)
Average precipitation days (≥ 0.01 in)	4.0	3.7	4.2	4.0	4.9	4.5	10.1	10.5	5.7	5.8	3.7	3.7	64.8
Average snowy days (≥ 0.1 in)	1.0	0.6	0.2	0.0	0.0	0.0	0.0	0.0	0.0	0.0	0.3	1.1	3.2
Source 1: NOAA
Source 2: National Weather Service

== Art ==
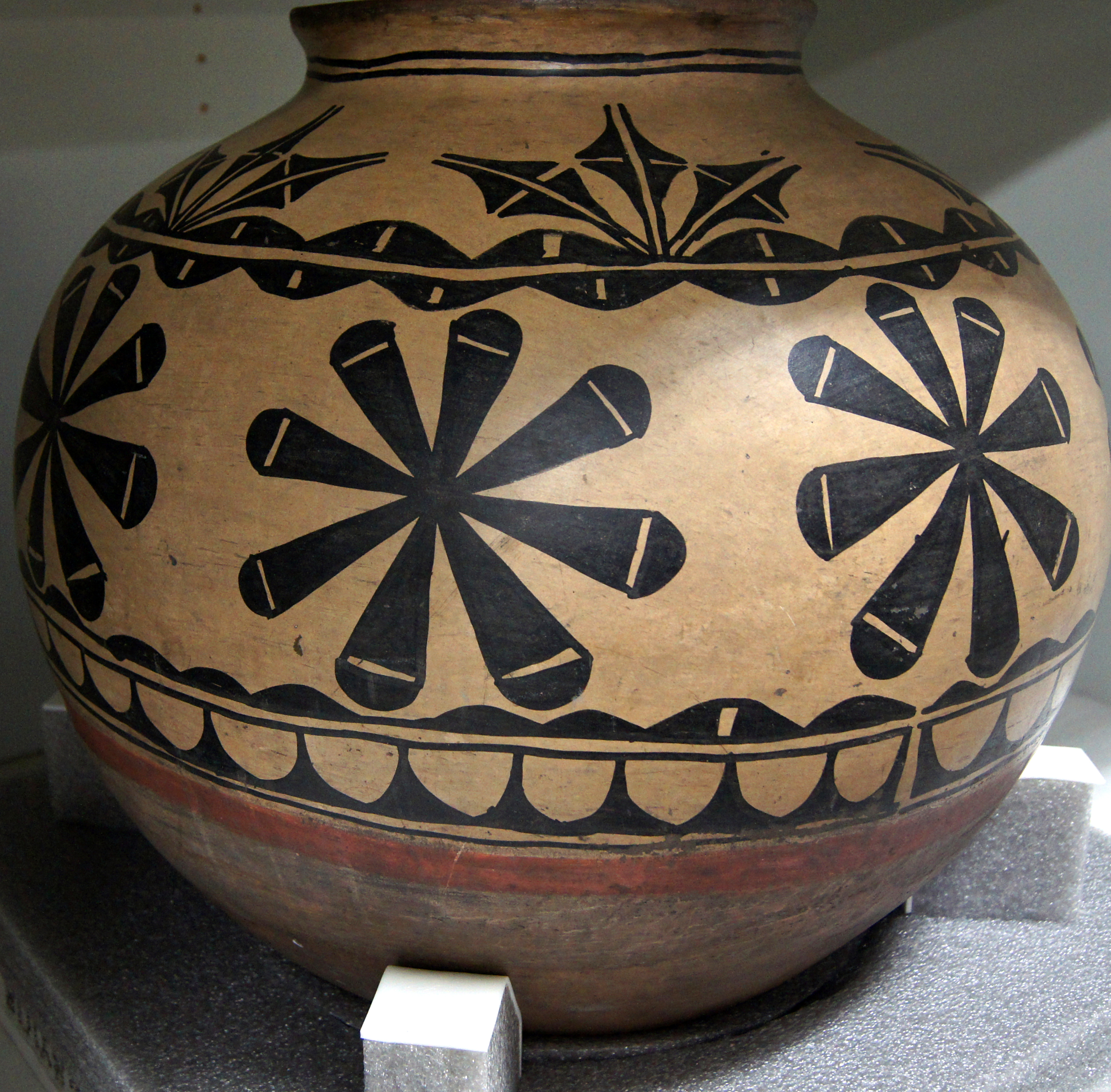
Cochiti Pot with black motif on buff clay body

Potters of Cochiti and Kewa Pueblo (formerly Santo Domingo Pueblo) have made traditional pots for centuries, developing styles for different purposes and expressing deep beliefs in their designs. Since the early decades of the 20th century, these pots have been appreciated by a wider audience outside the pueblos. Continuing to use traditional techniques, in the late 20th and early 21st centuries, potters have also expanded their designs and repertoire in pottery, which has an international market.

== Education ==
It is in the Bernalillo Public Schools district, which operates Cochiti Elementary & Middle Schools in nearby Peña Blanca, and Bernalillo High School.

== Notable people from Cochiti Pueblo ==
- Helen Cordero, storyteller and pottery
- The Herrera-Ortiz family of Cochiti Pueblo is known for their traditional pottery, as well as other forms of art.
  - Laurencita Herrera (1912–1984), storyteller pottery and vessels
  - Virgil Ortiz (born 1969), potter and designer
  - Inez Ortiz (1960–2008), traditional Cochiti potter
  - Lisa Holt (born 1980), Cochiti potter with modern influence
- The Montoya-Peña family of both Cochiti Pueblo and San Ildefonso Pueblo, known for their painting
  - Martina Vigil Montoya (1856–1916)
  - Tonita Peña (1893–1949), painter
  - Joe Herrera (1923–2001), painter
- Diego Romero (born 1964), pottery and printmaking
- Mateo Romero (born 1966), painter

== In popular culture ==
In 1969, a documentary film about a Native American boy's life on the Cochiti pueblo was made for Sesame Street's second season (1970–1971), aired on December 9, 1970. Subjects it covered included a game of shinny, making tortillas, and making necklaces out of corn for summertime sale to tourists.

== Gallery ==
Cochiti man, 1912.

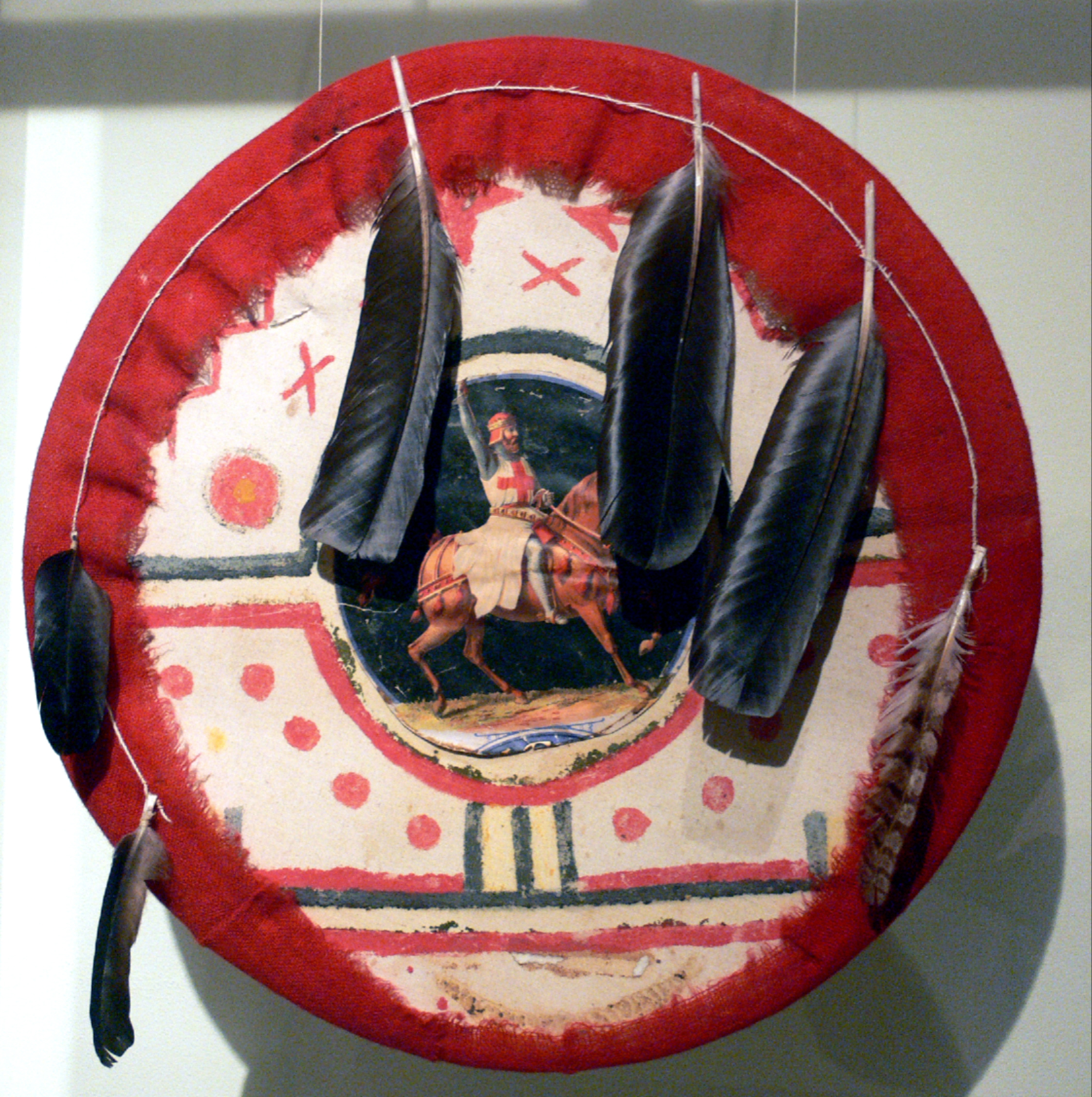
Cochiti Pueblo Ceremonial shield, made before 1883

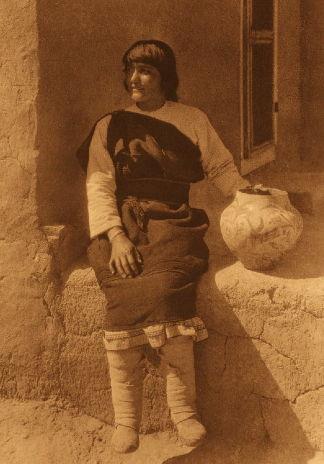
Carolina Quintana (Aiyowitsa) of Cochiti Pueblo, photographed by Edward Curtis

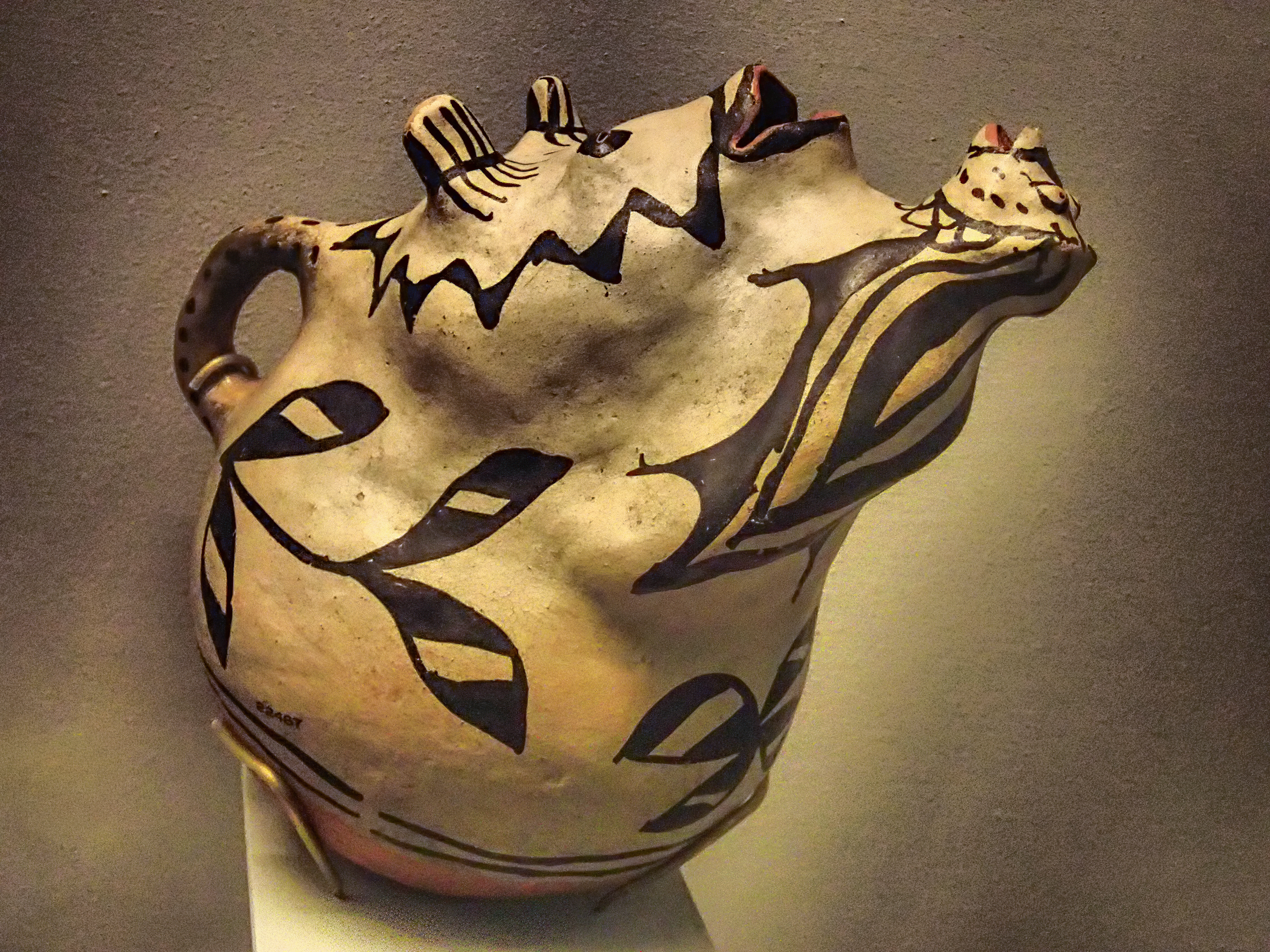
Animorphic effigy jar produced by the people of the Cochiti Pueblo at The Field Museum in Chicago, IL

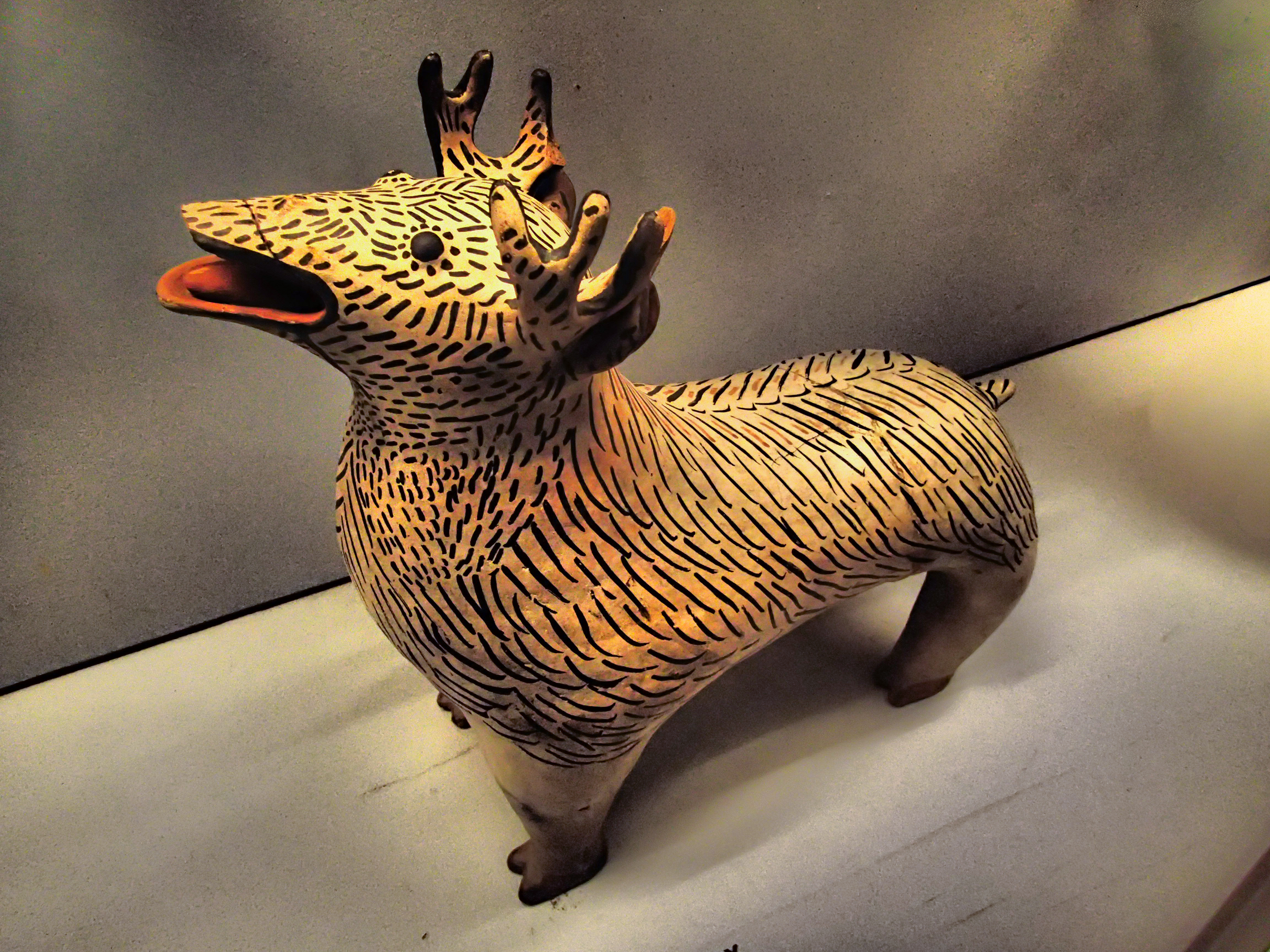
Effigy of a deer produced by the people of the Cochiti Pueblo at The Field Museum in Chicago, IL

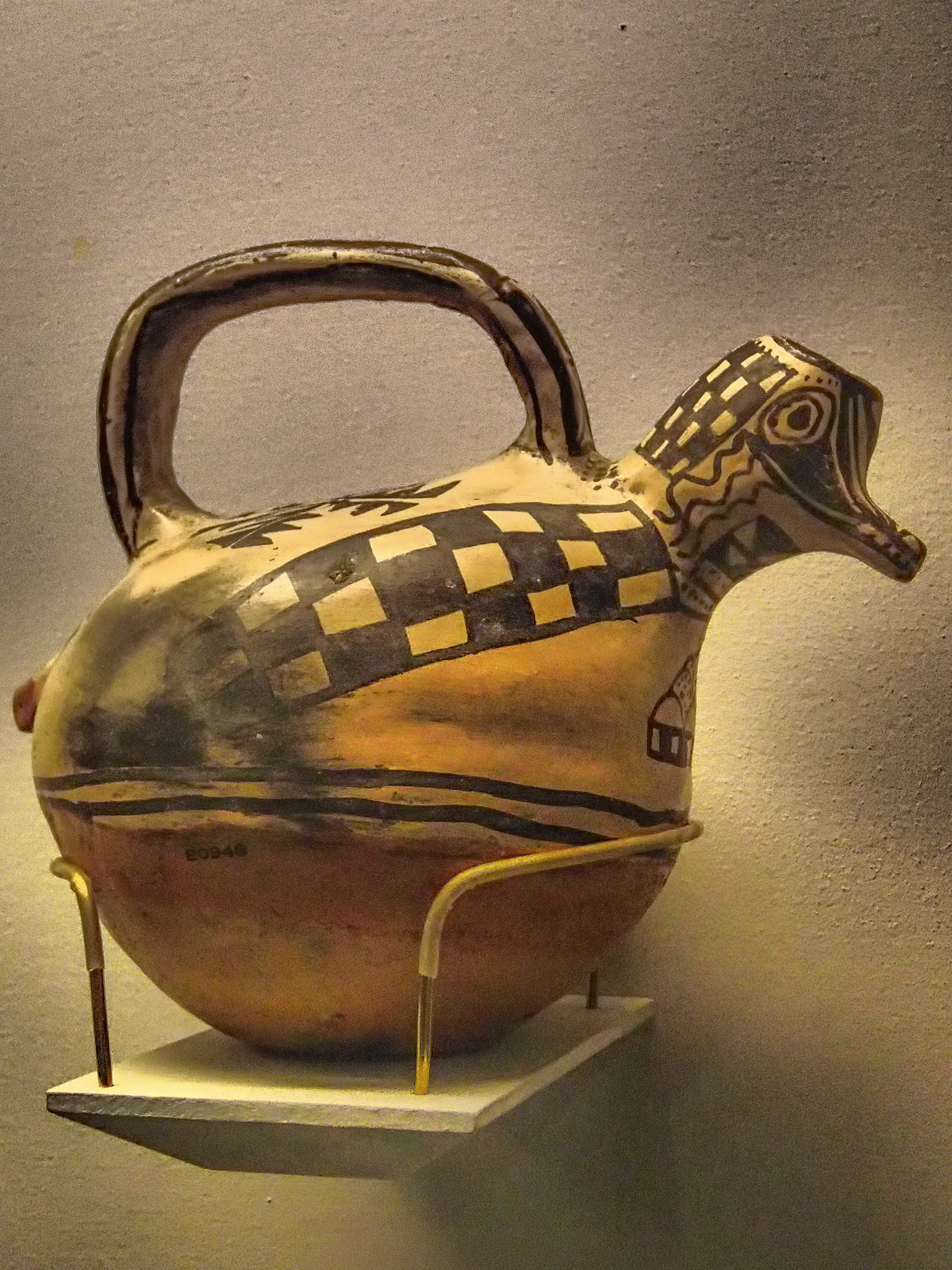
Animorphic effigy jar produced by the people of the Cochiti Pueblo at The Field Museum in Chicago, IL

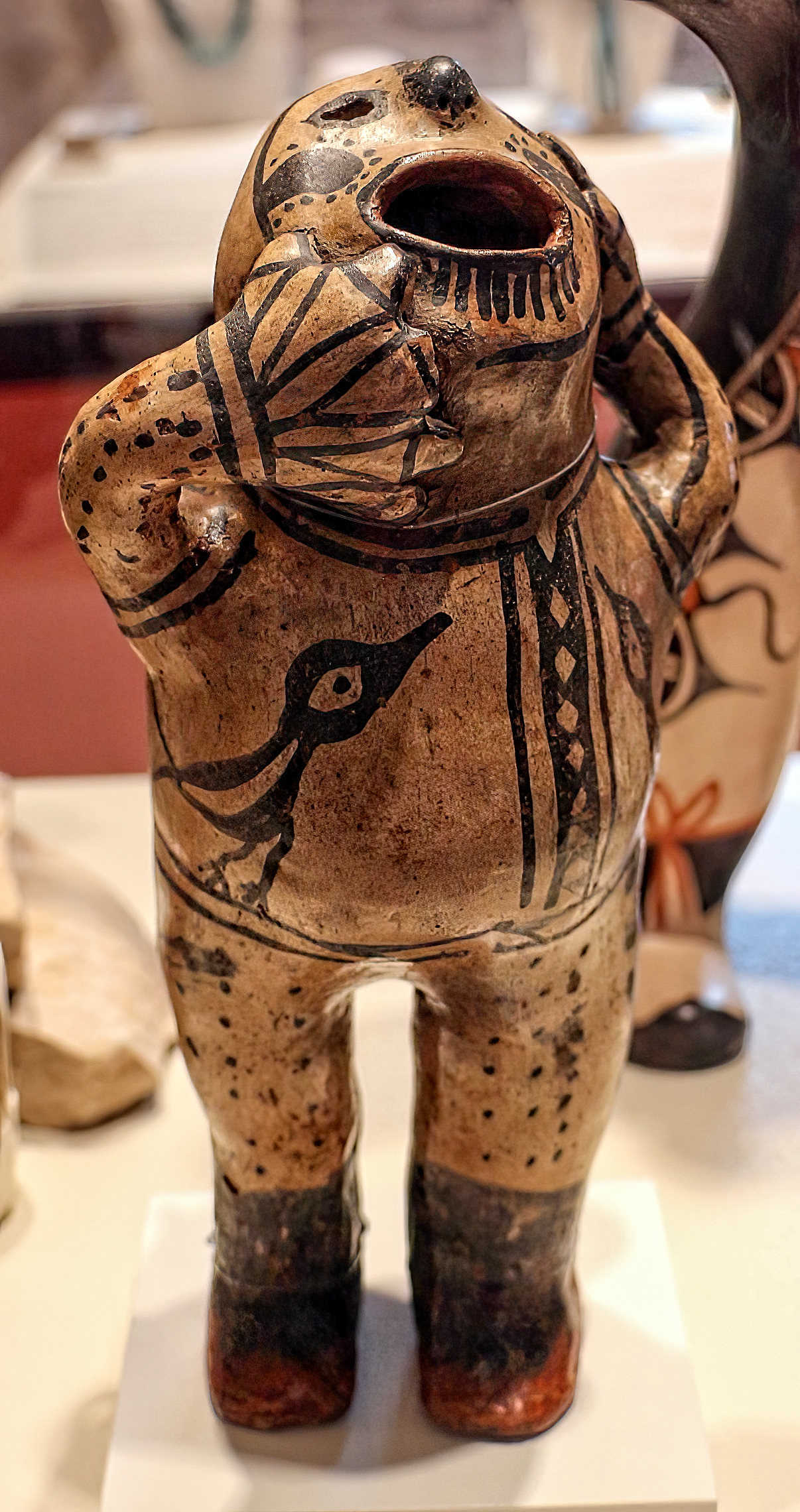
Humanoid ceramic figurine produced by the people of the Cochiti pueblo.

== See also ==
- Cochiti Dam
- Kasha-Katuwe Tent Rocks National Monument
- National Register of Historic Places listings in Sandoval County, New Mexico
