= Lisa Holt and Harlan Reano =

External images
- Harlan Reano and Lisa Holt
- Pueblo superhero figurine

Lisa Holt (born 1980, Cochiti Pueblo, New Mexico) and Harlan Reano (born 1978, Kewa Pueblo, New Mexico) are a husband-and-wife team of Pueblo potters and artists from northern New Mexico. They have been making pottery together in 1999, they use traditional Cochiti pottery techniques and create modern work.

== About ==
Holt and Reano have been making pottery together since 1999. At first, Holt made the pots and Reano painted them. They now share the pottery making; Reano still does all the painting. They first made figurines inspired by the old Cochiti tradition of human and animal forms. They use Cochiti clay and natural paints for their work, and fire their pottery outdoors with cedar wood.

More recently, they make pots, jars, and figurines with a more contemporary feel, influenced by the work of Holt's uncle, the avant-garde potter and designer, Virgil Ortiz.

Holt and Reano's work was featured in the 25th Smithsonian Institution Craft Show in 2007. Smithsonian magazine in 20107 ran a photo of their "Pueblo Fire Warrior" figurine. "He's a superhero we came up with," they said.

Holt and Reano's works are in various permanent museum collections, including the National Museum of the American Indian, the Museum of Indian Arts & Culture, Peabody Essex Museum, and others.

Their piece, Untitled pot, was acquired by the Smithsonian American Art Museum as part of the Renwick Gallery's 50th Anniversary Campaign.

=== Lisa Holt ===
Lisa Holt is from Cochiti Pueblo and is the granddaughter of potter Seferina Ortiz (1931–2007), who was her mentor. She also learned from her mother, Juanita Inez Ortiz, and her uncle, Virgil Ortiz. She is of the Herrera family, of Pueblo potters in New Mexico, whose work is often found in art collections and in art museums.

=== Harlan Reano ===
Harlan Reano is half Kewa Pueblo (formerly known as Santo Domingo Pueblo) on his mother's side. He also has learned potting from his mother-in-law, Juanita Inez Ortiz.

== Awards ==
- 2012 – Best of Classification in Pottery at Santa Fe Indian Market
- 2011 – Heard Museum Indian Fair & Market, four awards: Best of Classification in Pottery, first place in traditional pottery, two judge's awards.
- 2010 – Heard Museum Indian Fair & Market, Best of Classification in Pottery
