= Detrola Radio & Television Corporation =

- Industry: Radio manufacturing
- Founded: 1931 in Detroit, Michigan, USA
- Founder: John J. Ross
- Defunct: 1948
- Fate: Car radio business sold to Motorola in 1948. Crosley Radio revived the name in 2016 for a reproduction radio.

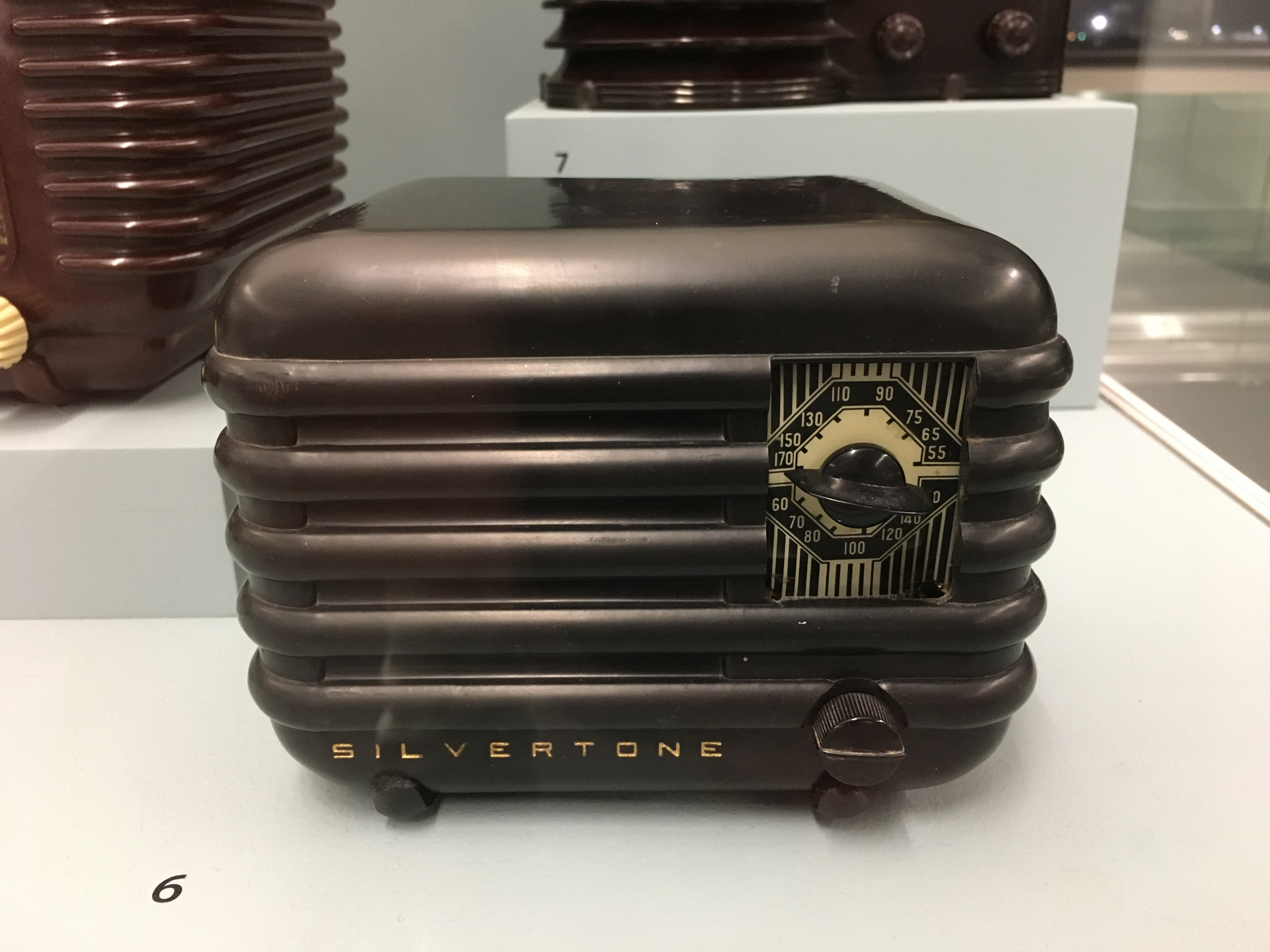
Detrola Silvertone 6402 (1937) radio, made of Bakelite

The Detrola Radio & Television Corporation was an American manufacturer of radios. Founded in Detroit in 1931 by John J. Ross, Detrola became a brand of affordable radios in the midst of the Great Depression. They may well have been the world's most prolific manufacturer of private brand radios for department stores and small retailers, likely building sets under more than 100 different brand names. The company also manufactured large quantities of radios under the Truetone name for Western Auto and Silvertone brand for Sears. Popular models were the "Super Pee Wee" and "Catalin 281" known for being cheap economy sets. At the company's height in 1936, Detrola claimed to be "The sixth largest radio manufacturer in the United States" and had about 1,000 employees, and sales representatives in many cities and foreign countries.

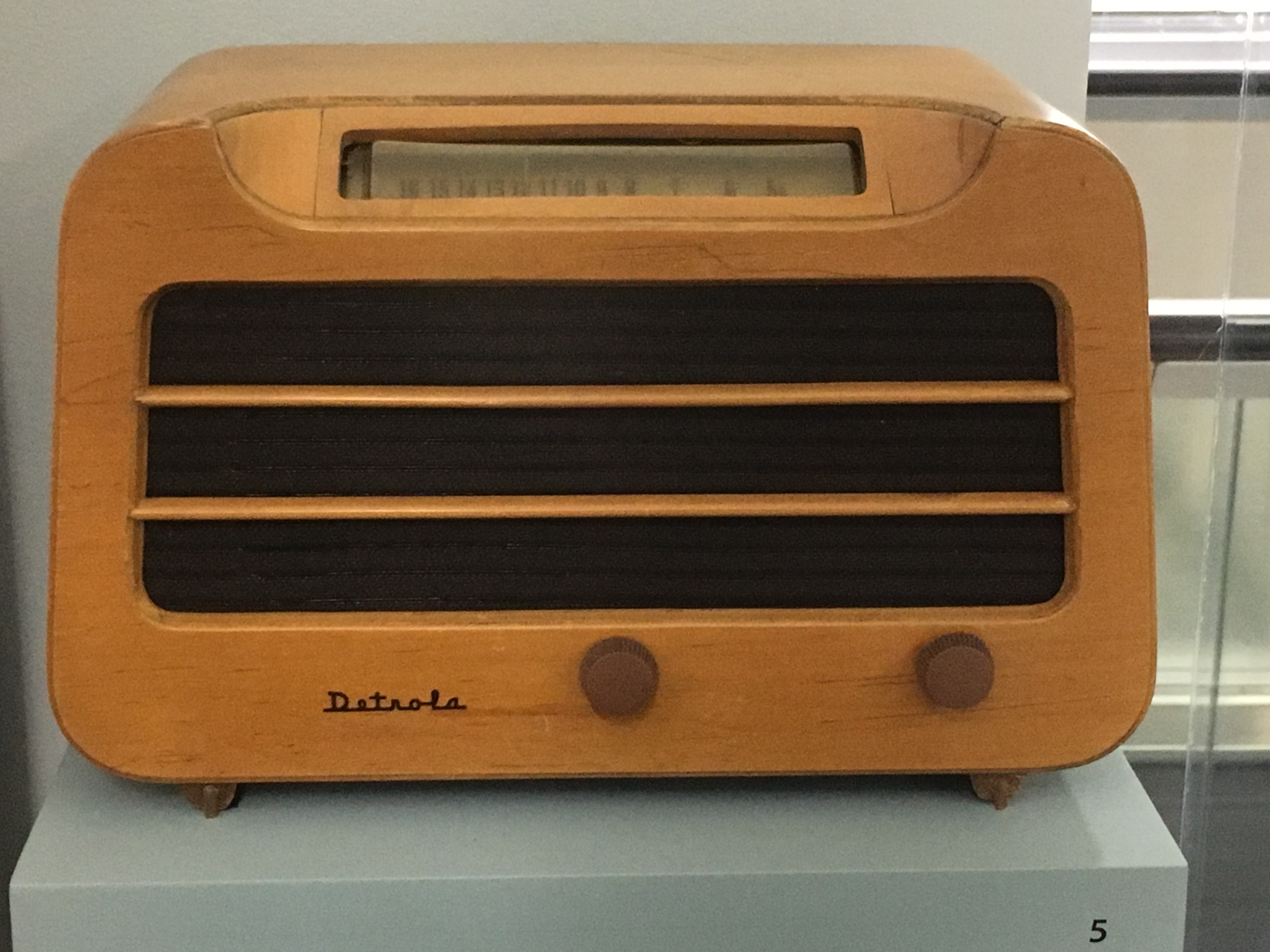
Detrola Model 579 (1946) radio, made of plywood

In 1941, Detrola became a supplier of war supplies, most notably land mine detectors, aircraft radios, and electrical panels for ships. Ross sold out his interests in the company to the International Machine Tool Company, which was a conglomerate led by C. Russell Feldmann. After World War II, Detrola resumed civilian production but decided not to branch off into the television set market. However, production costs became high and there were serious union issues. The company struggled to keep up with larger manufacturers. The company sold off its thriving auto radio manufacturing business to Motorola in the summer of 1948, then stopped all manufacturing later in 1948.

As of 2016, Crosley Radio has revived the Detrola namesake for a reproduction radio.
