= Storyteller (pottery) =

Pueblo people art form

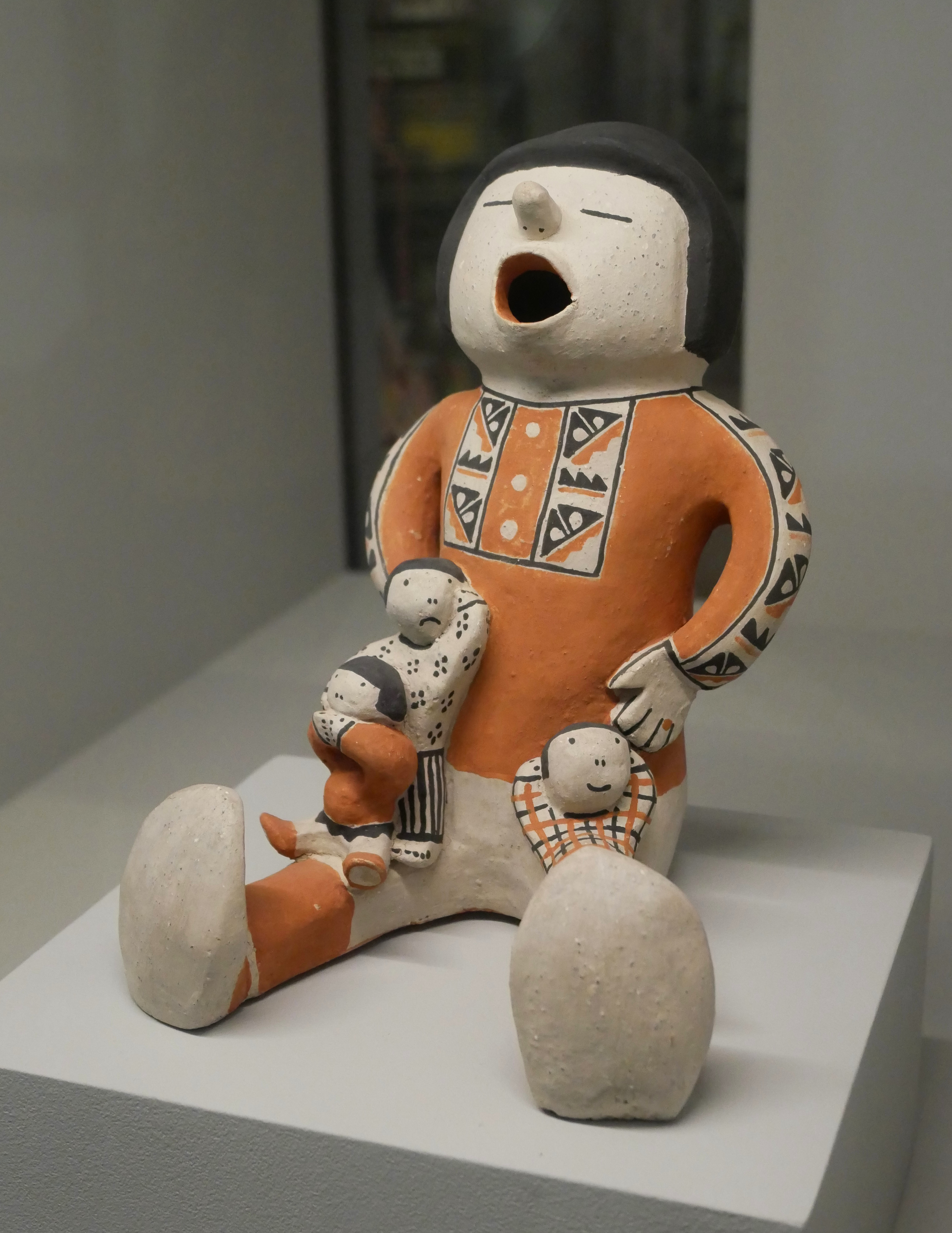
A late 20th-century storyteller figurine from New Mexico on display in the Horniman Museum, London

A Storyteller Doll is a clay figurine made by the Pueblo people of New Mexico. The first contemporary storyteller was made by Helen Cordero of the Cochiti Pueblo. In 1964, Folk art collector, Alexander Girard, had asked Helen Quintana Cordero to modify her Singing Mother figures into being larger and surrounded by children. The request design sparked memories of her grandfather telling traditional stories of the Pueblo Indians. Her first storyteller figure represented her grandfather, Santiago Quintana, who was a tribal storyteller. It looks like a figure of a storyteller, usually a man or a woman and its mouth is always open. It is surrounded by figures of children and other things, who represent those who are listening to the storyteller. The motif is based on the traditional "singing mother" motif which depicts a woman with her mouth open holding one or two children.

Pueblo Cochiti clothes usually have earthy colors, browns, reds, oranges, and other defining features. Each pueblo village has their own design; sometimes man, woman, or animal. Other cultures around the world, especially in South and Central America, adopted the Storyteller Doll to acknowledge their own storytelling traditions. Common elements of the storyteller doll clothes are their traditional clothing patterns and jewelry motifs, usually Squash blossom necklaces, moccasins and hair tied in butterfly knots. However the styles differ depending on the tribe. Other garments that appear often is headwear, like a tableta headdress, clips, blankets draped over the head are also a popular design. As time passed storyteller dolls have become collector items throughout the world.

== See also ==
- Mary Ellen Toya
