= Helen Cordero =

Cochiti Pueblo potter

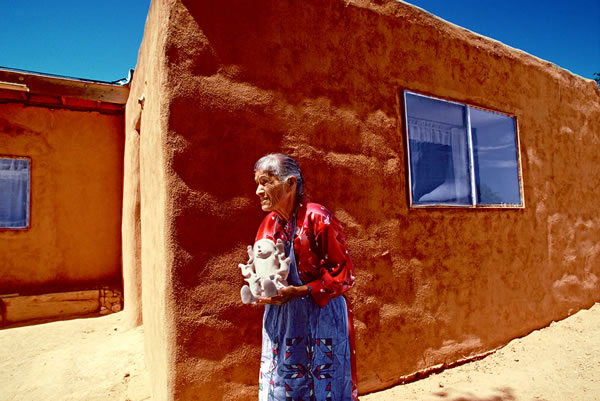
- Cordero in 1986
- Born: Helen Quintano; June 15, 1915; Cochiti Pueblo, New Mexico, U.S.
- Died: July 24, 1994 (aged 79)
- Occupation: Traditional potter
- Known for: Storyteller pottery figurines
- Spouse: George Cordero
- Children: 5
- Awards: Santa Fe Living Treasure, 1985; National Heritage Fellow, 1986

Helen Cordero (June 15, 1915 – July 24, 1994) was a Cochiti Pueblo potter from Cochiti, New Mexico. She was renowned for her storyteller pottery figurines, a motif she invented, based upon the traditional "singing mother" motif.

== Early work ==
She first learned to create leatherwork, then in the 1950s started creating pottery birds and animals that her husband painted. It is said that Helen's aunt suggested clay as a medium over the more expensive leather. She also recommended figures after the early attempts by Helen at bowls and jars were misshapen.

== Style and materials ==
Cordero "followed a traditional way of life including digging her own clay and preparing her own pigments". She used three types of clay, all sourced near Cochiti Pueblo, and clay and plant materials for paint. Over time, Helen's finish became more refined, and she made her children separately instead of from the primary piece of clay allowing for her to vary their placement around the storyteller. As Helen's work progressed, she ultimately developed the trademark face for which her dolls are now known. Cordero had a personal connection to her work, "They're my little people. I talk to them and they're singing." This reflects the Pueblo belief that clay is living substance, and that the figurines are like living being.

== Storyteller figurines ==
The Cochiti women potters made figurines of women with children known as "Singing Mother" or Madonna, Cordero transformed this form into her Storyteller design in 1964. According to one account, she was commissioned by the Anglo designer and collector Alexander Girard to create the first Storyteller. Yet, in a 1981 article, Cordero said she created the first Storyteller on her own in 1964. "I made some more of my Storytellers with lots of children climbing on him to listen, then I took them up to the Santo Domingo Feast Day" where Alexander Girard bought them.

Alexander Girard was a patron who purchased her early work. Not long after Helen started her figurines, Gerard asked her to increase her yield and the size of her figures. This request ultimately terminated in a 250-piece Nativity set. It is suggested that Gerard also proposed Helen should fashion a larger "Singing Mother" figure. Helen mulled over the idea, and thought of her grandfather, Santiago Quintana, who she remembered as a great storyteller. Helen's grandfather would in part inspire her first Storyteller, a male figure surrounded by five grandchildren. After 1964, her family members joined her in making Storyteller figurines. She described her process:

"work outdoors in warm weather and at her kitchen table in the winter. Her husband and son drove one hundred miles to bring home the cedar wood she used to fire her pieces ... on an open iron grate behind her house."

Her Storyteller design became popular with other pottery-makers, who have created variations, including animal storytellers. By the 1990s, over 200 potters were making Storyteller figures for a booming market. To distinguish her work and to fulfill the expectations of some collectors, Helen began signing her works. After the success of the Storyteller, Helen eventually drew more from her experiences and went on to develop other types including, drummers, singing mothers, Pueblo father, and Hopi maiden.

== Personal life ==
Cordero was a lifelong resident of Cochiti Pueblo. She married Fred Cordero, an artist, drum-maker, and governor of Cochiti Pueblo, and they had four children.

== Collections ==
Cordero's work is found in the Museum of International Folk Art and the New Mexico Museum of Art in Santa Fe, New Mexico, the Museum of Texas Tech University in Lubbock, Texas, the Smithsonian American Art Museum in Washington, DC, the Heard Museum in Phoenix, the Bandelier National Monument museum in Los Alamos Co., New Mexico and the Brooklyn Museum.

== Awards and honors ==
- Cordero was honored as a Santa Fe Living Treasure in 1985.
- She was a recipient of a 1986 National Heritage Fellowship awarded by the National Endowment for the Arts, which is the United States government's highest honor in the folk and traditional arts.
- Helen Cordero Primary School, in Albuquerque, New Mexico, is named after her.
