= Maffet Ledger =

Ledger book containing 19th c. Cheyenne artwork

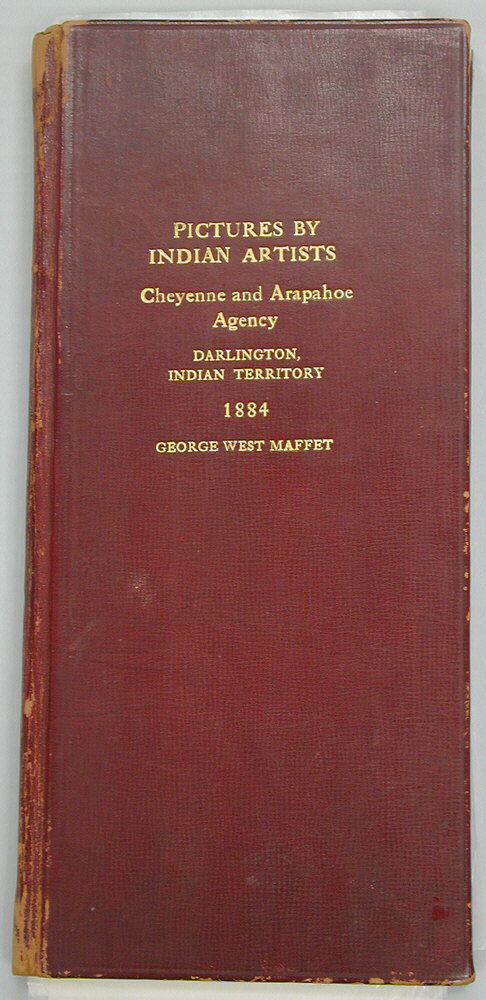
- Artist: Various; the ledger contains work by over 20 Cheyenne artists
- Year: c. 1874–81
- Location: Metropolitan Museum of Art; New York City
- Accession: 1978.412.207 (1–182)

The Maffet Ledger is a late 19th-century compilation of Cheyenne artwork. The ledger was compiled by newspaper owner George Maffet, and contains 105 drawings. The ledger is in the collection of the Metropolitan Museum of Art.

== Description ==
The Maffet Ledger contains 105 drawings attributed to around 22 different Cheyenne authors. Most of the drawings depict battle scenes between the Cheyenne, other plains tribes, and the United States Army. The compiler of the ledger, George West Maffet Sr., was an editor for The Cheyenne Transporter, a journal published in Oklahoma.

One notable contributor to the ledger was Howling Wolf.

== Gallery ==
Drawings from the Maffet Ledger
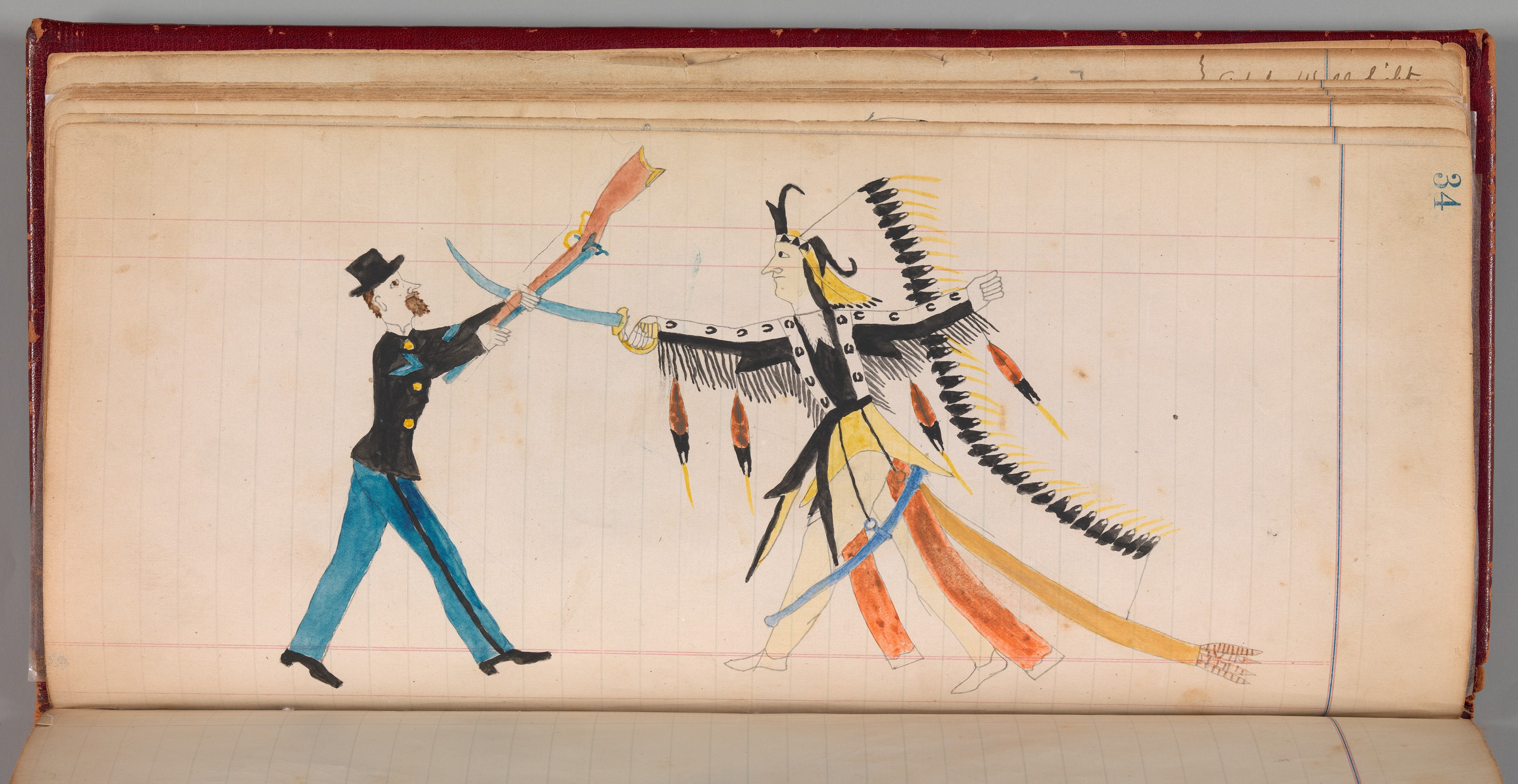
Cheyenne warrior fighting a US soldier

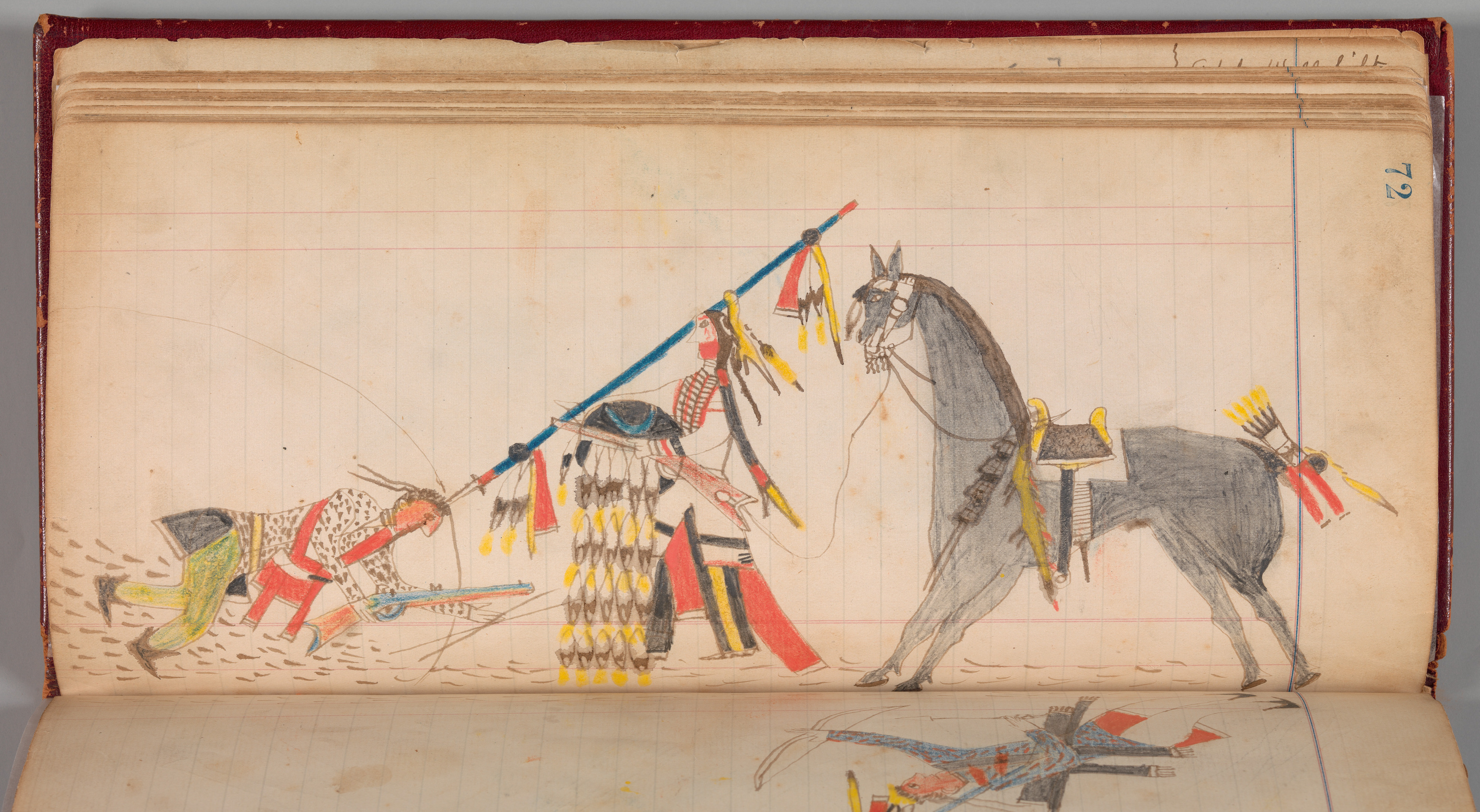
Cheyenne fighting another plains warrior

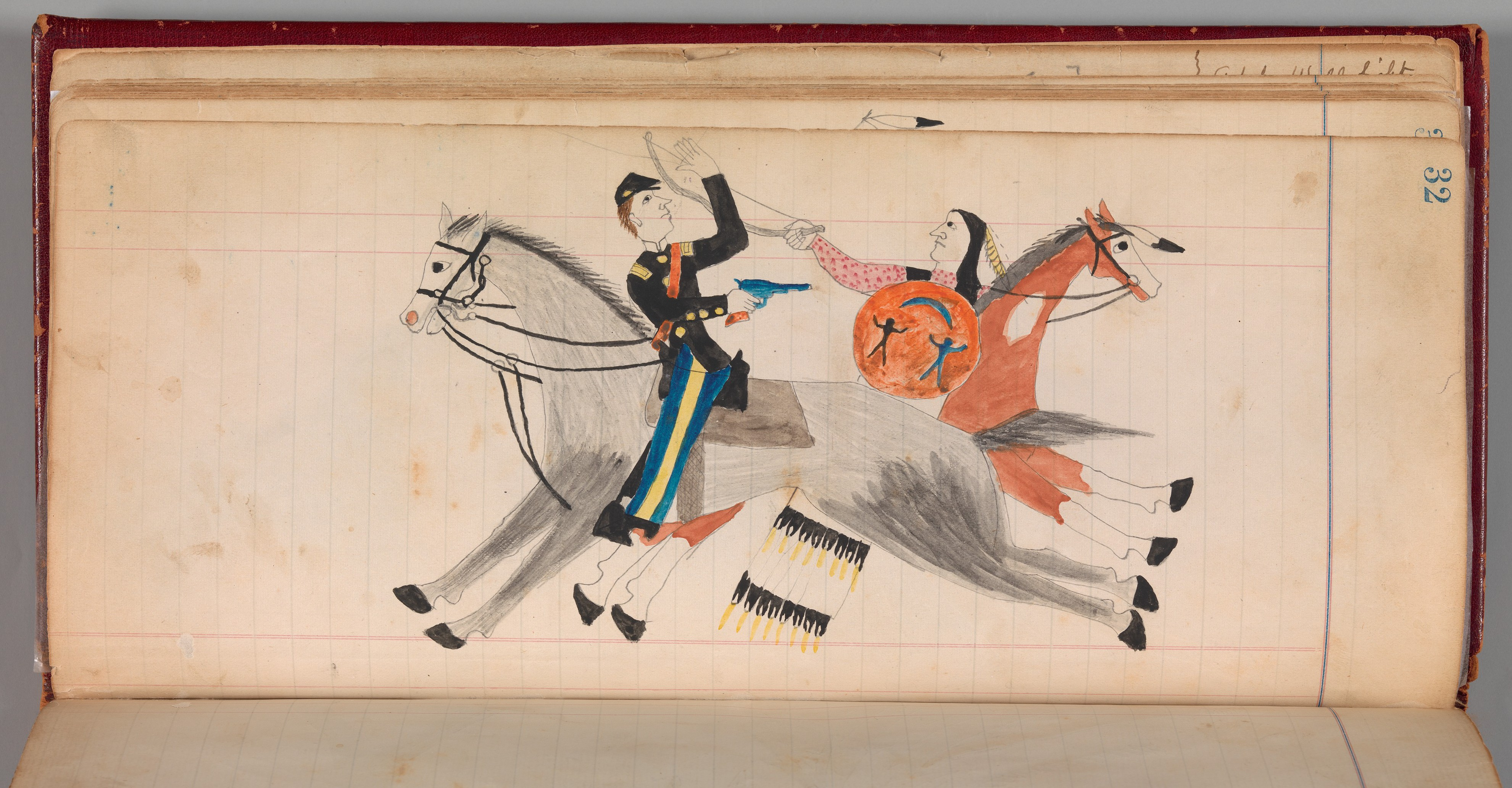
Fighting a US cavalryman

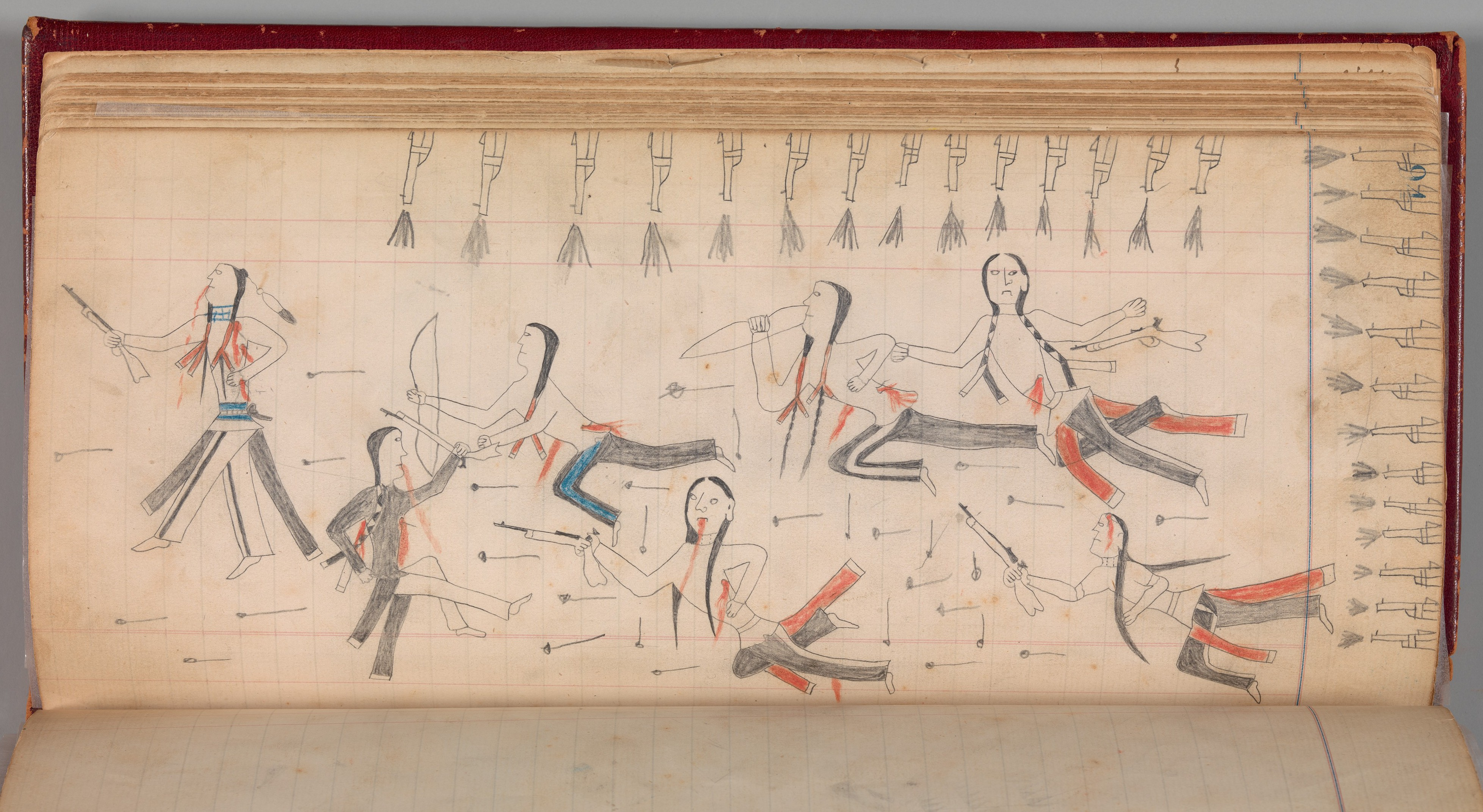
Aftermath of a battle

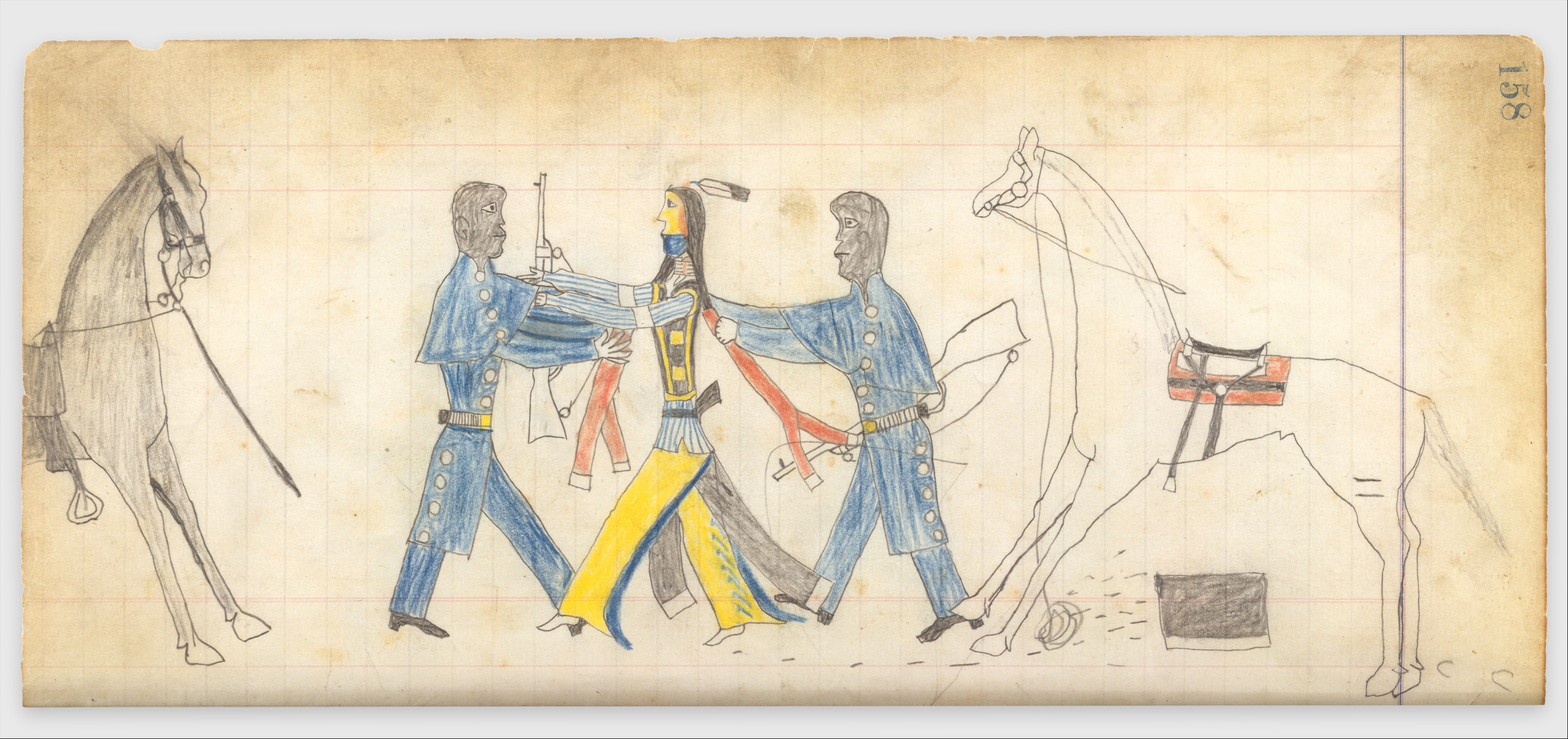
Interacting with Buffalo soldiers

== See also ==
- Ledger art
