= Chris Pappan =

Native American painter from Illinois

- Citizenship: Kaw Nation and American
- Known for: ledger art, portraiture
- Website: www.chrispappan.com

Chris Pappan (born 1971) is a Native American artist, enrolled in the Kaw Nation and of Osage and Cheyenne River Lakota descent.

== Early life and education ==
Born in Colorado Springs, Colorado, Pappan studied at the Institute of American Indian Arts, and is a self-described "Lowbrow Native" artist, with his work based on traditional ledger art.

== Art career ==
In 2011 he participated in the Heartland Reverberations exhibition at the Spencer Museum of Art along with Norman Akers, Bunky Echo-Hawk, Ryan Red Corn and Dianne Yeahquo Reyner; the same year, he was awarded the Discovery Fellowship by the Southwestern Association for Indian Arts.

In July 2014 Pappan was the featured cover artist for Native Peoples magazine; he was also awarded a Landmarks Fellowship to travel to Australia and participate in a cultural exchange with Indigenous Australians. In 2015 he presented Account Past Due: Ledger Art & Beyond at the Museum of Contemporary Native Arts. In 2016-19 the Field Museum of Natural History organized a show of his drawings and paintings called Drawing on Tradition: Kanza Artist Chris Pappan. One of his multimedia map works is discussed in the book Native Space: Geographic Strategies to Unsettle Settler Colonialism. His work is part of the permanent collections of the Spencer Museum of Art and the Museum of Contemporary Native Art.

On February 22, 2021, a Google Doodle he illustrated of Zitkala-Sa was featured in the United States to celebrate the 145th anniversary of her birth.
