= Ledger art =

Native American narrative art

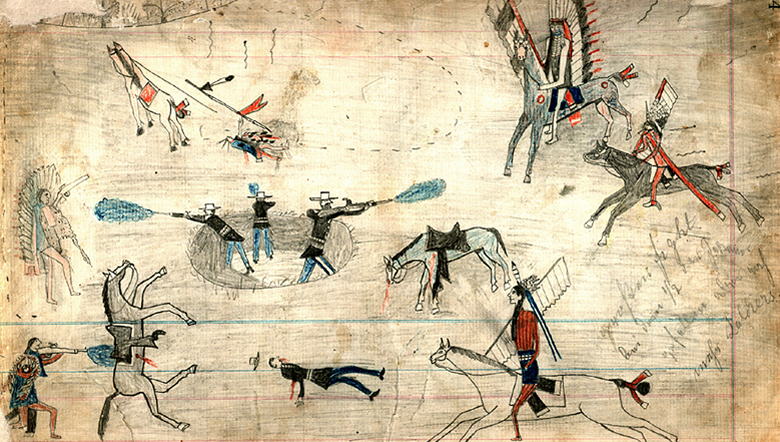
Kiowa ledger art drawing possibly depicting the Buffalo Wallow battle in 1874, a fight between Southern Plains Indians and the U.S. Army during the Red River War.

Ledger art is narrative drawing or painting on paper or cloth, predominantly practiced by Plains Indians but also from the Indigenous peoples of the Plateau and Great Basin. Ledger art flourished primarily from the 1860s to the 1920s. A revival of ledger art began in the 1960s and 1970s. The term comes from the accounting ledger books that were a common source of paper for Plains Indians during the late 19th century.

Battle exploits were the most frequently represented themes in ledger art. Many ledger artists documented the rapidly changing environment by portraying new technologies such as trains, as well as encounters with European Americans and American soldiers. Other themes such as religious practices, hunting, and courtship were also subjects. Many ledger artists worked together with ethnologists, to document cultural information such as shield and tipi designs, winter counts, dances and regalia.

== Historical precedents ==
Ledger art evolved from Plains hide painting. Among Plains tribes, women have historically painted abstract geometrical designs, such as those found in parfleches, whereas men paint representational designs. The men's designs were often heraldic devices or visions painted on shields, tipis, shirts, leggings, or robes. Before the Plains tribes were forced to live on reservations in the 1870s, men generally painted personal feats in battle or hunting. Plains ledger art depicted communally acknowledged events of valor and tribal importance in order to gain status for the individuals who participated in them, and their band and kin. Plains pictorial art emphasizes narrative action and eliminates unnecessary detail or backgrounds. Figures tended to be drawn in hard outlines and filled with solid fields of color.

These narrative works were all historically painted on animal hides – particularly buffalo hides. When buffalo became scarce after the US federal government's eradication programs, Plains artists began painting and drawing on paper, canvas, and muslin.

== Subject matter ==
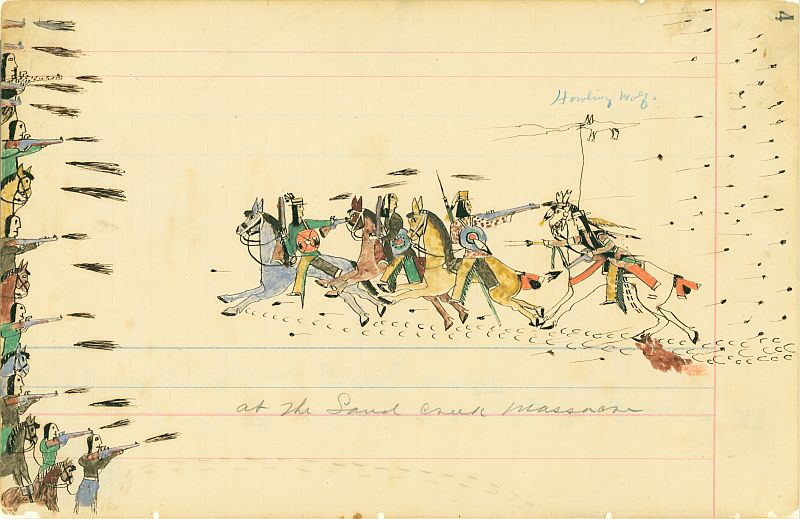
The Sand Creek massacre as drawn by eyewitness Howling Wolf (1874–1875).

Battle exploits dominated ledger art. Other themes such as hunting, courtship, and religious practices were common subjects. Ledger artists also documented their rapidly changing environment by portraying encroaching European Americans and new technologies such as trains and cameras. Many ledger artists worked with ethnologists, by documenting shield and tipi designs, ethnobotanical information, winter counts, dance customs and regalia, and other cultural information. Dreams and visions inspired ledger art just as they had inspired earlier hide paintings.

The artists creating ledger art today often reference pre-reservation lifeways, historical transitions, and social commentary. They use this style to illustrate cultural continuity between historical and contemporary Native life.

== New materials ==
An increasing supply of ledger books and other paper came from traders, government agents, missionaries, and military officers. With these came pencils, ink fountain pens, crayons, and watercolor paints. These new tools allowed for greater detail and experimentation than the earlier tools, such as bone or wood styli dipped in mineral pigments, had. The compact ledger books and pencils were highly portable, making them ideal for nomadic lifestyles.

== Communal authorship ==
The creation of ledger art at times involved communal authorship, with more than one artist contributing to an individual drawing, and several artists working within a specific ledger book. Many of the earlier ledger book drawings contained several signature glyphs, suggesting shared authorship. Examples of shared authorship are found in the Dog Soldiers ledgers, in which many of the drawings attributed to Bear with Feathers indicate that he drew the human figures, but another artist drew the horses. In 1877, a Northern Arapaho man named Friday, ally of the Northern Cheyenne, described communal drawing to Army Lt. John G. Bourke, stating that it was "extremely common" for close friends to draw in each other's books.

== Fort Marion ==
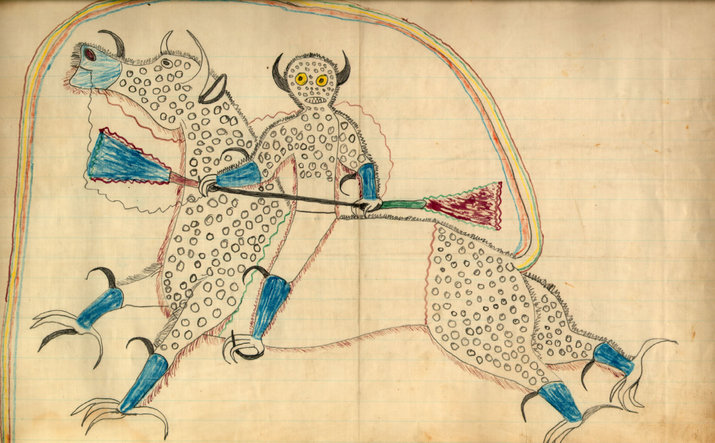
Drawing by Black Hawk (Sans Arc Lakota), c. 1880 depicting a horned Thunder Being (Haokah) on a horse-like creature with eagle talons and buffalo horns. The creature's tail forms a rainbow that represents the entrance to the Spirit World, and the dots represent hail. Accompanying the picture on the page were the words: "Dream or vision of himself changed to a destroyer and riding a buffalo eagle."

Some well-known ledger artists were prisoners of war at Fort Marion in St. Augustine, Florida. In 1874, in what became known as the Red River War or Buffalo War, a group of Cheyenne, Kiowa, Comanche, warriors fought the US Army to protect the last free herd of buffalo and to assert their autonomy. In the harsh winter of 1874 to 1875, many tribal camps were forced to surrender to various Indian agencies, and the supposed leaders of the Red River War were rounded up and sent to Fort Marion. From 1875 to 1878, the 71 men and one woman were under the command of Richard Henry Pratt, who used the opportunity to give the Indians a Western education. He also provided the prisoners with basic art supplies, such as pencils, ink, crayons, watercolor paint, and paper.

Twenty-six of the Fort Marion prisoners engaged in drawing. They were younger Cheyenne, Arapaho, and Kiowa men. Some of the most prolific and well-known artists include Paul Caryl Zotom (Kiowa); David Pendleton Oakerhater or Making Medicine (Cheyenne); Tichkematse or Squint Eyes (Cheyenne), who later worked for the Smithsonian Institution in Washington, DC; Wohaw (Kiowa); Howling Wolf (Cheyenne); Etahdleuh Doanmoe (Kiowa); White Bear (Arapaho); Koba (Kiowa); and Bear's Heart (Cheyenne). Tichtematse, Howling Wolf, White Bear, and Koba all continued drawing after their release from prison.

== Cheyenne Dog Soldier artists ==
Following a July 1869 battle at Summit Springs in northeastern Colorado, a ledger book was retrieved from the Cheyenne's burned village. A Cavalry trooper's notations on one of the pages states, "This book was captured by the Fifth U.S. Cavalry on their charge through the Indian Village July 10th 69." The collection of drawings are known as the Summit Springs Sketchbook, or Dog Soldier Ledger Book. The drawings in the book depict events and people from the period between the 1864 Sand Creek Massacre and the 1869 Summit Springs Battle.

=== Major artists ===
- Bear With Feathers - created 25 drawings in which he rendered the human figures, and it appears that another artist drew the horses.
- White Bird - created seventeen drawings, fourteen of which were autobiographical.
- Red Lance - created sixteen drawings, six of which are autobiographical, two depict Buffalo Robe, three depict White Horse, and the rest depict other warriors. Red Lance often drew horses in true profile.
- Unidentified artist (Two Birds or Black Bear) - created ten pages. Two Birds is depicted with a complete eagle feather fall, and carrying a red shield; Black Bear is depicted with an upright headdress with several ermine tails.

=== Minor artists ===
White Horse created three drawings using the "X-ray technique". Pistol created three autobiographical drawings using the X-ray technique. Tomahawk created four highly graphic drawings. White Wolf created five drawings, three of which were autobiographical. Warrior X (unnamed) created three autobiographical drawings.

== Amidon ledger book drawings ==
Dated from around 1885, the Amidon ledger book was named for the place it was found in Amidon, North Dakota, in a storage box at the Slope County Court House. The principal artist was Jaw (Ćehu′pa) or His Fight (Oki'cize-ta'wa), a Hunkpapa (Húŋkpapȟa) Lakota man, who created 87 of the more than 107 drawings in the ledger book. After being scanned and inventoried, this historical object of cultural value was then dismantled as individual drawings that were sold on the open market to private collectors and institutions; a commercial trend in the 20th and early 21st centuries. Ross Frank, director of the UCSD Plains Ledger Art Project states that "Commercialization of ledger art starts with the Fort Marion artists. It's a process of the non-Indian world appropriating Indian art as trophies and souvenirs."

== Other ledger books ==
=== Cheyenne ===
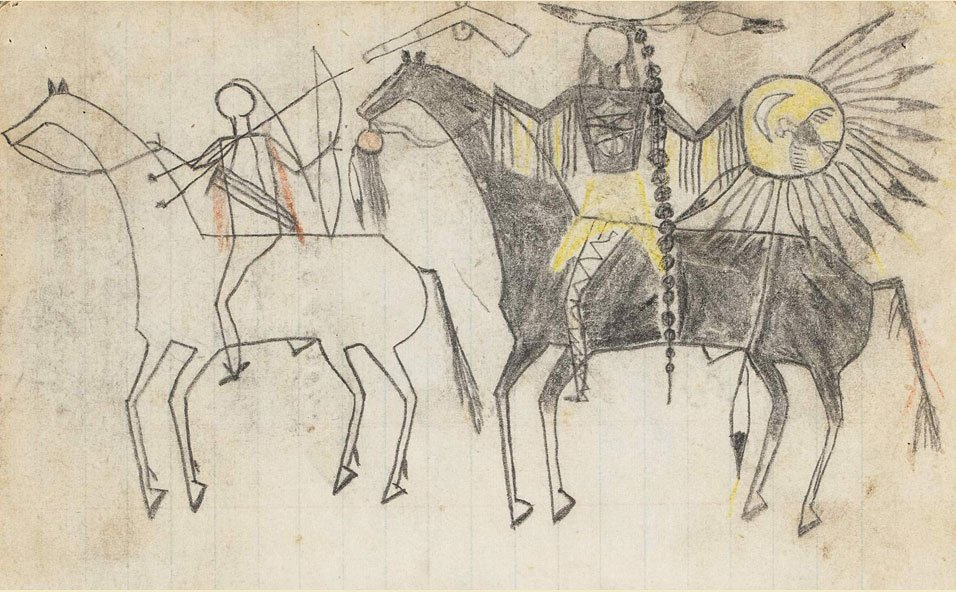
Ledger drawing from the Bowstring Warrior Society Ledger, pencil, colored pencil, c. 1850s

Cheyenne ledger books include:Abbott Ledger (Northern Cheyenne)

- The Arrow's Elk Society Ledger (Southern Cheyenne)
- Bear's Heart Ledger Book (Southern Cheyenne), 24 drawings in graphite and crayon signed by the artist, c. 1875/76
- Bethel Moore Custer Ledger (Northern Cheyenne), c. 1881
- Black Horse Ledger (Northern Cheyenne), c. 1878
- Cheyenne Bowstring Warrior Society (Southern Cheyenne), pencil, colored pencil, c. 1850s
- Coe-Cheyenne Ledger (Southern Cheyenne)
- Dunham Album (Southern Cheyenne), pencil and colored pencil
- Ewers Ledger (Northern Cheyenne), pencil and colored pencil
- Frank Henderson Ledger (Southern Arapaho and/or Southern Tsistisistas), c. 1882
- Keeling Ledger (Northern Cheyenne), 115 drawings in pencil and colored pencil
- Little Shield Ledger–Schøyen (Northern Cheyenne), a significant pictographic source for the Platte River Indian war. Drawings, name glyphs and cursive script by Little Shield and Black Moon, 1865–1879
- Little Whirlwind Ledger also known as Prisoner's Ledger Drawing Book (Northern Cheyenne) 1897-1898. Drawings by Little Whirlwind of the Tongue River Reservation, drawn while in prison (for a crime he did not commit) at the Miles City, Montana jail
- Mad Bull Ledger (Arapaho and Southern Cheyenne); c. 1884
- Northern Cheyenne Ledger-Kansas State Historical Society (Northern Cheyenne), drawn by Northern Cheyenne warrior-artists during imprisonment for alleged crimes in the Dodge City jail, pencil, colored crayons, red watercolor, black ink, c. 1878-1879
- Pamplin Cheyenne/Arapaho Ledger (Arapaho and Southern Cheyenne)
- Porcupine Ledger-Schøyen (Northern Cheyenne), pencil and crayon drawings by Northern Cheyenne leader Porcupine in Dodge City Jail. Dodge City, Kansas, 1879
- Rodolphe Petter Cheyenne Ledger (Southern Cheyenne), drawn during the 1890s in pencil, pen and black ink
- Sheridan Ledger (Southern Cheyenne), pencil and colored pencil, "Artist C" is Arrow
- Soldier's Diary Ledger (Northern Cheyenne), pencil, colored pencil, c. 1876
- Spotted Hawk Ledger (Northern Cheyenne), drawn by Spotted Hawk in pencil and colored pencil in Miles City jail, Miles City, Montana, c. 1897
- Tie Creek Ledger Book (Northern Cheyenne), Drawn in colored pencil, lead pencil, pen and ink, watercolor. Cover inscription by Jas Clayton states: "Pictures drawn by Wild Hog and other northern Cheyenne Indian Chiefs while in the Dodge City jail in May 1879"
- Wild Hog Ledger-Kansas State Historical Society (Northern Cheyenne), c. 1879
- Wild Hog Ledger-Schøyen (Northern Cheyenne), drawn by Wild Hog, Kansas in 1879. Ledger book is smaller than most, approximately 3 by 5 inches

=== Kiowa ===
Kiowa ledger books include: Bad Eye Sketchbook (Kiowa); Etadleuh Doanmoe Sketchbook - Rice County Historical Society (Kiowa); Finley-Kiowa Ledger No. 1 (Kiowa); Finley-Kiowa Ledger No. 2 (Kiowa); Kiowa Sketchbook - Davis Museum (Kiowa); Koba-Russel Sketchbook (Kiowa); Silver Horn Ledger Book – Nelson-Atkins (Kiowa); Zotom Sketchbook - Taylor Museum (Kiowa)

=== Lakota ===
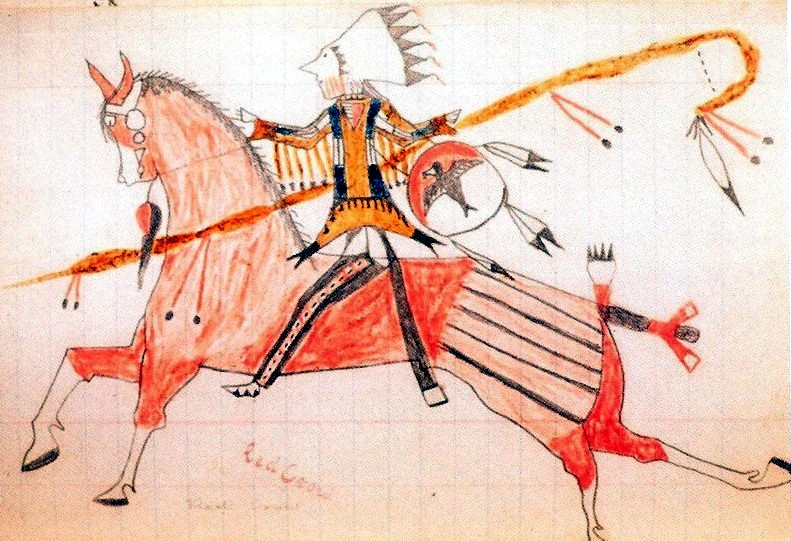
The warrior "Low Dog" by Red Dog, 1884 ledger art

Lakota (Sioux) ledger books include: Black Hawk Ledger (Lakota Sioux, Sans Arc); Black Road - Wilkins Ledger (Lakota Sioux); Fales-Freeman Brulé Ledger (Lakota (Sioux) Brulé; Lakota (Sioux) Sicangu); Goodwyn Ledger (Lakota Sioux); Jaw-Amidon Ledger (Lakota (Sioux) Hunkpapa); Jaw-Macnider Ledger (Lakota Sioux); Leatherwood/Scares the Enemy Ledger (Lakota (Sioux) Brulé); Rosebud School Album (Lakota Sioux–Brulé); Sitting Bull (Oglala) – Saville Ledger (Lakota Sioux); Sweetwater Ledger Book (Lakota Sioux); Walter Bone Shirt Ledger (Lakota Sioux–Brulé); Walter Bone Shirt Ledger - Mansfield Library (Lakota Sioux-Brulé)

== Commodification and dispersal ==
In the 20th and 21st centuries, many of the ledger books were unbound, and the individual drawings were sold by commercial galleries and auction houses to individual collectors and institutions as "hot commodities in the art market" costing tens of thousands of dollars per drawing. The narrative order of the drawings in these books was lost when they were sold page-by-page, after having been stolen, scavenged or gifted by non-native people, thus losing "the integrity of the full ledger book". The roots of this commercialization can be traced to the late 19th century, when the founder of the Carlisle Indian School, Col. Richard Pratt began to teach entrepreneurial values to the Fort Marion prisoners of war. Artists held in this prison camp, such as Zotom and Howling Wolf were trained to create drawings on commission to "wealthy white patrons" in his efforts to assimilate the prisoners.

== Easel arts ==
Missionaries, anthropologists, and tourists eagerly collected ledger books in the late 19th century. Carl Sweezy (Southern Arapaho, 1881–1953) and Haungooah (Silver Horn) (Kiowa, 1860–1940) both established professional careers as ledger artists.

These early Southern Plains easel artists in turn inspired the Kiowa Six. These artists painted with Western art-grade materials and met with international success when they exhibited their work in the 1928 International Art Congress in Prague, Czechoslovakia.

== Contemporary interpretations ==
Numerous Northern and Southern Plains artists create ledger paintings, today, including many women artists despite Plains narrative figurative painting being a masculine art genre in the past.

== Notable ledger artists ==
=== Historical ===
- Amos Bad Heart Bull, Oglala Lakota
- Black Hawk, Sans Arc Lakota
- Howling Wolf (Cheyenne) Bow String Warrior Society Member
- Jaw (Ćehu′pa) or His Fight (Okicize Tawa) (ca. 1853-1924), Hunkpapa Lakota, created the Amidon Ledger
- Annie Little Warrior (Hunkpapa Lakota, 1895–1966)
- Miwakan Yuhala, Man Who Carries the Sword (Oglala Lakota, ca. 1847–1910)
- Red Horse (Lakota chief), Lakota, 42 ledger drawings of Battle of the Little Big Horn
- David Pendleton Oakerhater, Southern Cheyenne, member of the Bow String Warrior Society
- Silver Horn, Kiowa
- Sitting Bull, Hunkpapa Lakota
- White Horse, Kiowa
- Yellow Nose, Ute, captured as a child by Cheyenne. Dog Soldier Warrior Society Member

=== Contemporary ===
- Sharron Ahtone Harjo (Kiowa)
- Arthur Amiotte (Oglala Lakota)
- Sherman Chaddlesone (Kiowa, 1947–2013)
- Linda Haukaas (Sicangu Lakota)
- Dolores Purdy (Caddo/Winnebago)
- Terran Last Gun (Piikani Blackfoot)
- Chris Pappan (Kaw/Osage/Cheyenne River Lakota)
- Harvey Pratt (Cheyenne-Arapaho Tribes)

== Gallery ==
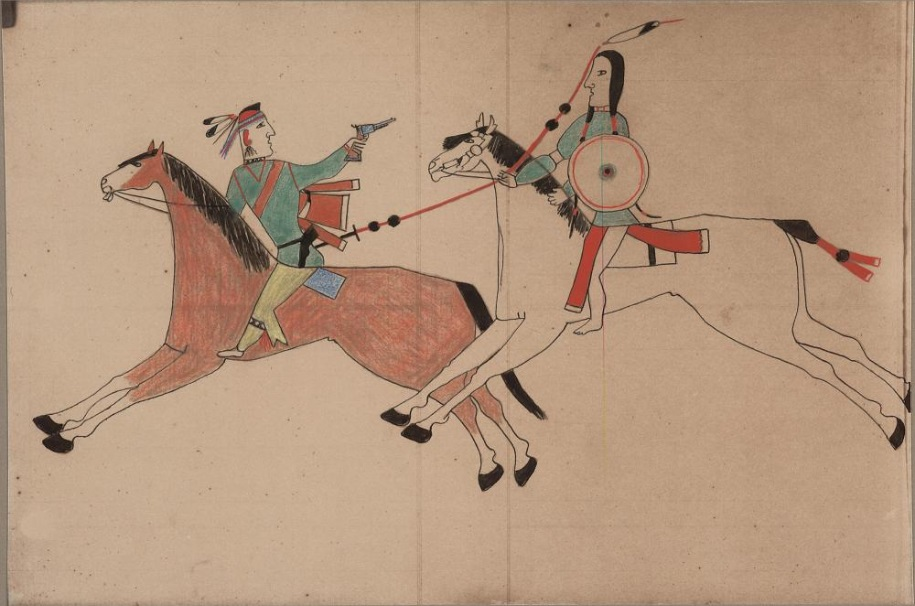
Ledger drawing - Cheyenne and Pawnee or Osage fight

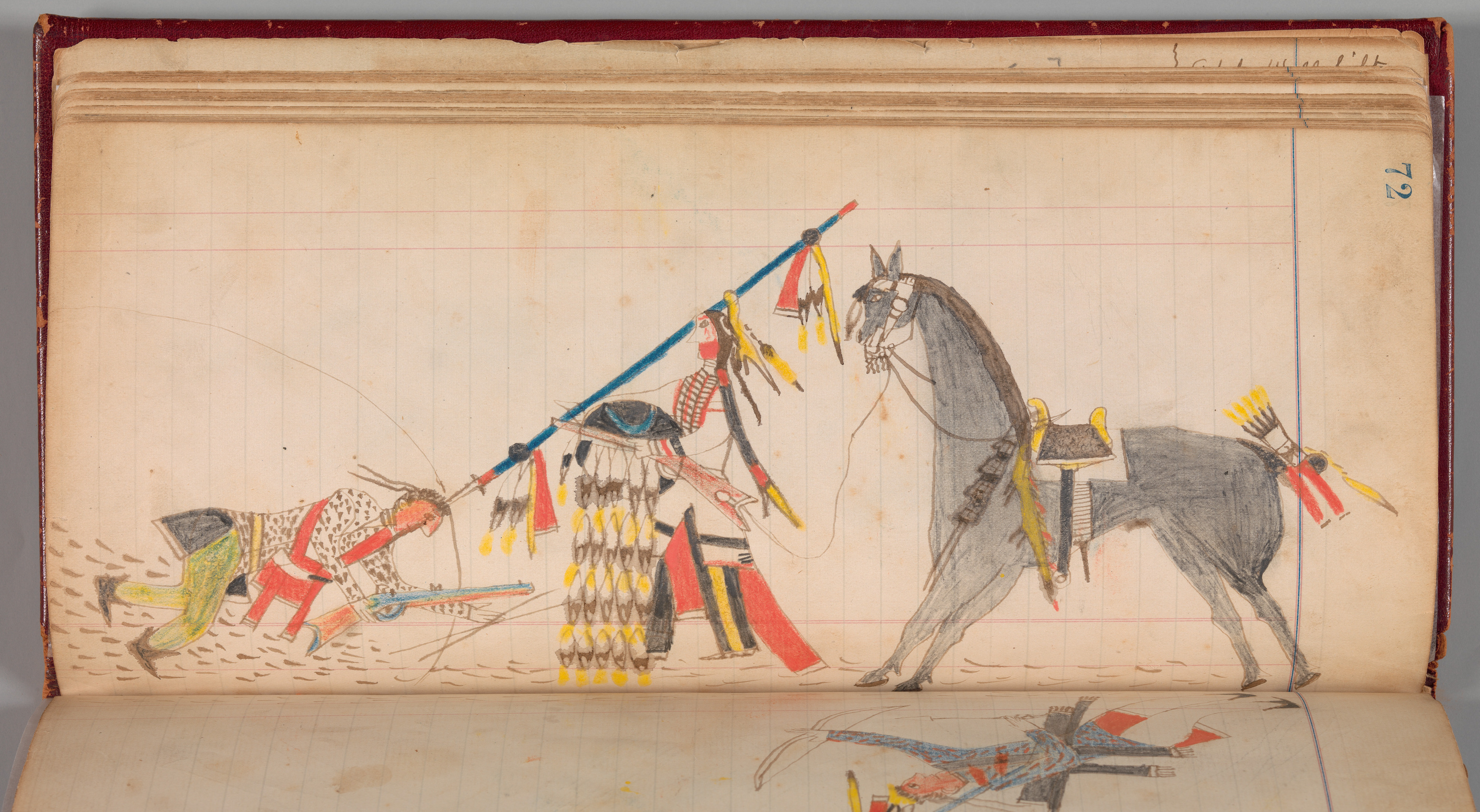
Maffet Ledger - Drawing Metropolitan Museum DP318424

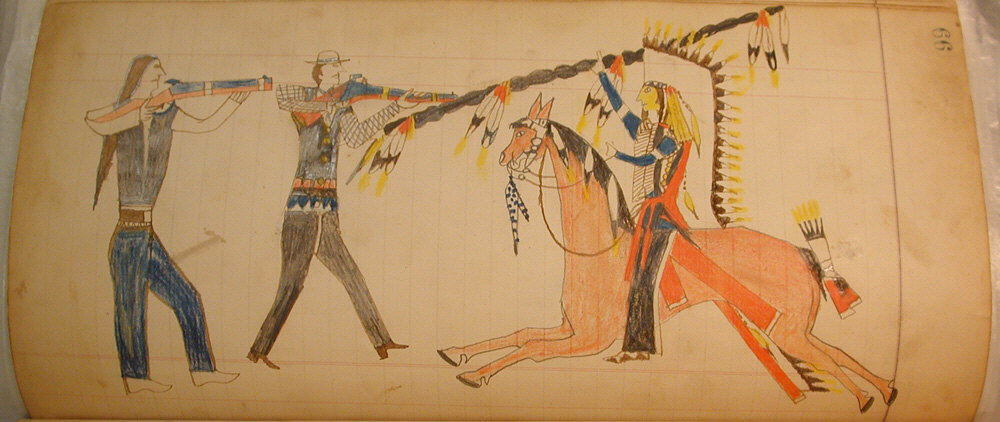
Maffet Ledger - Drawing Metropolitan Museum page66; graphite, watercolor and crayon

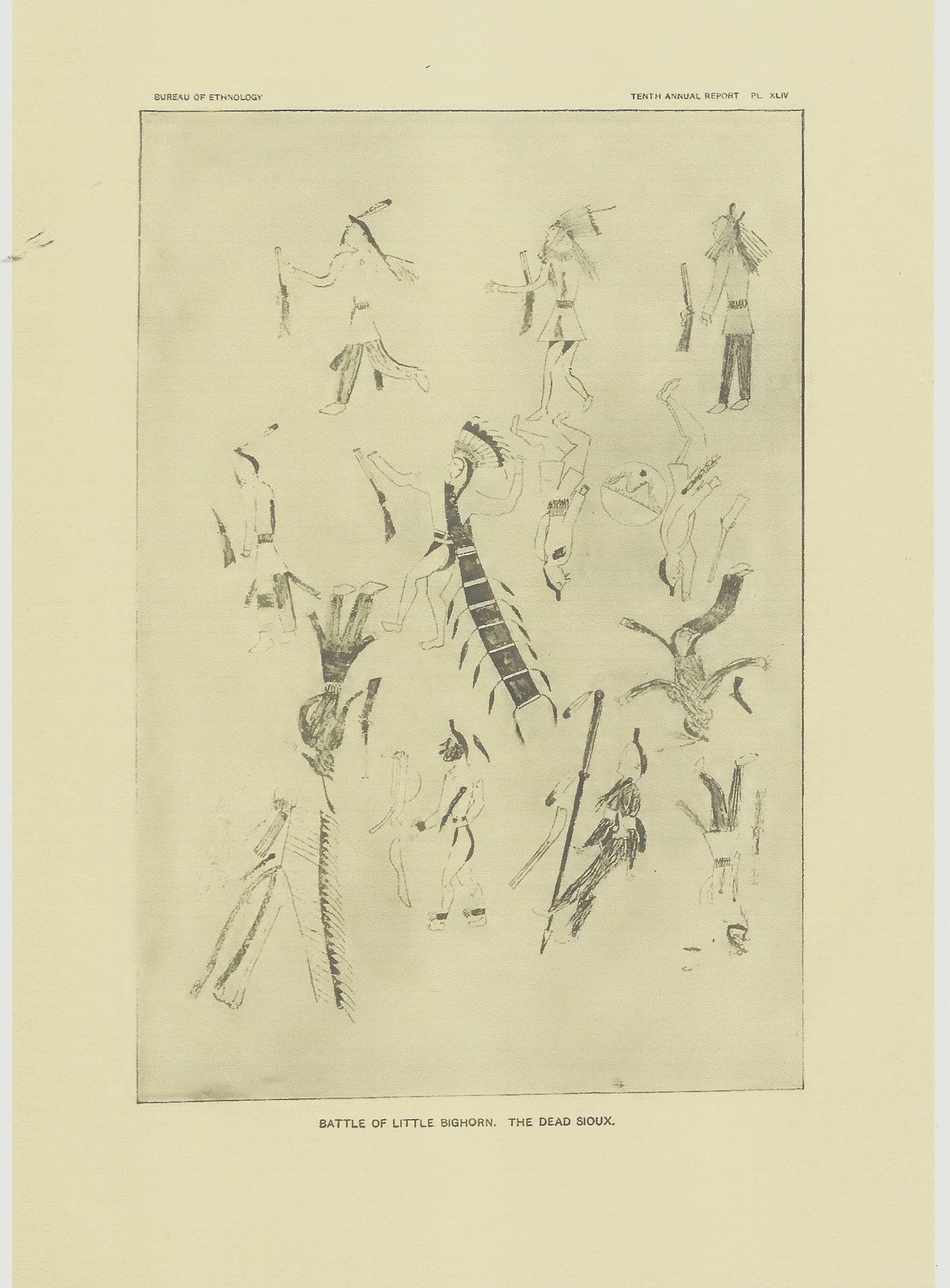
Red Horse Ledger art of Lakota Killed at Little Bighorn. Published as Plate XLIV

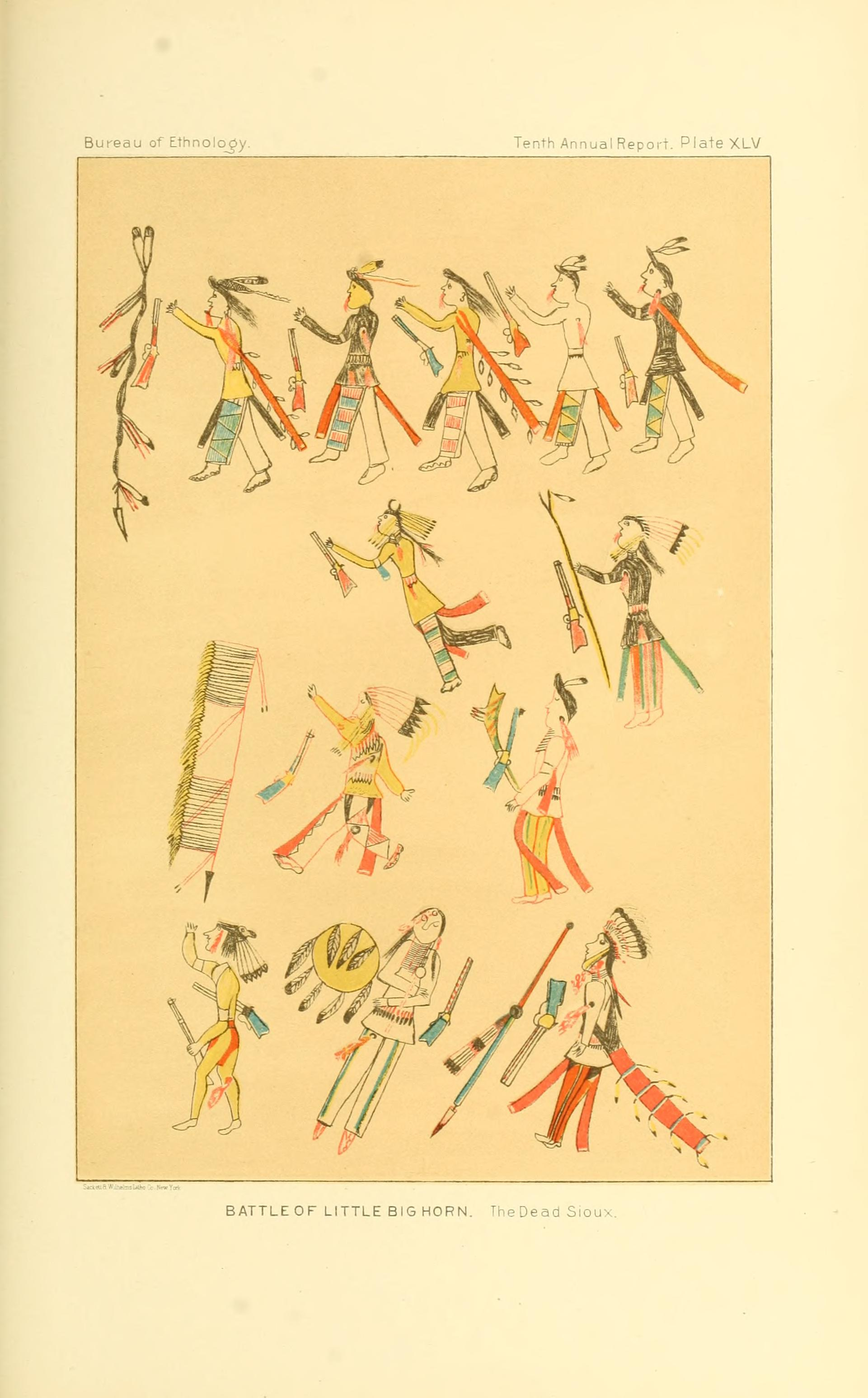
Red Horse Ledger art of Lakota killed at Little Bighorn. Published as Plate XLV

== See also ==
- Maffet Ledger
