= Linda Haukaas =

Sičháŋǧu Oyáte artist

Linda Haukaas is a contemporary Sicangu Lakota, Native American, ledger artist. Haukaas' work can be found in numerous museums such as the Brooklyn Museum, the British Museum, and the National Museum of the American Indian. Haukaas "breaks new ground as a female ledger artist defying the tradition of this male dominated genre."

== Biography ==
Linda Haukaas was born in 1957 on the Rosebud Indian Reservation in Okreek, South Dakota. She has a brother. Throughout her childhood, she moved between San Juan, Puerto Rico, Sarasota, Florida, and the Rosebud Indian Reservation in Okreek, South Dakota due to her father's government job. Haukaas grew up primarily in San Juan, Puerto Rico, where her mother was from, and visited the Reservation some summers. Haukaas attended the University of Nebraska for college.

== Style and content ==
In her art, Haukaas looks at themes that are "focused on the commonalities which consisted of love, family, traditions, and making art." Her content mainly focuses on "the adaptability and stability of tribal life, the details of the rituals of daily life that provide tiospaye, family individual sustenance… stability, continuity, and a thriving society." Haukaas creates ledger art, which is a "narrative drawing or painting on paper or cloth" and is a traditionally masculine style of art. The majority of Haukaas' drawings are done with colored pencil and ink on ledger paper. She has also been known to use "old period ledgers" to draw on.

An example of Haukaas' style and content can be seen in her drawing, Horse Nation from 2010. This drawing was created on late 1800's ledger paper with colored pencil and ink and can be found in the Brooklyn Museum. It shows four women standing in front of four horses. The women are wearing elaborate regalia that depicts horses in war and each woman is carrying a feather fan and a pouch. Haukaas comments on this work saying it "honors ‘tasunka wakan’ (the horse) for its importance for the Lakota People. The horse allowed them to increase their mobility for hunting, expand their territory, strengthen their ‘akicita’ (protective warrior societies), improve their economy, relieve their burdens, and, most importantly, gave women someone else to love.”

== Individual artworks ==
Women's Dance at Okreek, 1996 (Peabody Essex Museum)

Girl Talk, 1998 (Eiteljorg Museum of American Indians and Western Art)

At the Museum, 2001 (Artist's Collection)

Snagging, 2001 (National Museum of the American Indian)

Lakota Woman I and Lakota Woman II, 2003 (Artist's Collection)

Manly Heart Woman Stealling Back Horses, 2003 (Hood Museum of Art)

Return From War Dance, 2003 (Hood Museum of Art)

Chase the Art Patron, 2006 (Artist's Collection)

Pre-market Prep, 2006 (Collection of Michael and Jody Wahlig)

The Artist Releases Her Soul, The Art Patron Seeks to Possess It, 2007 (New Mexico Museum of Art)

Her First Dance, 2008 (Collection of Ellen Taubman)

Protecting Our Families, 2009 (British Museum)

Horse Nation, 2010 ( Brooklyn Museum)

Quilling Society, 2010 (Brooklyn Museum)
