= Delphine Red Shirt =

American journalist

Delphine Red Shirt (born 1957) is a Native American author and educator, who is an enrolled member of the Oglala Sioux Tribe of the Pine Ridge Reservation.

== Early life and education ==
Delphine Red Shirt is Oglala Lakota from the Pine Ridge Indian reservation. She attended Holy Rosary High School (now Red Cloud Indian School), and Regis College (now Regis University), with a major in accounting and a minor in History. She received her Master of Arts in Liberal Studies in Creative Writing from Wesleyan University, and her doctorate in American Indian Studies from the University of Arizona.

== Career ==
Red Shirt has been a member of the United States Marine Corps, served as the Chairperson of the United Nations NGO Committee on the International Decade of the World's Indigenous People, and as the United Nations Representative for the Four Directions Council: International Indigenous Organization. As a visiting lecturer at Yale University, Connecticut College, and Wayne State University, she is currently a lecturer in Decolonized History and the Lakota language at Stanford University. She has continued to serve as a mentor and advisor to Native students.

Red Shirt has also authored three books: Bead On An Anthill: A Lakota Childhood, Turtle Lung Woman's Granddaughter, and most recently, George Sword's Warrior Narratives, which has been awarded the Labriola Center American Indian National Book Award from Arizona State University and the 2017 Electa Quinney Award for Published Stories from the University of Wisconsin-Milwaukee. Her work has been anthologized in various publications, including Tongue-Tied: The Lives of Multilingual Children in Public Education by Otto Santa Ana, and the Western Women's Reader: The Remarkable Writings of Women Who Shaped The American West, Spanning 300 Years. She continues to be a regular contributor to Lakota Country Times and has written for Native Sun News and Indian Country Today.

== Bibliography ==
- Turtle Lung Woman's Granddaughter. Lincoln: University of Nebraska Press, 1997.
- Bead on an Anthill: A Lakota Childhood. Lincoln: University of Nebraska Press, 1997. ISBN 0-8032-8976-6.
- George Sword's Warrior Narratives: Compositional Processes in Lakota Oral Tradition. Lincoln: University of Nebraska Press, 2016.

== See also ==
- List of writers from peoples indigenous to the Americas
- Native American Studies
