= Jaw (Ćehu′pa) =

Lakota native American artist

Jaw/Ćehu′pa, also known as His Fight/Oki'cize-ta'wa
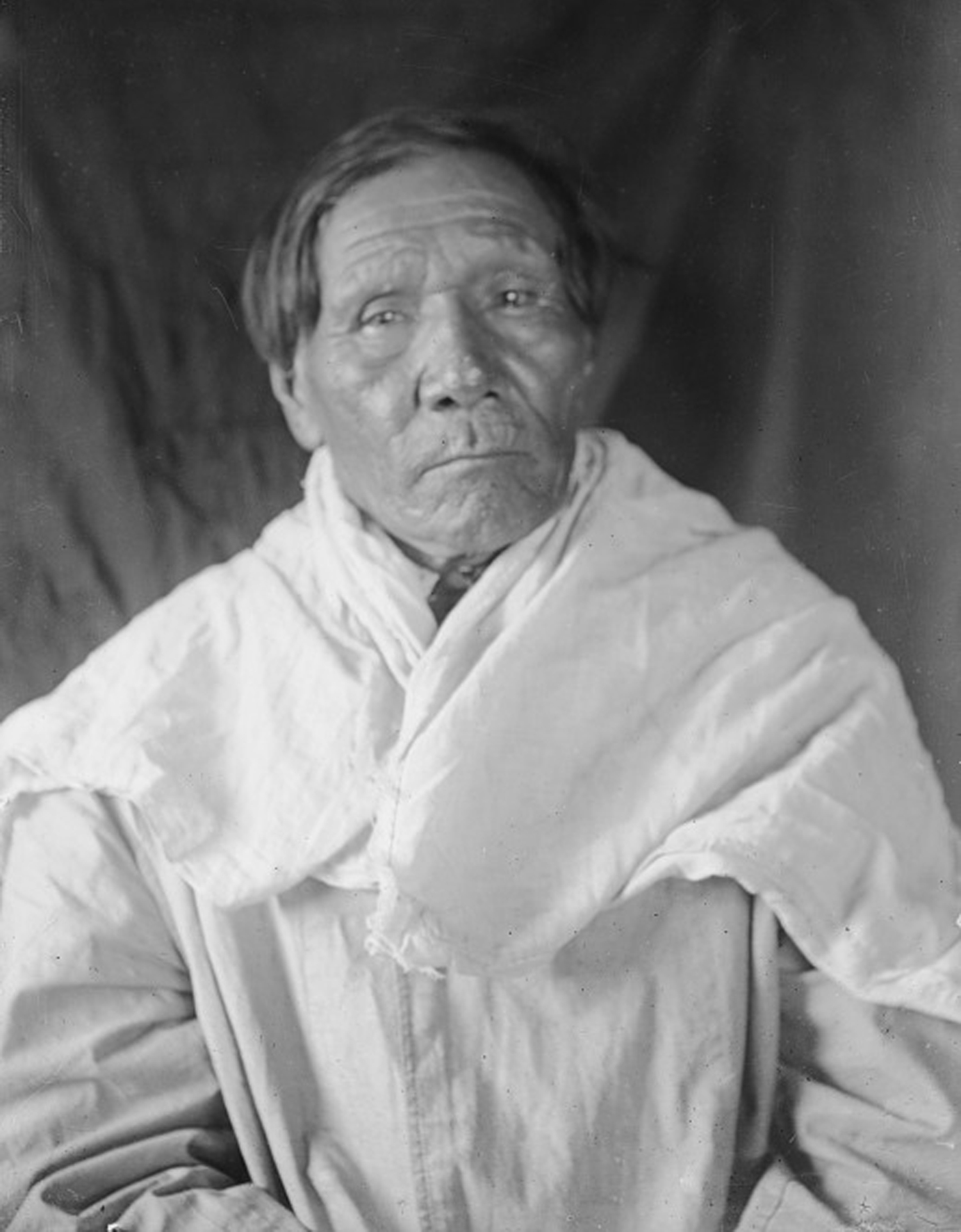
- Jaw (Ćehu′pa) or His Fight (Oki'cize-ta'wa) in 1913
- Born: c. 1850/1853 northern Great Plains, United States
- Died: 22 July 1924 (aged 70–71); Standing Rock Indian Reservation, South Dakota, United States
- Occupations: Winter count keeper, ledger art artist, warrior
- Spouse(s): (1) Corn (Wa-hu-wa-pa), born ca. 1852, died before 1885; (2) Fear her Knife (Tamalakakipapi) born ca. 1851, died 25 November 1916
- Children: Killing of a White Buffalo (Pte-san-o-pi-win), Looks Behind (Ha-ki-kta-win)

Jaw/Ćehu'pa, also known as His Fight/Oki'cize-ta'wa, was a Hunkpapa (Húŋkpapȟa) Lakota Winter count keeper and Ledger art artist

Commonly known as Jaw (Ćehu'pa), a name which he allegedly received from a white brother-in-law, was born somewhere on the northern Great Plains of the United States c. 1850/1853 to a Sans Arc (Itazipcola, Hazipco - 'Those who hunt without bows') father and a Hunkpapa mother, both bands of the then free roaming Teton (Thítȟuŋwaŋ) Lakota. He lost his mother when he was very young and was subsequently raised by his maternal grandmother. His childhood name was Ma'za-ho'waste (Loud-sounding Metal), and at the age of 17 he was given the name of Oki'cize-ta'wa (His Fight), which was his true name among his people. He was given this name after taking part in a fight for the first time. He had been out with a war party once before gaining recognition for being an exceptional horse raider, but this was his first experience in actual warfare. Jaw participated in the Battle of the Little Bighorn in 1876. He followed Sitting Bull into the Canadian exile, returning and surrendering to the United States in early January 1881. Jaw was settled on the Standing Rock Indian Reservation where he would live the remainder of his life. His military prowess not only gained him celebrity among the Lakota people, but also among white artists and ethnologists. In 1884, American artist DeCost Smith was compelled to paint him due to his accolades.The warrior-artist is best known today on account of music ethnologist Frances Densmore (1867–1957) who had interviewed Jaw in 1911/1912 and was the recipient of several of his works. A highly prolific artist, Jaw is known to have drawn several ledger books, one of which is currently housed in the collections at the South Dakota State Historical Society in Pierre, South Dakota. He has been identified as the principal artist of the Macnider and the Amidon ledgers, both dated about 1885. The Amidon Ledger, so named because it had been found in a storage box at the Slope County Court House in Amidon, North Dakota in 1985 and subsequently sold. In 2016, prior to being dismantled and sold to collectors as individual drawings, the ledger was scanned and inventoried by the Plains Ledger Art Project of the University of California San Diego, Department of Ethnic Studies. 87 or more of the 107 drawings found in the ledger book have been attributed to Jaw. Jaw was one of the principal Lakota experts on traditional life. He was in his late fifties/early sixties when he worked with Densmore, singing to her the songs of his life as a warrior, and painting on muslin the scenes from his early life as a hunter, horse stealer, and ritual healer. Densmore was not the only non-Native with whom Jaw shared his stories. From 1885 to 1910, Mary Collins worked as a missionary at Little Eagle, on the Standing Rock Indian Reservation. In her papers are drawings made on used pages torn from a ledger book. Several depict the war and horse-stealing exploits of a man whose name is written on the drawings as Okicinintawa. The pictorial autobiography presented in those drawings shows that he was a member of the Lakota Miwa'tani Society. He wears the long red feather-bedecked wool sash of that military brotherhood. In one of these drawings he counts coup on a Crow man and woman, while in another he steals horses.

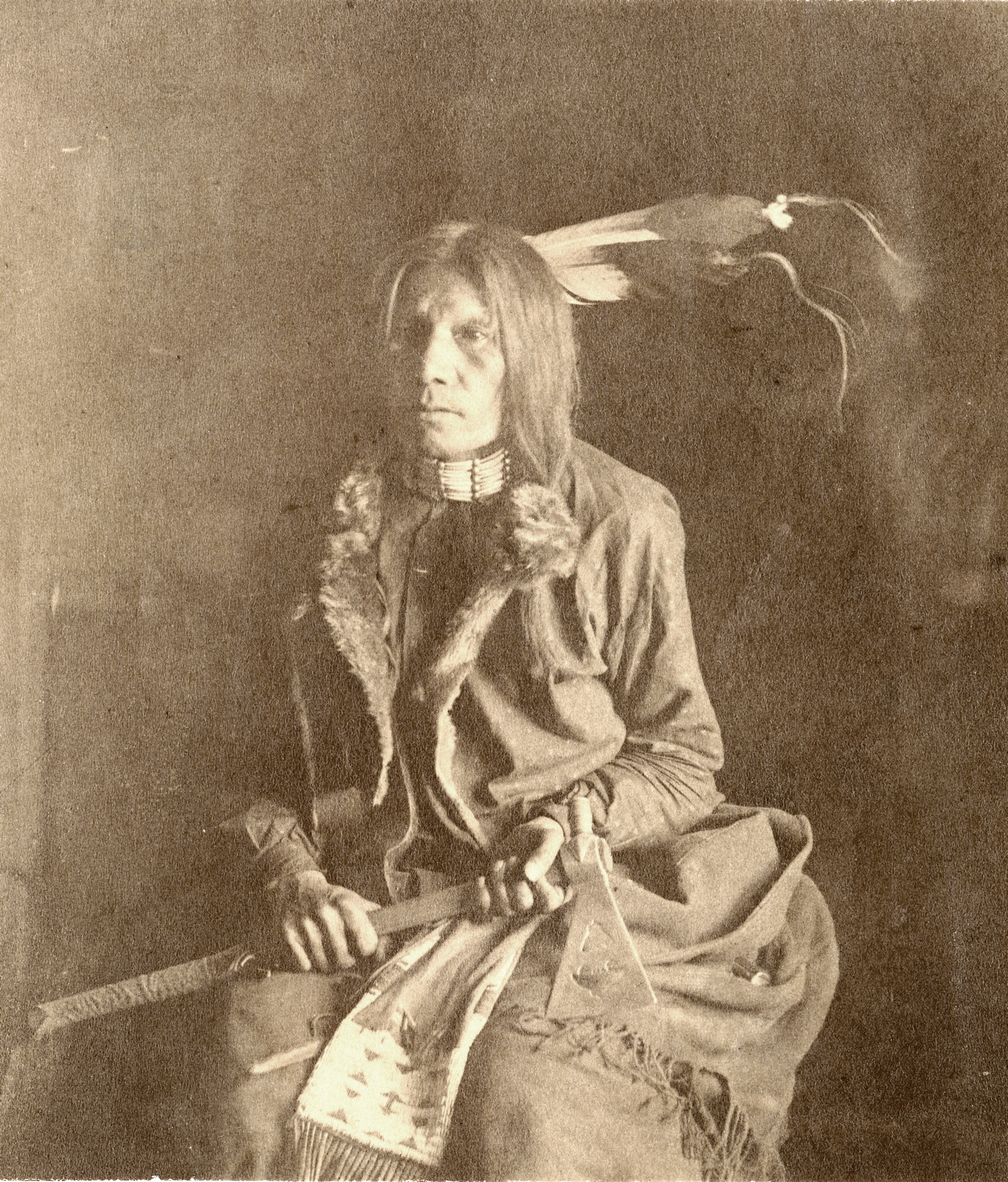
Jaw/Ćehu′pa, also known as His Fight/Oki'cize-ta'wa

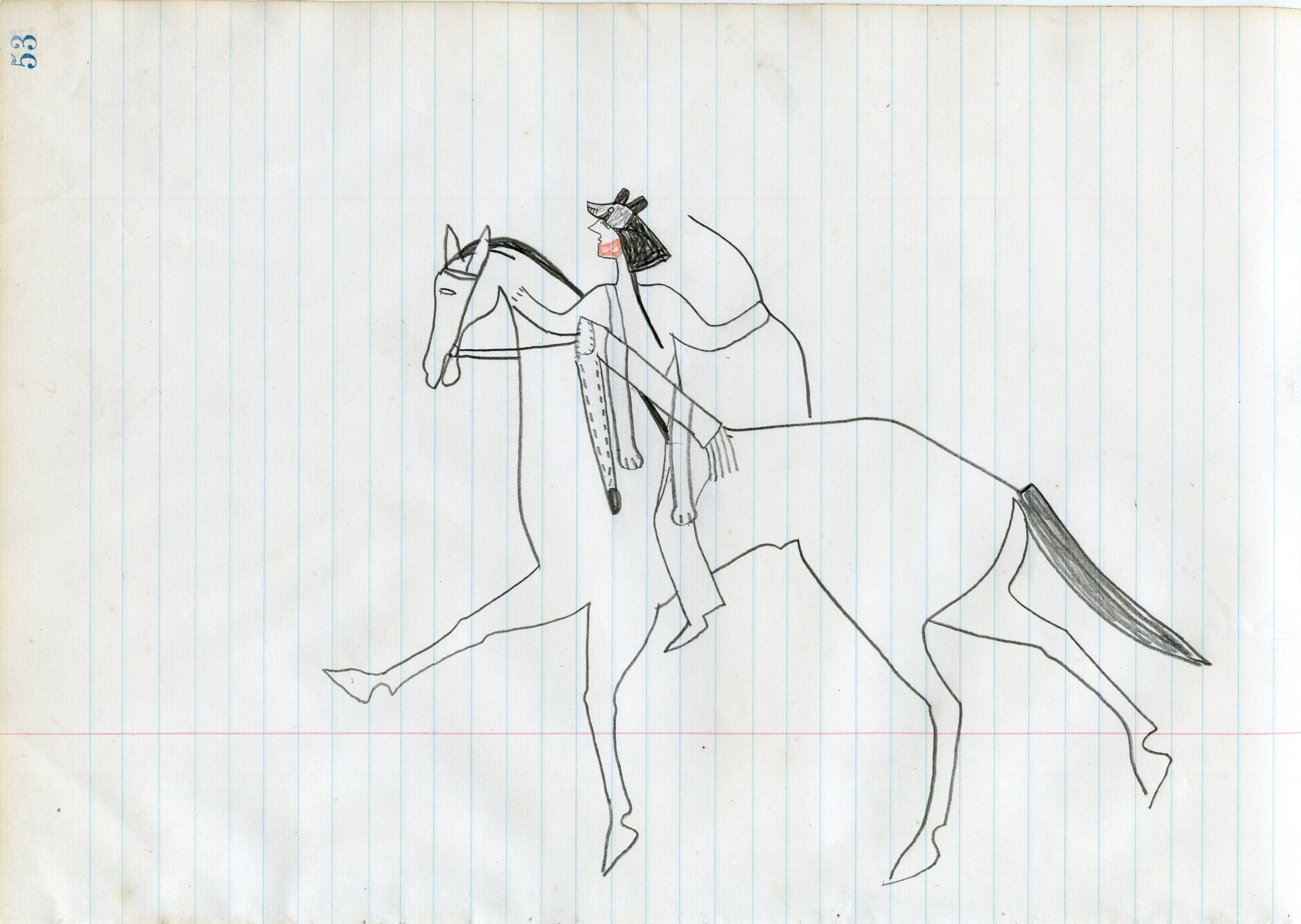
Amidon Ledger page No 53 by Jaw c. 1885

== Family and death ==
Jaw was married at least twice. By his first wife Corn (Wa-hu-wa-pa), born about 1852, there are two daughters documented, Killing of a White Buffalo (Pte-san-o-pi-win) and Looks Behind (Ha-ki-kta-win), both likely born during the Canadian exile. His wife and daughters appear to have died soon after they had been settled on Standing Rock Agency and by 1885 he had a new wife, Fear her Knife (Tamalakakipapi), born about 1851.
