= Mi-Wa-Kan Yu-Ha-La =

Lakota policeman (c.1847–1910)

Miwakan Yuhala
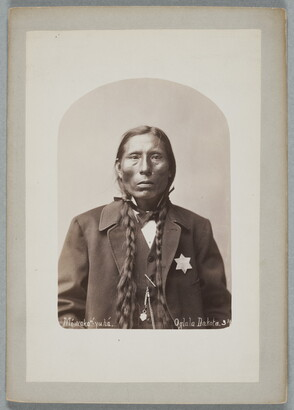
- Mi-Wa-Kan Yu-Ha-La, photograph taken by Charles Milton Bell (1875)
- Born: ca. 1847
- Died: 1910; South Dakota
- Resting place: Saint Matthews Episcopal Cemetery, Slim Butte, South Dakota
- Other names: George Sword, Man Who Carries the Sword
- Citizenship: Oglala Sioux Tribe
- Occupations: Police captain, Judge
- Style: Ledger art

Mi-Wa-Kan Yu-Ha-La (ca. 1847 – 1910) was an Oglala Lakota law enforcement officer and judge. He was also a ledger artist whose work is in the collections of the National Museum of the American Indian.

== Name ==
Miwakan Yuhala is a Lakota name, translating to "Man Who Carries the Sword." He is also known as George Sword.

== Career ==
Miwakan Yuhala served as captain of the police at the Pine Ridge Agency in South Dakota. and a judge in a Native American court.

== Legacy ==
Delphine Red Shirt (Oglala Lakota) published stories told by Miwakan Yuhala in George Sword's Warrior Narratives: Compositional Processes in Lakota Oral Tradition (University of Nebraska Press, 2016).
