= Terran Last Gun =

Native American artist from Canada

- Saakwaynaamah’kaa (Last Gun)
- Born: 1989 (age 36–37); Browning, Montana
- Citizenship: Blackfeet Tribe of the Blackfeet Indian Reservation of Montana and American
- Education: Institute of American Indian Arts, Santa Fe
- Known for: serigraphy, drawing, painting, ledger art
- Website: terranlastgun.com

Terran Last Gun (born 1989, Browning, Montana) is a visual artist and citizen of the Piikani (Blackfeet), who are members of the Siksikaitsitapii (Blackfoot Confederacy). He lives and works in Santa Fe, New Mexico.

== Early life ==
Last Gun is a Piikani (Blackfeet) citizen, born in Browning, Montana. He grew up on the Blackfeet Reservation.

Last Gun's father, Terrance Guardipee (Blackfeet) is a ledger artist, who encouraged his son to pursue a degree in museum studies at the Institute of American Indian Arts. Beginning in the fourth grade, he attended the Lost Children immersion school which is located in the Piikani Nation. The school was founded in part by Darrell Robes Kipp, who is Last Gun's great uncle.

== Education ==
In 2011, Last Gun received an A.S. degree in Environmental Science from Blackfeet Community College, Browning, Montana, and went on to receive a Bachelor of Fine Arts in Museum Studies as well as an Associate of Fine Arts in Studio Arts in 2016 from the Institute of American Indian Arts in Santa Fe, New Mexico.

== Work ==
Last Gun primarily works in serigraphy, painting, ledger drawing and photography. His work interprets cultural narratives of nature and the cosmos, connecting the ancient world to contemporary realms. Last Gun states, "I am revealing fragments of time, history, and Indigenous Abstraction — an art form that has continued for tens of thousands of years." Last Gun has stated that the painted lodges of the Blackfeet are a source of inspiration that he draws on in his work. The imagery used in the painted lodges has been passed down through generations. These designs have three zones: the upper sky world, the middle zone representing the animal spirit helpers, and the lower zone of Earth.

In 2018, Last Gun had a solo show at the Institute of American Indian Arts; in 2020 he had a solo show, Terran Last Gun: Color Play at the Museum of Contemporary Native Arts, Santa Fe and has had two solo shows, in 2019 and 2020, at Hecho a Mano Gallery, Santa Fe. In 2021, he had a one-person show at Blue Star Contemporary, San Antonio, Texas. In 2024, Terran had a two-person show at Gallery Hózhó in Albuquerque, New Mexico, featuring his ledger drawings. His work has been included in group exhibitions at the Rainmaker Gallery in Bristol, UK, SITE Santa Fe and the Santa Fe Institute, among other venues.

== Awards and honors ==
In 2020 Last Gun received a fellowship from the First People's Fund as an "Artist in Business Leadership", and a Story Maps fellowship from the Santa Fe Art Institute.

In 2016 he received a Goodman Aspiring Artist fellowship from the Museum of Indian Arts and Culture. In 2017 he was an artist-in-residence at the IAIA Museum of Contemporary Art.

== Collections ==
- IAIA Museum of Contemporary Native Arts, Santa Fe, NM
- Institute of American Indian Arts, Public Art Collection, Santa Fe, NM
- Ralph T. Coe Center for the Arts, Santa Fe, NM
- The Heritage Center at Red Cloud Indian School, Pine Ridge, SD
- The Hockaday Museum of Art, Kalispell, MT
