= Red Horse (Lakota chief) =

Miniconjou Sioux sub-chief

- Tasunka Luta
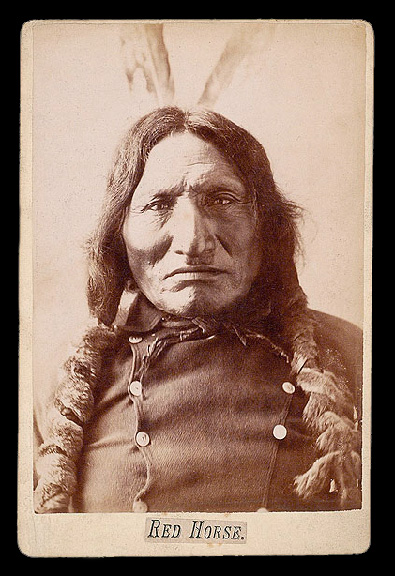
- Red Horse (1822-1907), Miniconjou Sioux chief. Commercial cabinet card published by David F. Barry (1854-1934)
- Born: c. 1822
- Died: 1907
- Known for: Battle of the Little Bighorn

Red Horse was a sub-chief of the Miniconjou Sioux. He fought in the 1876 Battle of the Little Bighorn, and in 1881 he gave one of the few detailed accountings of the event. He also drew pictographs of the Little Bighorn Battle. Red Horse married twice and had three children.

== Ledger drawings ==
Red Horse drew 42 ledger book drawings illustrating the Battle of Little Big Horn. The drawings are held in the Smithsonian Institution's National Anthropological Archives, and a selection has been exhibited at the Cantor Art Center at Stanford University in the exhibition, Red Horse: Drawings of the Battle of the Little Bighorn. The drawings were commissioned by Charles E. McChesney, an Army doctor. The drawings were made in 1881. They were drawn with colored pencil on the manilla paper.

The drawings show hand-to-hand warfare in a brutally honest manner, and have been described as "the most trustworthy sort of visual depiction we have of the battle" that does not centralize General George Custer's role in the fighting.

== Works ==
- "The Battle of Little Bighorn: An Eyewitness Account by the Lakota Chief Red Horse Recorded in Pictographs and Text at the Cheyenne River Reservation, 1881," Archives of the West, www.pbs.org/
