= Bear's Heart =

Native American artist

- Náhkȯhehēsta
- Born: c. 1851
- Died: 1882
- Known for: ledger art

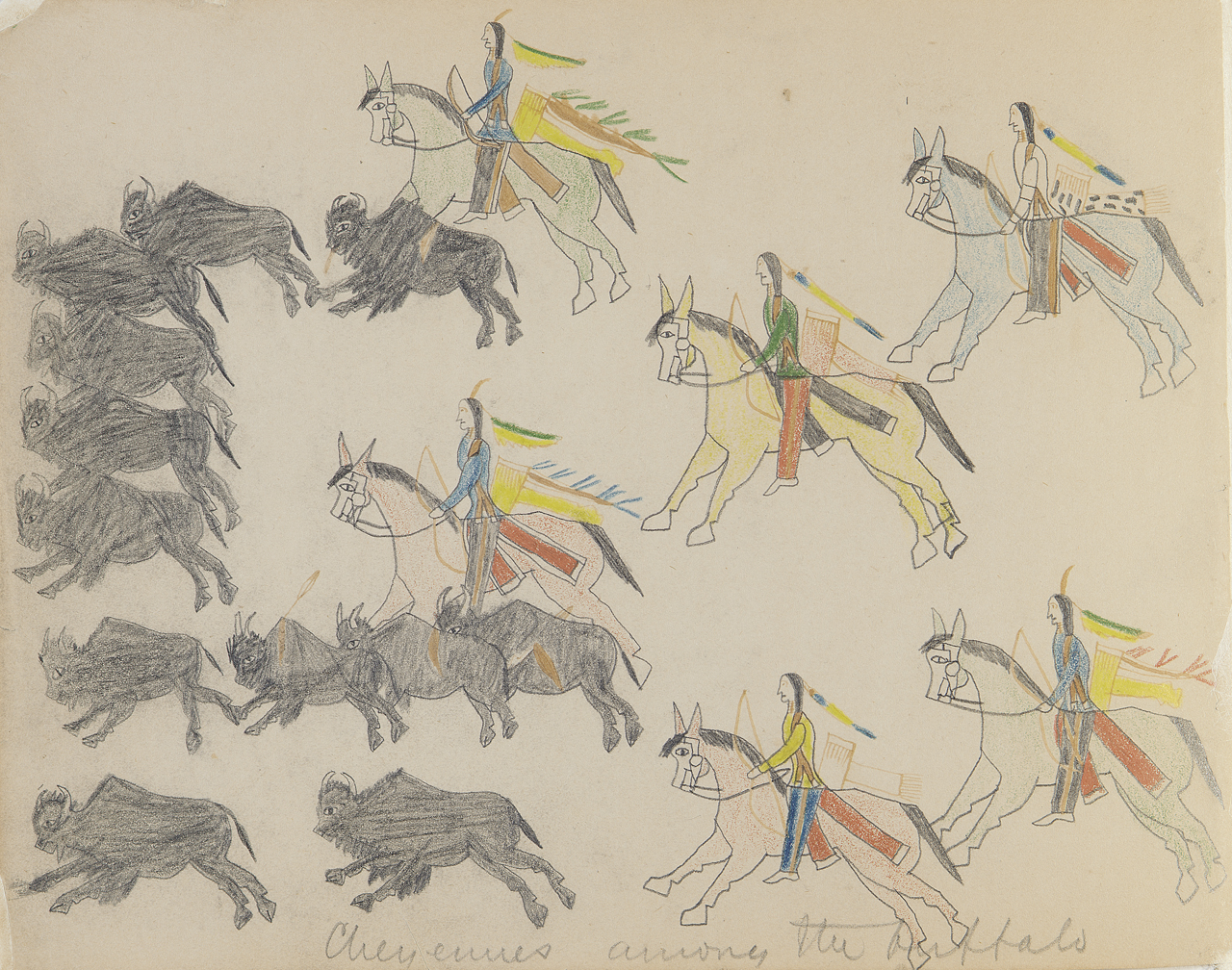
Bear's Heart, “Cheyennes Among the Buffalo” (1875)

Bear's Heart (Cheyenne: Náhkȯhehēsta, also transcribed as Nock-ko-ist; c. 1851–1882) was a Cheyenne ledger book artist who was one of 72 Native Americans to be imprisoned in 1875 at Fort Marion, in St. Augustine, Florida. While imprisoned, he created a series of drawings on ledger book pages using ink and colored pencils. In November 1876 he created a set of drawings known as the Bear's Heart Ledger Book.

== Early life ==
Bear's Heart was born in about 1851 into the Cheyenne tribe. After his father died he joined a group of 20 other young men to fight the Utes in Colorado. In 1874 he rode with the war leader, Medicine Water. In November of that year, he camped with Grey Beard's encampment. In December he was taken prisoner and transferred in chains to Fort Sill. He and over seventy other prisoners were taken to a railroad station 165 miles away where they were then chained to eight army wagons.

== Ledger book drawings ==
During his imprisonment, he made many drawings on ledger book pages using colored pencil and ink. In November 1876 he made a group of drawings known as the Bear's Heart Ledger Book. He was given his own drawing book, which was unusual at the time, as other artists shared the use of discarded accounting ledger books to create their drawings. The 24 drawings in his book were rendered in graphite and crayon. Lieutenant Richard Henry Pratt wrote notations on the drawings. This work documented the American military occupation of Native lands and daily life at Fort Marion. He continued to produce drawings from 1875 to 1878 at Fort Marion.

Pratt oversaw 26 prisoner artists at the fort. He took Bear Heart's book to William Tecumseh Sherman as part of an appeal for increased educational support at the Carlisle Indian School. Pratt also sold some of Bear's Heart and other ledger artists' work to tourists to fund "Indian education."

A monograph on his drawings, Bear's Heart: Scenes from the life of a Cheyenne Artist of One Hundred Years Ago with Pictures by Himself, with text by Burton Supree and Ann Ross was published in 1977 by the Museum of the American Indian, Heye Foundation.

== Later life ==
After his release, he was schooled at the Hampton Normal and Agricultural Institute in Virginia. He later returned home to the Cheyenne Arapaho Reservation, which had newly been formed in Oklahoma, where he worked as a carpenter. He died of tuberculosis in the year 1882.

== Collections ==
His work is included in the collections of the Hampton Institute, the Museum of the American Indian, Heye Foundation, the Massachusetts Historical Society, the Oklahoma Art Center, and the Yale University, Beinecke Rare Book and Manuscript Library, among others.

== Gallery ==
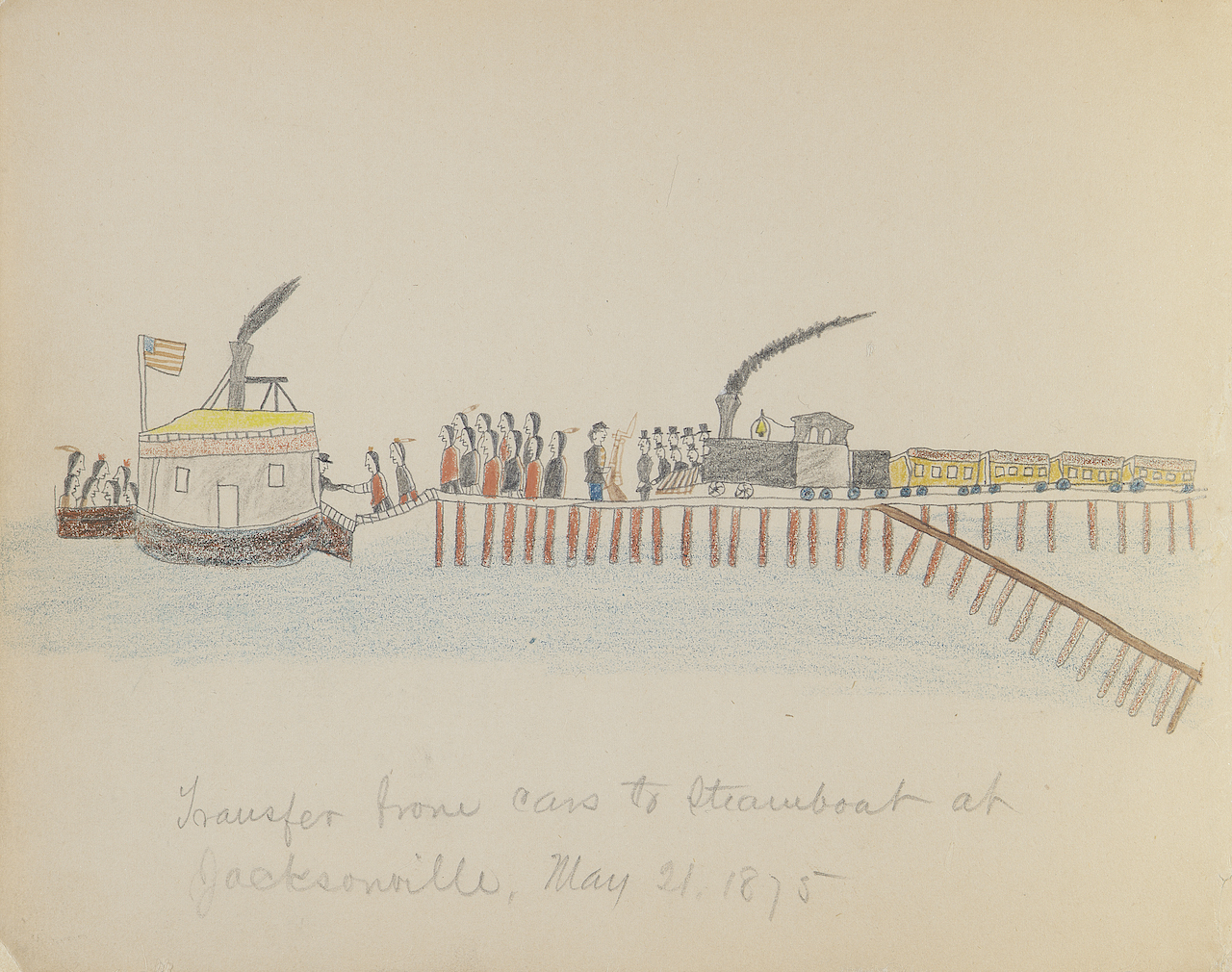
Bears Heart - Transfer from Cars to Seamboat, 1875

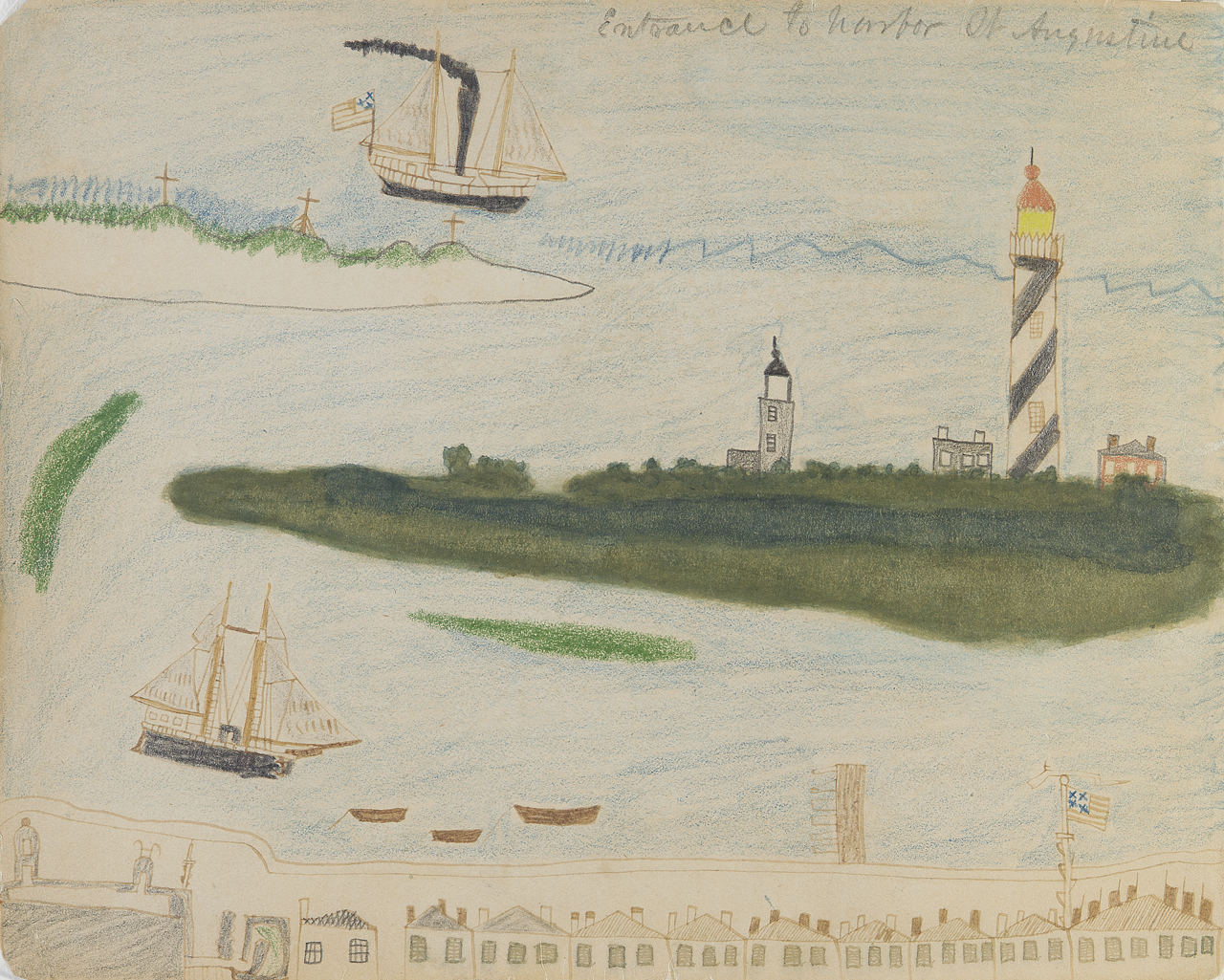
Bears Heart - Entrance to Harbor, 1875

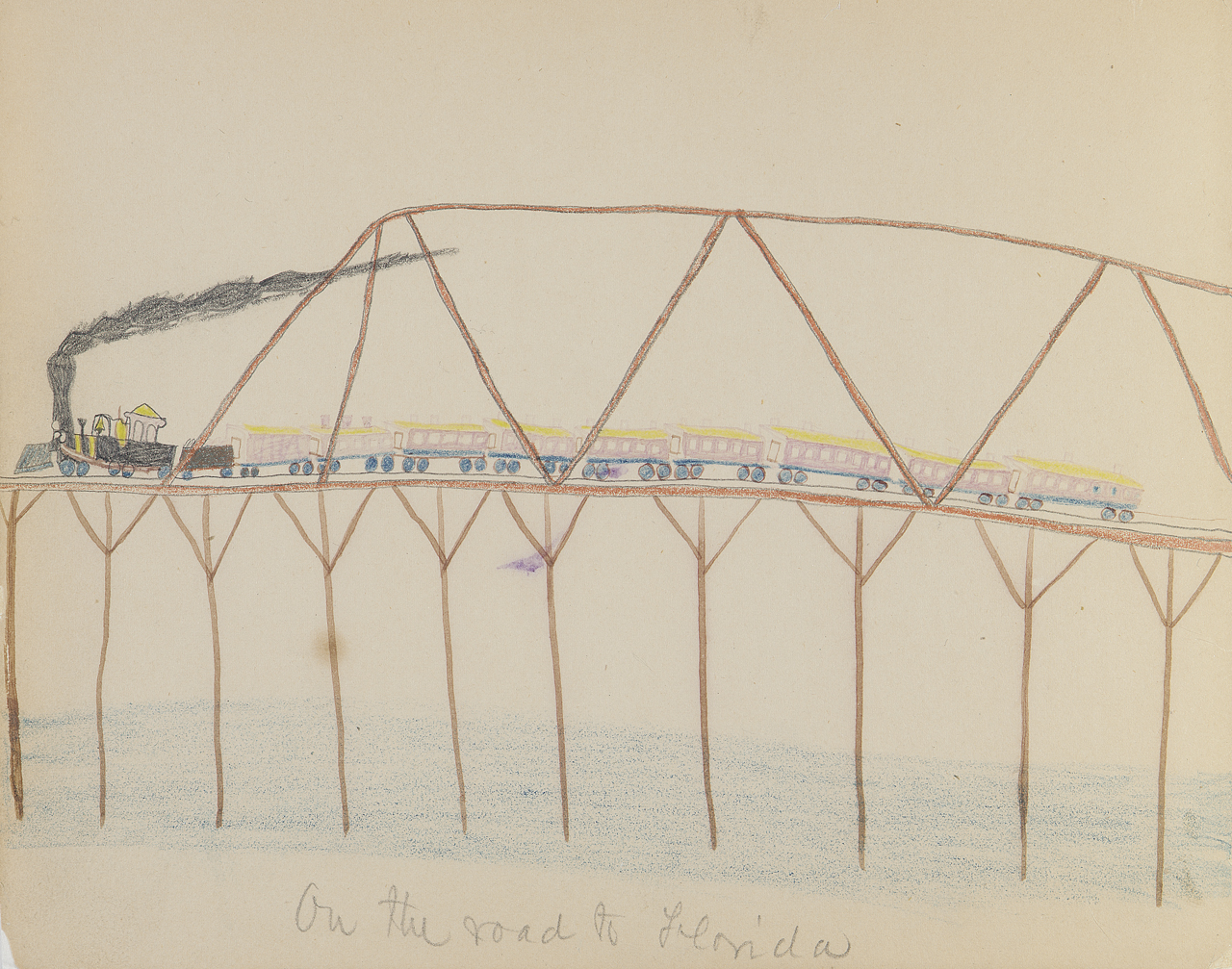
Bears Heart - On the Road to Florida, 1875

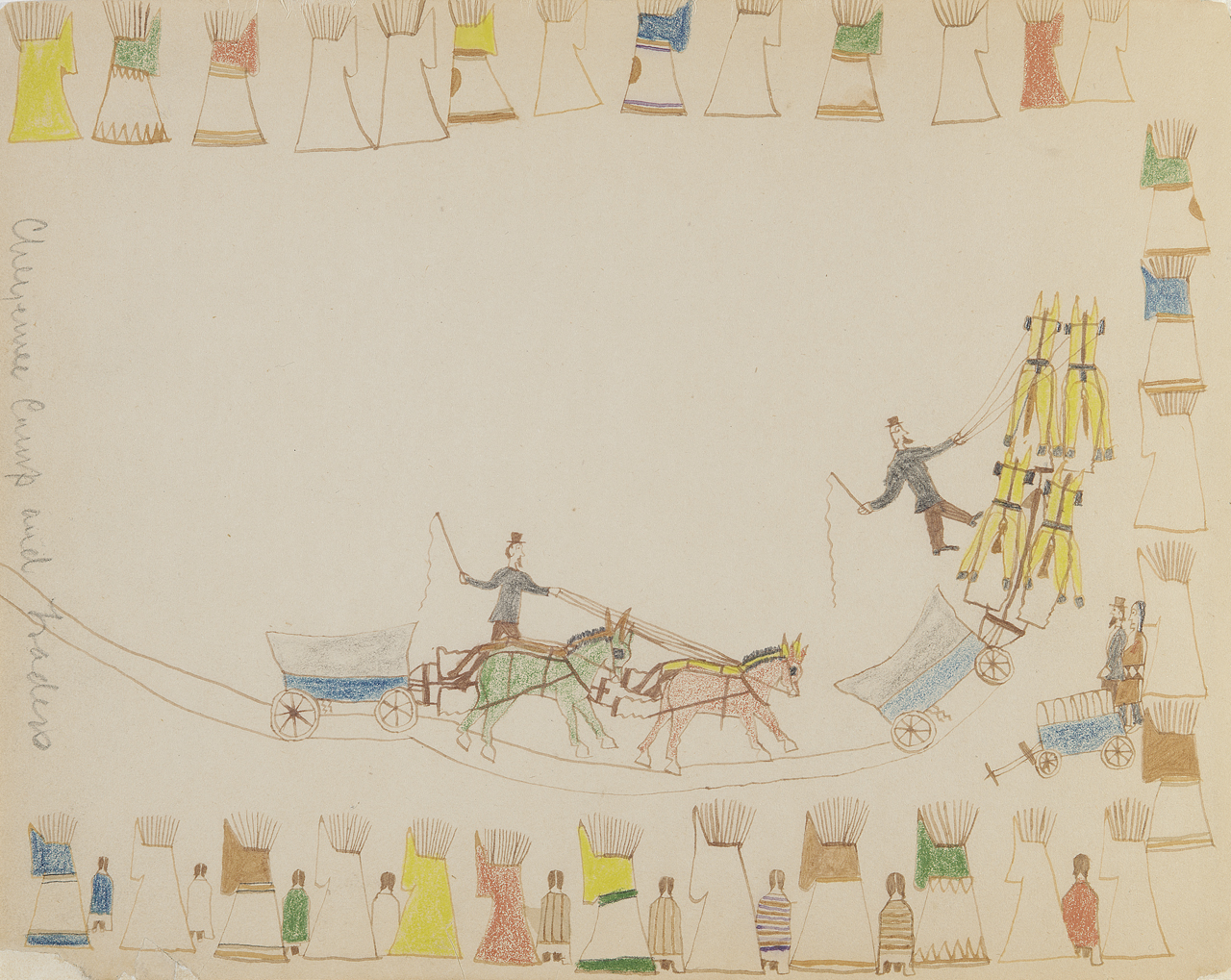
Bears Heart - Cheyennes Camp, 1875

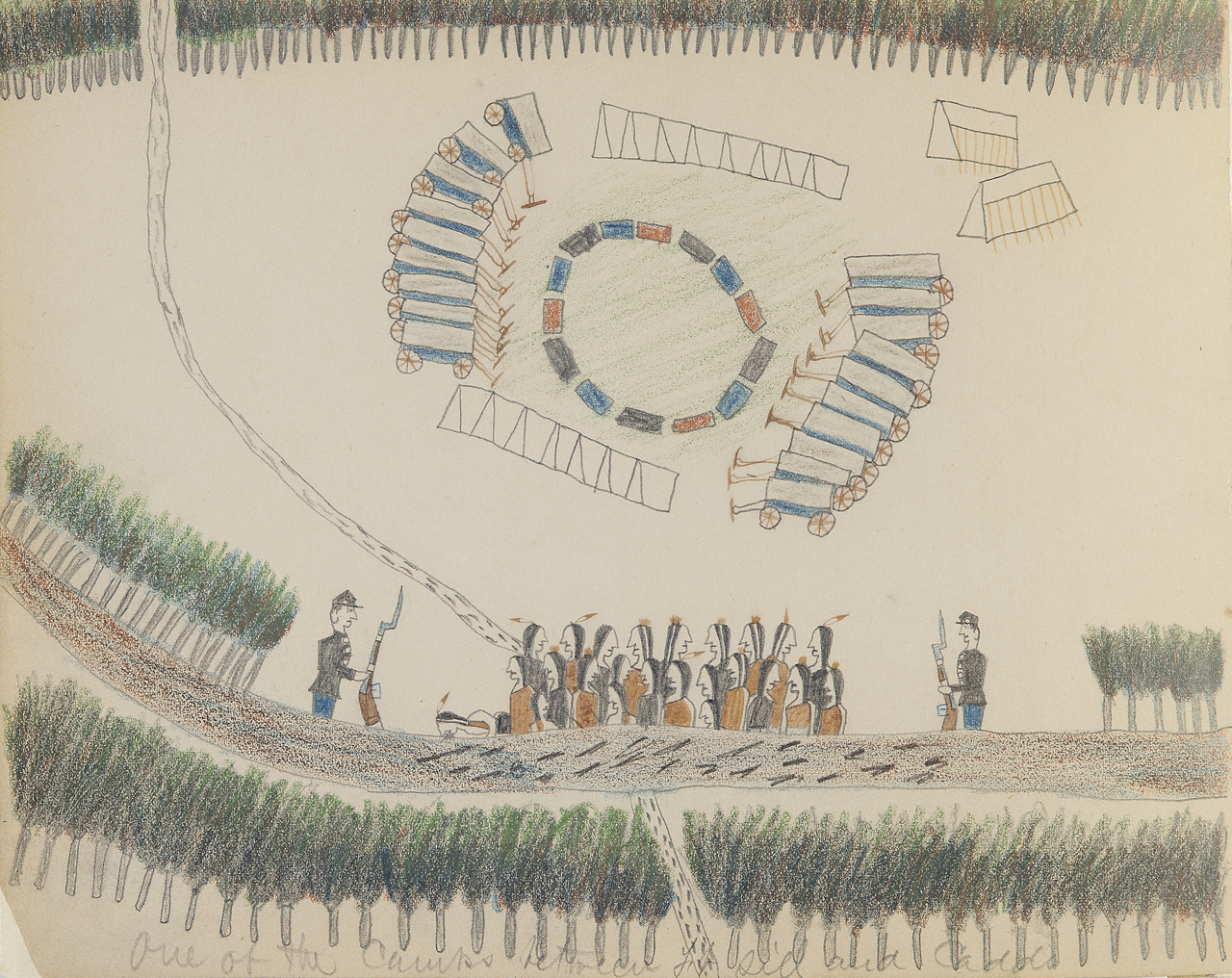
Bears Heart - One of the Camps Between Ft. Sill and Caddo, 1875

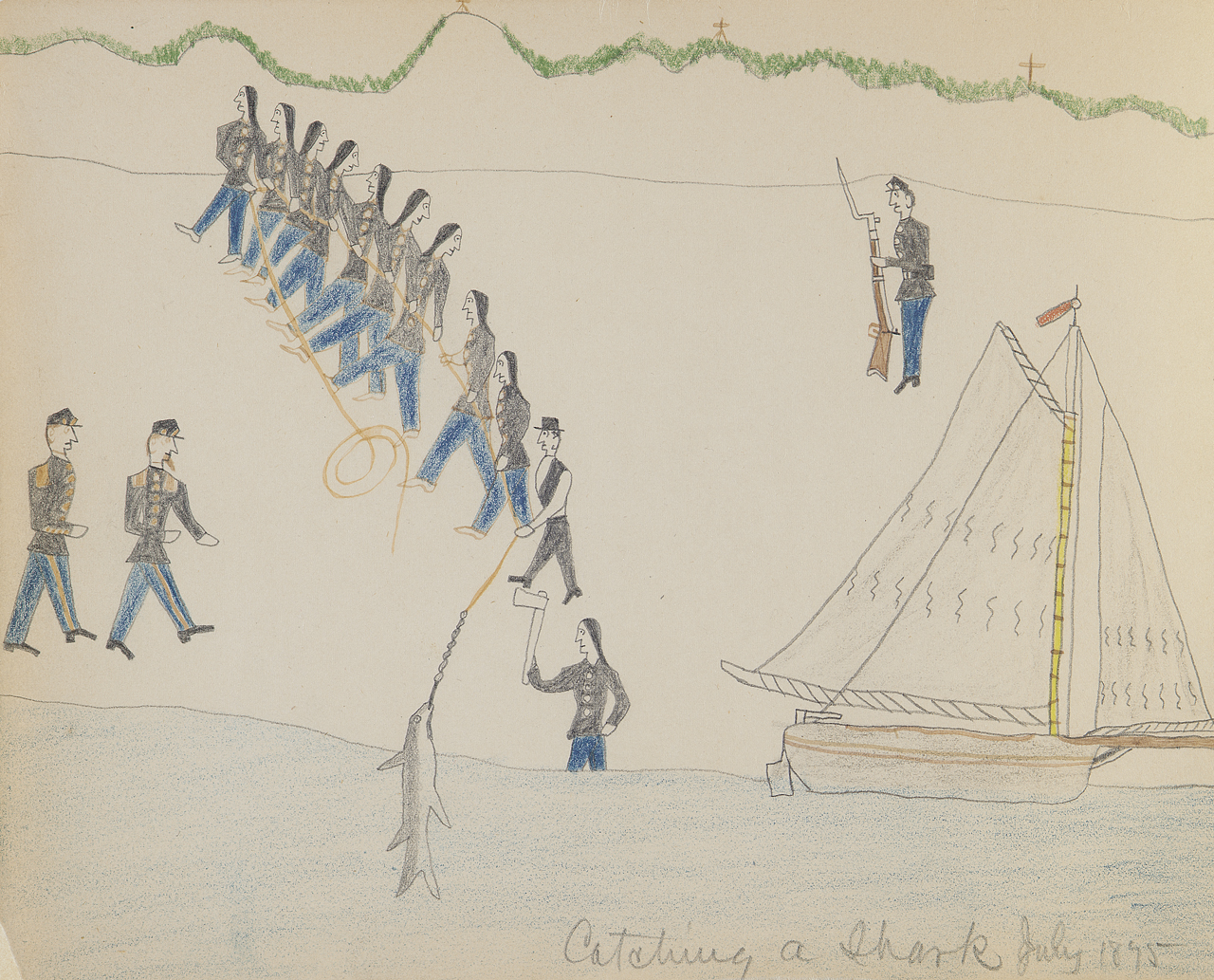
Bears Heart - Catching a Shark, 1875
