= Howling Wolf (Cheyenne) =

Native American painter

- Ho'néenéstoohe
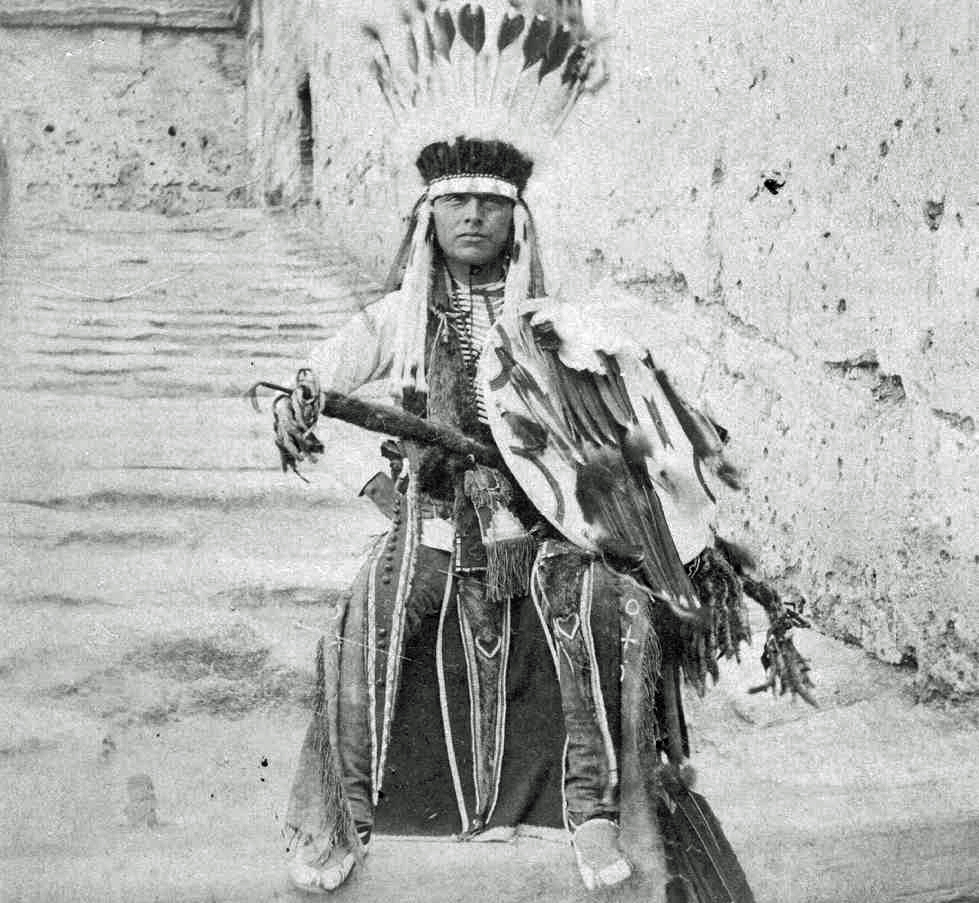
- Howling Wolf while imprisoned at Fort Marion
- Born: Ho-na-nist-to c. 1849
- Died: July 5, 1927 (aged about 77–78); Oklahoma, US
- Education: Self-taught
- Known for: Painter
- Movement: Ledger art

Howling Wolf (Cheyenne: Ho'néenéstoohe, also transcribed Ho-na-nist-to; c. 1849 – July 5, 1927) was a Southern Cheyenne warrior who was a member of Black Kettle's band and was present at the Sand Creek Massacre in Colorado. After being imprisoned in the Fort Marion in Saint Augustine, Florida in 1875, Howling Wolf became a proficient artist in a style known as ledger art for the accounting ledger books in which the drawings were done.

== Sand Creek Massacre ==
Howling Wolf, along with his father Eagle Head (Minimic), were in the Southern Cheyenne camp on Sand Creek in Colorado Territory on the morning of November 29, 1864, when they were attacked by Colonel John Chivington and the First Regiment of Colorado Volunteers. The camp was caught off guard as Black Kettle was instructed to camp there by the U.S. Army and most of the braves were out on a hunt.

Howling Wolf, who was only 15 at the time, and Eagle Head, were among the few warriors to defend against the unprovoked attack. The approximate number of deaths amongst the Southern Cheyenne and allied Arapaho (some of which were in Black Kettle's camp) is 137, most of whom were women and children. Chivington's troops committed numerous atrocities at what is known to history as the Sand Creek Massacre, including mutilating the corpses of the dead, such as cutting out the genitalia of a murdered Cheyenne woman and stretching it over the front of a hat.

Damn any man who sympathizes with Indians! ... I have come to kill Indians, and believe it is right and honorable to use any means under God's heaven to kill Indians.

— Col. John Milton Chivington, U.S. Army

== Prisoner of war ==
In 1875, Howling Wolf and Eagle Head were among a group of 33 Southern Cheyenne, 11 Comanche, 27 Kiowa and one Caddo imprisoned at Fort Sill, Oklahoma. They were then taken by eight prison wagons to Fort Leavenworth, Kansas and placed upon a special train to carry them east to imprisonment in the old Spanish fort in St. Augustine, Florida renamed Fort Marion by the U.S. Army. Along the way one Cheyenne, Suh-tai, attempted suicide but was thwarted in his efforts only to be shot and killed attempting to escape.

== Artwork ==
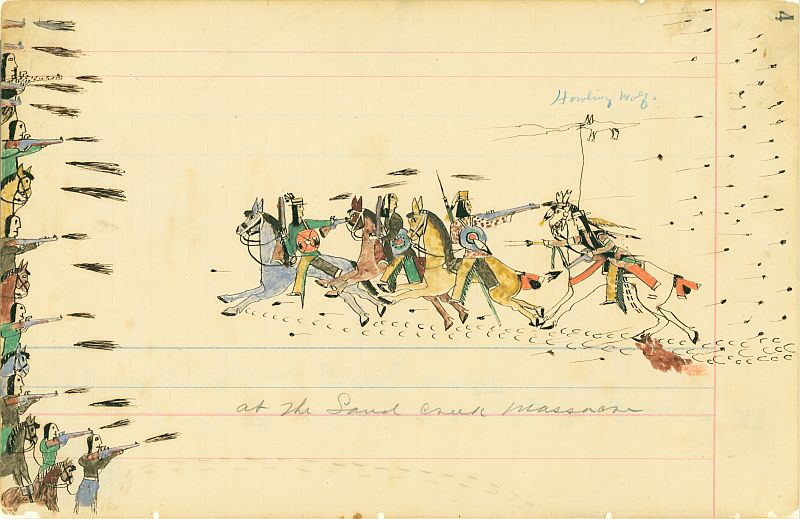
At the Sand Creek Massacre, 1874–1875 by Howling Wolf

While at Fort Marion, Howling Wolf became a proficient artist in what came to be termed ledger art, so-called as the drawings were done on paper from accountants' ledgers, the most readily available source of paper at the time.

The drawings were evocative of traditional Plains hide painting. The artwork was sold to tourists in St. Augustine who visited the fort. Howling Wolf's artwork along with the other ledger artists has risen in monetary value through the years and is valued as an expressive eyewitness account of the experiences of the artists and their tribes.

== Later life ==
In addition to becoming an artist, Howling Wolf was made a sergeant in charge of the Indian guard at the fort, a unit made up of the Native American prisoners. While he was at Fort Marion he along with other captives under the tutelage and supervision of Captain Richard Henry Pratt received traditional American schooling in diverse subjects such as reading and writing English.

Howling Wolf would spend three full years in captivity before he was released in 1878 and returned to Oklahoma to live upon the Cheyenne reservation. He originally intended to stay in the East to continue his education however his failing eyesight, (treatment for which he sailed to Boston for an operation) prompted his return to the reservation.

In 1881, Howling Wolf became disillusioned with the habits and customs he had adapted of the white European Americans. He returned to wearing native Cheyenne dress and along with other Cheyenne such as Roman Nose became involved in the Native American Church.

== Death ==
Howling Wolf died in 1927 in a car accident while on his way home to Oklahoma after performing in a Wild West show in Houston, Texas.

== See also ==
- List of Native American artists
- Visual arts by indigenous peoples of the Americas
