= Norman Akers =

Native American artist

Norman Akers is a Native American artist known for his landscape works that incorporate cultural, historical and contemporary visuals of Native American life. He is a member of the Osage Nation and currently teaches painting in the Department of Visual Art at the University of Kansas.

== Biography ==
Norman Akers was born in Fairfax, Oklahoma and is a citizen of the Osage Nation. In 1982, Akers received his BFA in Painting from the Kansas City Art Institute. The next year Akers received a certificate in Museum studies from the Institute of American Arts. In 1991, Akers received an MFA from the University of Illinois.

== Artistic process ==
Akers's artwork is inspired by his background as a Native American and what it means culturally to be an Indian. He has stated that he interprets his art as a form of cultural expression that tie to his views politically and historically, while maintaining a contemporary form. The art often includes references to multiple perspectives or interpretations and how these ideas are used to identify spiritual places. Akers has specified that there is no certain physical place or destination, as it represents the spiritual origin these images bring him and relate to him culturally. Akers will use maps in his work, which he has described as an expression for spiritual connection to physical places he has yet discovered.

His work also takes inspiration from current mainstream ideas of "immigrants" and what it means to be "illegal" in the present day world and his desire to question these ideas.

== Exhibitions ==
=== Group exhibitions ===
- Stories From the Land, Mingenback Gallery and the Birger Sandzen Memorial Gallery, in Lindsborg, Kansas (February 11, 2019 – March 15, 2019)
- Revisions: Contemporary Native American Art, Snite Museum of Art, University of Notre Dame, Notre Dame, Indiana (February 2, 2019 - May 18, 2019)
- (RE)CLAIM: Indigenous Artist Reflect on Identity, Nelson Atkins Museum of Art, Kansas City, Missouri (December 14, 2018 - June 16, 2018)
- Art for a New Understanding Native Voices 1950's to Now, Crystal Bridges Museum of American Art, Bentonville, Arkansas (October 6, 2018 - January 7, 2019)
- In/Sight, Sherry Leedy Contemporary Art Museum, Kansas City, Missouri (September 7, 2018 - October 20, 2018)

=== Solo exhibitions ===
- Norman Akers Navigates the Space Between, Nerman Museum of Contemporary Art, Overland Park, Kansas (2026)
- Norman Akers: Printed Borders, Phoenix Gallery Underground, Lawrence, KS (2019)
- Norman Akers: Contested Territories, Percolator Art Space, Lawrence, KS (2015)
- Survey, Mingenback Art Gallery, Bethany College, Lindsborg, KS (2013)

== Permanent collections ==
- Birmingham Museum of Art, Birmingham, AL
- Library of Congress, Print Collection, Washington DC
- Arrowhead Stadium Art Collection, Kansas City, MO
- Armenia Eiteljorg Museum of American and Western Art, Indianapolis, IN
- Fine Arts Center, Eastern Wyoming College, Torrington, WY
- Denver Art Museum, Denver, CO
- Nelson Atkins Museum of Art, Kansas City, MO

== See also ==
- Visual arts by indigenous peoples of the Americas
