= Timothy Nuvangyaoma =

Hopi politician and firefighter

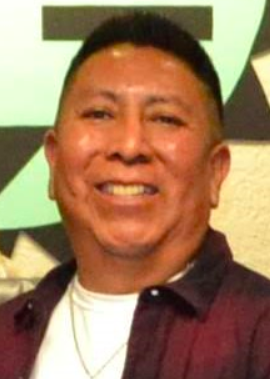

Chairperson of the Hopi Reservation
- Incumbent
- Assumed office November 2017
- Preceded by: Herman Honanie

Personal details
- Born: 1970 (age 55–56) Keams Canyon, Arizona, U.S.
- Party: Democratic
- Occupation: Politician, firefighter

Timothy Nuvangyaoma (Hopi: Muytala; born 1970) is a Hopi politician and firefighter. He serves as the chairperson and tribal leader of the Hopi Tribe in Arizona in the United States.

== Career before politics ==
Nuvangyaoma is a former wildland fire fighter. He also worked in finance and was a volunteer for KUYI.

== Political career ==
=== 2018 election ===
Nuvangyaoma ran to unseat incumbent Herman Honanie. Nuvangyaoma won by a "wide margin" and was sworn in on December 1, 2018. Honanie challenged the election, saying that Nuvangyaoma should have never been allowed to run for office because he had been arrested for driving under the influence in 2007. Honanie believes this violates the Hopi constitution, which disallows someone running for chairperson if they have had a felony conviction within ten years. The election board did not reject Nuvangyaoma's application to run because his name was misspelled in the court records.

=== Tenure ===
Nuvangyaoma advocates for the continuation of the Special Diabetes Program for Indians, which has helped decrease diabetes rates amongst the Hopi nation since 2013. Nuvangyaoma has led efforts to repatriate cultural objects that were taken from sacred Hopi sites and are now held in museum collections. In October 2018, objects were successfully repatriated from the Finnish National Museum.

In March 2020, during the COVID-19 pandemic, Oraibi village had a new water well installed with CARES Act funds. Nuvangyaoma opposes the reservation being used for early COVID-19 vaccinations, stating in an interview with NBC News that “We already have the coronavirus here and I’m not going to subject my community members to be used as test models for something unless it’s safe.”

Nuvangyaoma, along with other tribal leaders, met with Kamala Harris and Joe Biden in October during the 2020 presidential campaign. After the meeting, Nuvangyaoma and other tribal leaders endorsed the Biden-Harris ticket. A few weeks later, the Hopi received a multi-million dollar grant from the Bureau of Indian Affairs to improve reservation water quality, triggered by his desire to remove arsenic from tribal water.

== Personal life ==
Nuvangyaoma has been arrested multiple times for alcohol-related offenses. In 2007, he was arrested for driving under the influence. He served time in prison and was released in 2014.
