= Waldo Mootzka =

Hopi painter

- Portrait of Mootzka c. 1935
- Born: 1903; Oraibi
- Died: 1940 (aged 36–37); Phoenix
- Occupations: Painter, silversmith, illustrator

Waldo Mootzka (1903–1940) was a Hopi artist known for his watercolor paintings of Hopi spiritual and ritual tradition.

== Early life ==
Waldo Mootzka was born in 1903 into the Hopi tribe near New Oraibi, Arizona, also known as Third Mesa on the Hopi Reservation. His father was Tom (Koyawiseoma) Mootzka and his mother was Alice (Shengoinse)—who was a member of the Badger Clan. A recording from the 1920 Census records that Waldo had three sisters: Daisy, Amelia, and Norma.

While attending the Oraibi day school, Mootzka met fellow student Fred Kabotie, and is believed to have been influenced by his style of watercolor painting. As he grew older, Mootzka was sent to a boarding school in Albuquerque that aimed to assimilate Native American children and eradicate Hopi cultural practices. He continued his studies in Shungopovi, known as Second Mesa on Hopiland.

== Career ==
Eagle Katsina Dancers with Mudheads

Zuni Rain God

In a 1935 interview, Mootzka said that he had always known how to draw and paint. Though he had observed his classmates' painting early in his life, Mootzka never received formal training in watercolor.

He is considered among the first generation of Hopi painters, and his style has been described as "experimental" in its mixture of flat-Pueblo style, art deco and cubist motifs. His work received acclaim and appeared in a series of group exhibitions in his lifetime.

Mootzka's Hopi upbringing inspired much of his early subject matter. His paintings depict Hopi life and its ceremonies, and are filled with spirtial figures such as kachina dancers. These unique Hopi religious figures differ from those of the Pueblo peoples living the Rio Grande valley, as the Hopi were less influenced by Catholicism due to their remote location on three mesa tops in Arizona.

Mootzka's work attracted the attention of anthropologist John Louw Nelson, who spent eight years living amongst the Hopi and documenting their ceremonies. Nelson includes several of Mootzka's illustrations of Hopi ceremonies in his 1937 study, Rhythm for Rain. A review of Nelson's newly-released book in the New Yorker made note of the book's "[u]nusual illustrations."

In the 1930s, Mootzka settled in Santa Fe and began working out of Dorythy Dunn's Studio. Dunn, an Anglo teacher at Santo Domingo Pueblo, founded the center to support young Native American artists. Mootzka's works of this period are often used as key examples of the Studio style.

In Santa Fe, Mootzka met skilled silversmith, Frank Patania Sr., who had come to the Southwest to recover from tuberculosis. Patania taught and sponsored Mootzka in the art of silversmithing. Mootzka worked for Patania in his Thunderbird Shop and increasingly dedicated more of his time to silversmithing until his death in 1940.

== Death ==
In 1940, Mootzka was killed in a car accident in Phoenix at the age of 38. He was buried on his homestead in New Oraibi.

== Collections ==
- Brooklyn Museum
- McNay Art Museum
- Museum of the American Indian in New York
- Gilcrease Museum Institute and the Philbrook Art Center in Tulsa, Oklahoma
- Museum of Fine Arts, Houston
- Museum of Northern Arizona, Flagstaff, Arizona
- National Museum of the American Indian
- Southwest Museum, Los Angeles, California
