= Victor Masayesva Jr. =

Hopi filmmaker, photographer, and video artist

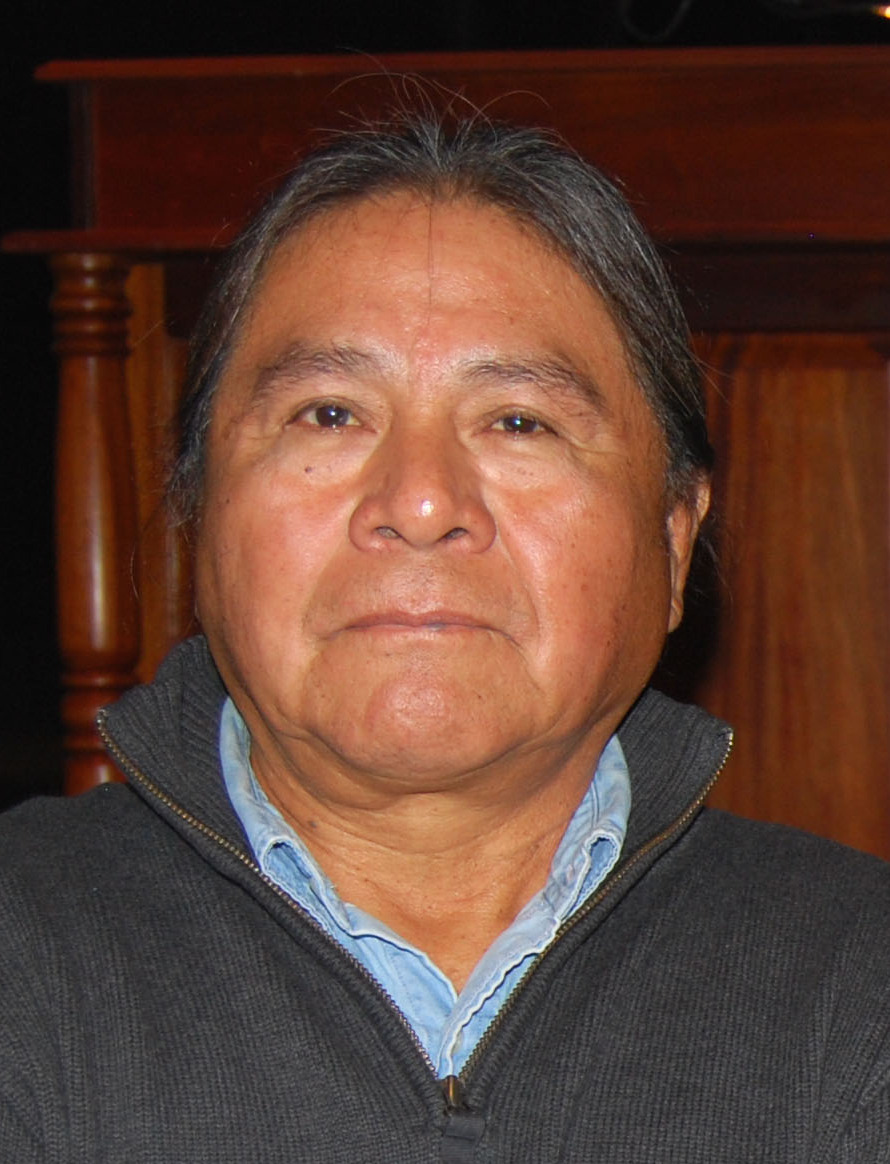
- Victor Masayesva in 2012
- Born: 1951 (age 74–75); Hotevilla, Arizona
- Citizenship: Hopi Tribe of Arizona and American
- Education: Princeton University, University of Arizona
- Known for: photography, filmmaker

Victor Masayesva Jr. (born 1951) is a Hopi filmmaker, video artist, and photographer. Masayesva's artistic career promotes Hopi culture. The majority of his films are in the Hopi language.

== Early life and education ==
Masayesva was born on the Hopi Reservation of Arizona and grew up in Hotevilla, Arizona. As a teenager, Masayesva was recruited to attend the Horace Mann School in New York. He later studied Hopi ceremonies and English at Princeton University and pursued graduate studies in English and photography at the University of Arizona.

== Career ==
Following his studies, Masayesva became the director of Hotevilla's Ethnic Heritage Program, where, in 1980, he created a program to teach Hopi language. In 1982, the documentary short Hopiit was created from footage he had shot during the Ethnic Heritage program. Masayesva's first film is intended for presenting a "montage of different views of Hopi landscapes and people during the cycle of a year."

In Masayesva's first feature-length documentary created in 1985, Itam Hakim, Hopiit, a tribal elder from the Hopi historian's clan recounts stories of Hopi history and philosophy, which Masayesva interprets through visual imagery. Made to commemorate the Hopi tercentennial 1680–1980, the film received funding from the German national television ZDF. Although initially released in Hopi in the United States, after receiving distribution opportunities, Masayesva created an English version.

In 1988, Ritual Clowns is a film that uses computer animation. His next two documentaries were commissioned for museums, and both explore traditions in Native American ceramic-making: Pott Starr (1990), which also incorporates animation, and Siskyavi: The Place of Chasms (1991).

The 1993 film Imagining Indians was shot on 16 mm film with an entirely Native-American crew. The documentary critiques representations of Native Americans in Hollywood and other forms of media. Masayesva visited indigenous communities in the United States and the Amazon to produce the film. It is considered one of Masayesva's "best-known and most critically debated films."

== Awards and honors ==
Masayesva received one of the first Intercultural Media Fellowships from the Rockefeller Foundation. He has received the University of Arizona Distinguished Alumni Award, the Gold Hugo at the Chicago International Film Festival, the Two Rivers Visionary Award, the Taos Festival's filmmaker award, and the American Film Institute's Maya Deren Award.

His video work has appeared in the Native American Film and Video Festival, the Museum of Modern Art New York, the Long Beach Museum of Art, the World Wide Video Festival, the Whitney Museum of American Art Biennial, Haus der Kulturen der Welt Berlin, the San Francisco Art Institute, and the American Indian Contemporary Arts Festival 2000.

In 2022, his film Itam Hakim, Hopiit was selected for preservation in the National Film Registry by the Library of Congress.

== Filmography ==
Film	Year	Duration (minutes)
Hopiit	1982	15
Itam Hakim, Hopiit	1985	58
Ritual Clowns	1988	18
Pott Starr	1990	6
SISKYAVI - The place of Chasms	1991	28
Imagining Indians	1992	30
Two Faces of One Room	1992	30
TRANS-VOICES	1992	24
Paatuwaqatsi - Water, Land and Life	2007	57
