= Helen Sekaquaptewa =

Native American and Mormon storyteller/writer

- Tuwawisnöm
- Born: 1898; Oraibi, Arizona, United States of America
- Died: 1990 (aged 91–92); Kykotsmovi Village, Arizona, United States of America
- Notable work: Me and Mine: The Life Story of Helen Sekaquaptewa
- Children: Emory Sekaquaptewa, Marlene Sekaquaptewa, Abbott Sekaquaptewa Wayne Phillip Sekaquaptewa

Helen Sekaquaptewa (1898–1990), was a Hopi Mormon homemaker, matriarch and storyteller, best known for her as-told-to memoir, Me and Mine: The Life Story of Helen Sekaquaptewa, which was compiled by her friend Louise Udall based on Sekaquaptewa's recollections.

== Life ==
Helen Sekaquaptewa was born in the Hopi village of Oraibi into the "Hostiles", a Hopi faction who fought against colonial assimilation. After the faction was ousted from Oraibi, she was forced to attend a Native American boarding school. When she returned after high-school, Sekaquaptewa rejected her family's traditionalist Hopi values and married her husband, Emory, in order to live biculturally. They married in 1919, with both a traditional Hopi and a Christian marriage ceremony. Settling down in Hotevilla, Emory became a tribal judge while Helen involved herself in social welfare work and community building. In 1951, after being taught by Elders she had come into contact with as a result of her son Abbott's hospitalization the year prior, she converted to The Church of Jesus Christ of Latter-day Saints. Following her conversion, she became highly active in the Relief Society.

=== Me and Mine: The Life Story of Helen Sekaquaptewa ===
Sekaquaptewa first met Louise Udall after moving to Phoenix, Arizona to further her children's education. Sekaquaptewa and Udall became friends through the Relief Society, and Udall would write down the stories Helen told her about her life. Me and Mine describes Sekaquaptewa's life-long struggle with her identity, having to navigate the Hopi traditionalism of the "Hostiles" and the cultural assimilation of American colonialism. However, it also discusses how she found ways to bridge and reconcile these identities within her spiritual beliefs and social practices. For example, Sekaquaptewa viewed her Mormon faith as a confirmation of traditional Hopi spiritual beliefs.

In her 2014 dissertation, Autobiographical Indiscipline: Queering American Indian Life Narratives, Alicia Carroll presents Me and Mine as an example of autobiographical indiscipline, a decolonial practice she identifies in some as-told-to autobiographies of Native Americans. Carroll writes: "Me and Mine literalizes Helen as a person whose self fails to conform to colonial American standards of individualism; whose life refuses to be confined to the timeline between her birth and death; and whose written story harbors oral traditions in the printed product."

== Legacy ==
In 2004, Sekaquaptewa was included in the fifth volume of Notable American Women. In 2013, she was inducted into the Arizona Women's Hall of Fame. The chapter, "My Church", in which she describes her interactions with Mormon missionaries and her eventual conversion to The Church of Jesus Christ of Latter-day Saints, was included in The Columbia Sourcebook of Mormons in the United States. Her daughter, Marlene, was an influential Hopi tribal leader. Her son, Emory, was a Hopi anthropologist known for his contributions to the first Hopi language dictionary.
