= Cedar Unified School District =

School district in Arizona, United States

Address
- Mile Post 408 Highway 264 Keams Canyon, Arizona, 86034; United States

District information
- Type: Public
- Grades: PreK–12
- NCES District ID: 0401810

Students and staff
- Students: 105
- Teachers: 10.5
- Staff: 21.5
- Student–teacher ratio: 10.0

Other information
- Website: www.cedarusd.org

Cedar Unified School District is a school district based in Navajo County of northeastern Arizona.

The school district serves some unincorporated areas of Navajo County, including:

- Hopi Reservation communities of First Mesa, Hotevilla-Bacavi, Kykotsmovi Village, Second Mesa, and Shongopovi.
- Navajo Nation community of Jeddito.
- Town of Keams Canyon.
- A portion of Whitecone

== Schools ==
The lone school currently within the district is the Jeddito School, which serves grades K-8, in Jeddito on the Navajo Nation.

White Cone High School, the first public district high school in Keams Canyon, opened in 2005 but fell victim to financial difficulties within the district and closed in 2012.

== See also ==
- Hopi Junior/Senior High School
