= Jeddito, Arizona =

CDP in Navajo County, Arizona

Jeddito, Arizona Jádító (Navajo)
- CDP
- Location in Navajo County and the state of Arizona

- Location in the United States
- Coordinates: 35°45′20″N 110°07′25″W
- Country: United States
- State: Arizona
- County: Navajo

Area
  - Total: 5.42 sq mi (14.04 km^{2})
  - Land: 5.42 sq mi (14.03 km^{2})
  - Water: 0.0039 sq mi (0.01 km^{2})
- Elevation: 6,277 ft (1,913 m)

Population (2020)
  - Total: 346
  - Density: 63.9/sq mi (24.66/km^{2})
- Time zone: UTC-7 (MST)
  - Summer (DST): UTC-6 (MDT)
- ZIP code: 86034
- Area code: 928
- FIPS code: 04-36150
- GNIS feature ID: 2408440

Jeddito (Navajo: Jádító) is a census-designated place (CDP) in Navajo County, Arizona, United States. The population was 293 at the 2010 census.

== Geography ==
According to the United States Census Bureau, the CDP has a total area of 5.6 square miles (15 km^{2}), all land.

Jeddito lies within a 123 km^{2} (47 sq mi) exclave of the Navajo Nation. This exclave is surrounded by territory of the Hopi Indian Reservation, which is itself surrounded by the Navajo Nation.

== Demographics ==
Historical population
Census	Pop.	Note	%±
2000	390		—
2010	293		−24.9%
2020	346		18.1%
U.S. Decennial Census

Languages (2000)	Percent
Spoke Navajo at home	72%
Spoke English at home	28%

As of the census of 2000, there were 390 people, 99 households, and 79 families living in the CDP. The population density was 70.0 inhabitants per square mile (27.0/km^{2}). There were 126 housing units at an average density of 22.6 per square mile (8.7/km^{2}). The racial makeup of the CDP was 6% White, 93% Native American, 0% Asian, 0% from other races, and 1% from two or more races. 1% of the population were Hispanic or Latino of any race.

There were 99 households, out of which 60% had children under the age of 18 living with them, 46% were married couples living together, 30% had a female householder with no husband present, and 20% were non-families. 17% of all households were made up of individuals, and 1% had someone living alone who was 65 years of age or older. The average household size was 3.9 and the average family size was 4.5.

In the CDP, the population was spread out, with 49% under the age of 18, 8% from 18 to 24, 27% from 25 to 44, 14% from 45 to 64, and 3% who were 65 years of age or older. The median age was 19 years. For every 100 females, there were 77 males. For every 100 females age 18 and over, there were 82 males.

The median income for a household in the CDP was $20,417, and the median income for a family was $12,778. Males had a median income of $35,375 versus $30,469 for females. The per capita income for the CDP was $5,347. About 42% of families and 46% of the population were below the poverty line, including 56% of those under age 18 and 25% of those age 65 or over.

== Education ==
Jeddito is a part of the Cedar Unified School District.

The Navajo name of Jádító (Antelope Water) was derived from nearby watering points, which were frequently used by antelopes. Most families living within the Jeddito "island" are members of the extended families who were forcefully evicted from the old Hopi Reservation (District 6) in September and October 1944. This marked the first mass relocation of Navajos determined to be living on the wrong side of the Navajo-Hopi boundary. The portion referred to as Jeddito "island" is totally surrounded by the Hopi Partitioned Land. Another segment of the chapter's land base is part of the main Navajo reservation on the Apache County side. The "island" part is situated exclusively in Navajo County.

White Cone High School served Jeddito until the closure of the school in 2012.
