= Flag of the Hopi Tribe =

Native American flag

Hopi Tribe of Arizona
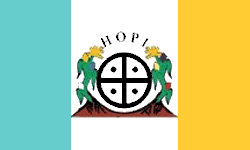
- Naatoyla
- Adopted: January 2002
- Design: Vertical tricolour of turquoise, white, and yellow, with the Hopi symbol in the center
- Designed by: Leigh Kuwanwisiwma

The flag of the Hopi Tribe is used by the Native American Hopi Tribe of Arizona in the United States who live on the Hopi Reservation. The flag is a vertical tricolour of turquoise, white, and yellow, with the Hopi symbol in the middle. The flag is accompanied by a red fringe. The Hopi reservation is surrounded by the Navajo Nation, which is the largest tribe.

== History ==
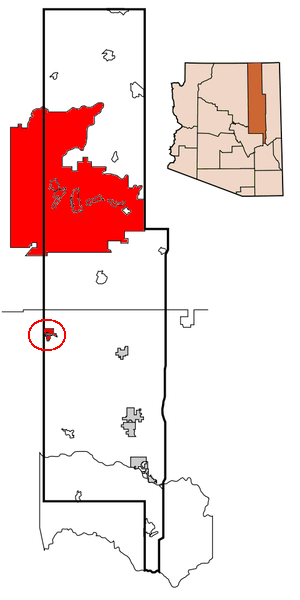
Location of the Hopi Reservation within Navajo and Coconino counties in Arizona

In 2002, Leigh Kuwanwisiwma proposed a tribal flag. Discussions about the adoption of a flag had arisen in 1993, however the current flag was only adopted in the spring of 2002. The design was printed in the tribal newspaper and comments about the flag were encouraged. The flag represents the Hopi way of life and is called the Naatoyla in Hopi.

== Symbolism ==
=== Colors ===
The colors of the Hopi flag represent corn and the Hopi way of life.

- Turquoise (or blue) stripe (sakwa in Hopi): Natwani, all the traditional crops of the Hopi people, continuance of all life, and the duty to provide for family.
- White stripe (qöötsa): Qastiyayngwani, purity in life and balance at the time of creation.
- Yellow stripe (sikyangpu): Sitala, many flowers, for when plant life is rejuvenated, the land is blessed with renewed spirits.

=== Hopi symbol ===
The Tuuwaqatsi or earth symbol is the main symbol of the Hopi people. Says Donald Healy in his book Native American Flags:

Centered on the white stripe is a black ring, divided (north-south and east-west) into four quarters by a black cross. Within each of the quarters is a black dot. Below this Tuuwaqatsi or earth symbol is a depiction of mountains in brown. Two stalks of corn, the main food of the Hopis, emerge from the corners of the mountains. Arcing over this entire symbol is the word "HOPI" in a black typeface.

— Donald T. Healy, Native American Flags, p. 94

== See also ==
- Colorado River Indian Reservation
- Flag of the United States
- Flag of Arizona
- Flag of New Mexico
- Navajo Nation Flag
