= Henry Voth =

Russian-American missionary (1855–1931)

Heinrich (Henry) Richert Voth (15 April 1855 – 2 June 1931) was an ethnographer and Mennonite missionary and minister. He was born in Alexanderwohl, Southern Russia. Voth was sent by the Mission Board of the General Conference Mennonite Church to work among the Arapaho and the Hopi people.

== Life and career ==
Voth learned the Arapaho language and customs at Darlington, Indian Territory, near Fort Reno, where he worked from June 1882 to January 1892. Voth was made superintendent in 1884. He married Barbara Baer from the mission the same year, they had a daughter, Frieda. His wife died in 1889. Voth married Martha Moser, who had also worked at Darlington, in 1892 and they both went to work at Oraibi with the 3rd mesa Hopi, Northern Arizona the next year. Martha Voth died in 1901. Henry Voth had witnessed the Ghost Dance revivalism among his Arapaho congregation. He collected objects and later sold them to the Bureau of American Ethnology. At Oraibi Voth supported many anthropologists from around the world in their Pueblo studies and collected objects for many institutions, for Fred Harvey, but also for the Hamburg and Berlin anthropological museums. His closest collaboration was with George A. Dorsey from Chicago. The Field Museum published Voth's series of precise descriptions of Hopi ceremonies and folklore, illustrated with his Kodak No. 1 photographs. Voth was one of very few non native writers on the Hopi fluent in the Hopi language. Among his papers at Bethel College are his studies in the Arapaho language, Hopi religion, and a Hopi dictionary. Voth left the Hopi and the Heathen Mission field in 1903.

He married Katie Hershler in 1906 and from 1914 to 1927 served the Zoar Mennonite Church in Goltry, Oklahoma as its resident minister. He died in 1931 in Newton, Kansas.

== Works ==
The Field Columbian Museum, Chicago, published Voth' s papers in its Anthropological Series, Vols. 3, 6 and 11:

- The Oraibi Powamu Ceremony, 3(2), 64- 158, 1901
- The Oraibi Summer Snake Ceremony, 3(4), 263- 358, 1903
- The Oraibi Oaqöl Ceremony, 6(1), 1- 46, 1903
- The Traditions of the Hopi, 1905
- Oraibi Natal Customs and Ceremonies, 6(2), 47- 61
- The Oraibi Marau Ceremony, 11(1), 1- 81, 1912
- Brief Miscellaneous Hopi Papers, 11(2), 89- 149, 1912

In the same series, together with George A. Dorsey:

- The Oraibi Soyal Ceremony, 3(1), 1901
- The Mishongnovi Ceremonies of the Snake and Antelope Fraternities, 3(3), 1901
