= Iva Casuse Honwynum =

Hopi American craftswoman and social activist (born 1964)

- Iva Casuse Honwynum's Whirlwind (Bringer of Rain) pootsaya basket shown at the Heard Museum Guild Indian Fair and Market, 2017
- Born: Iva Lee Casuse; 1964 (age 61–62); Gallup, New Mexico
- Movement: Hopi basketry
- Awards: Artist-in-Residence Eiteljorg Museum of American Indians and Western Art; Many awards at Heard, Santa Fe, and Prescott Indian Markets' juried shows

Iva Casuse Honwynum (also Iva Honyestewa and Iva Lee Honyestewa; born 1964) is a Hopi/Navajo artist, social activist, and cultural practitioner. A Native American, Honwynum is best known for her woven baskets and figurative sculpture. Honwynum's most important breakthrough was the development of the pootsaya basket, called "a rare innovation in Hopi basketry". She developed the pootsaya during her 2014 residency at the School for Advanced Research in Santa Fe, New Mexico, having been awarded the Eric and Barbara Dookin Artist Fellowship.

== Background ==
Iva Casuse Honwynum was born in Gallup, New Mexico, to parents Richard Casuse (Navajo) and Shirley Casuse (née Mansfield; Sun Clan, Hopi). Honwynum is Sun (Taawa) Clan from the village of Songoopavi, Second Mesa, Arizona. Her Hopi name, Honwynum, translates in English to Female Bear Walking.

Honwynum began in 1992 as a silversmith and jewelry maker and received advanced training from her father Richard Casuse (Navajo), Leonard James Hawk (Yakama), Roy Talahaftewa (Hopi), and Charles Supplee (Hopi). She has worked with many techniques including Hopi overlay, lapidary, lost-wax casting, and tufa casting. She is included in the definitive guide to Native American jewelry makers by Gregory Schaaf of the Center for Indigenous Arts & Cultures.

Honwynum is expert at customary Hopi basket making, both the coiled basket (poota) and the sifter basket (tutsaya). Her grandmother Esther Honanie taught Honwynum to make her first coiled basket when she was ten years old. Honwynum did not revisit basket weaving until 1996, when she began lessons with her first cousin, Beth Dawahongnewa. Over the next ten years, Honwynum perfected her craft by making baskets for ceremonial purposes and began to introduce what would become her signature innovations. Her confidence grew, finally blossoming in 2006 as she began to enter art exhibitions and contests.

== Hopi basketry ==
Honwynum makes customary Hopi baskets using culturally significant materials such as yucca, willow, and three-leaf sumac. Use of these local materials created a color palette of white, green, yellow, black, and red; however, she expands her palette with commercial dyes. She uses geometric, pictographic, and figurative designs, including the incorporation of three-dimensional elements such as a domed tortoise shell central to the basket design, serving pieces such as a ladle, sandals, and pedestals.

Honwynum also has juxtaposed the ancient basket-making techniques with pop culture subject matter. For example, she created a Denver Broncos (her favorite football team) sifter basket. She also creates ambitious narrative works such as the project Where the Sun Fits In, an exploration of the migration story incorporating six Hopi clans (lizard, water, tobacco, badger, fire, and sun) and their symbols.

=== Pootsaya basket ===
Honwynum developed a combination of the sifter and the coiled basket, which she calls the pootsaya, during her 2014 residency at the School for Advanced Research in Santa Fe, New Mexico. She had considered this a project for years. Artistic imagery contains great meaning for Hopi people, so Honwynum did not take this project lightly. To build on historical designs and create something new, she needed a transcendent purpose. For Honwynum weaving is a spiritual and community activity and the pootsaya is a reflection of her deep affection for her community and culture:

Our communities, our lives have become so corrupted with alcohol, substance abuse, domestic violence, sexual assault, and even the politics. When creating this basket the purpose was woven into this unique basket. The coil portion is woven tight [... as] a tight foundation for the community. The yucca strands as they are tied onto the coil represent bringing our people back together so we can become one again and make a better community for our future children. Not only for the Hopi community but for all communities throughout the world. That is the purpose behind the pootsaya.

Honwynum explored the use of historical Hopi symbolism and subject matter, for example, a spider and its web, or a whirlwind, by placing a specific image in the plaque-like center coil of the pootsaya surrounded by a sifter section that reflects and enhances the central subject.

Of Honwynum's innovation, Andrew Higgins, registrar of the Arizona State Museum, wrote: "[Honwynum] create[d] a truly unique piece of artwork. The whole process of gathering, preparing and weaving is very long tedious process. I have such tremendous respect for artists that go that extra mile to create something so remarkable." Diane Dittemore, Curator of the Arizona State Museum considered the pootsaya "a rare innovation in Hopi basketry".

== Shows, collections, and awards ==
Honwynum exhibits at many venues, including three major juried, competitive Native American art markets: the Prescott Indian Art Market, the Heard Museum Guild Indian Fair & Market, and the Santa Fe Indian Market.

Honwynum has also won many awards, including 1st Place for Contemporary Basketry (for a pootsaya) and 2nd Place for Plaited Wicker Basketry at the 2018 Santa Fe Indian Market, the Wilma Kaemlein Memorial Acquisition Award at the Southwest Indian Art Fair in 2015; Best of Division, First, and Second Place awards at the Eiteljorg Museum of American Indians and Western Art exhibition in 2015 and 2016; Best of Category Sifter Baskets, First Place, and Second Place awards Gallup Indian Intertribal Celebration in Gallup, New Mexico in August 2011; 1st, 2nd and Honorable Mention at the Hopi Tuhisma Show in Kykotsmovi, AZ 2011–2014; 1st Place Butterfly Basket and 1st Place Geometric Design Division, Gallup Indian Intertribal Celebration in Gallup, New Mexico, in 2007; Honorable Mention in Basketry at the 2007 Museum of Northern Arizona Hopi Festival of Arts and Culture.

Honwynum's pootsaya baskets are in the permanent collection of the Arizona State Museum in Tucson and the School for Advanced Research Museum (Indian Art Research Center) in Santa Fe.

Honwynum was awarded the 2013 Artist-in-Residence award and fellowship at the Eiteljorg Museum of American Indians and Western Art in Indianapolis, Indiana. She subsequently was awarded the 2014 Eric and Barbara Dookin Artist Residency Fellowship at the School for Advanced Research in Santa Fe.

Honwynum is a subject of Sally Grotta's American Hands Project celebrating craftspeople through narrative portraiture and is on the cover of American Hands Journal volume 1. Honwynum also frequently lectures on Hopi arts and weaving and provides demonstrations.

In 2021, Honwynum was featured by the Arizona Office of Tourism, including a short documentary video, and the U.S. Parks Service, featuring a 30-minute interview discussing her artistic development and the Hopi culture.

At the 2022 Heard Museum Guild Indian Fair and Market, Honwynum won an Innovation Award and Judge's Award for her Whirlwind Waterweave and Flowers Life Sooyosi pootsaya baskets, respectively.

== Social activism and community building ==
Honwynum is a social activist, community builder, and preserver of Hopi culture. She has worked with community-building programs which include youth services and education, substance abuse prevention, and nutrition and health. Culturally, she is focused on providing support for the arts, Hopi language, and customary Hopi food. She is revising a Hopi cookbook for the Hopi Putavi Project in partnership with the Hopi Community Health Representative Office, the Hopi Special Diabetes Program, and the University of Arizona Cooperative Extension Hopi Office. She co-authored "Understanding Access to and Use of Traditional Foods by Hopi Women," a peer-reviewed article in the Journal of Hunger and Environmental Nutrition.

Honwynum owns and operates Iskasokpu Gallery on Second Mesa, Arizona, which promotes Hopi artists. Iskasokpu translates to "the spring where the coyote burped." She also holds demonstrations and teaches Hopi cooking recipes (and has done so across many venues, including at the university level) and provides catering and private dinners.

The artist also has worked for the United States Department of Agriculture.

== Personal life ==
Honwynum has four sons. Honwynum attended Yavapai Community College and Northland Pioneer College. She is closely related to the very accomplished basket maker, Adeline Lomayestewa. Both women taught Reba Ann Lomayestewa basketry techniques.
