= Sipaulovi, Arizona =

- Populated place
- Location within the state of Arizona Sipaulovi (the United States)
- Coordinates: 35°48′30″N 110°29′46″W
- Country: United States
- State: Arizona
- County: Navajo
- Elevation: 6,313 ft (1,924 m)
- Time zone: UTC-7 (Mountain (MST))
  - Summer (DST): UTC-7 (MST)
- Area code: 928
- FIPS code: 04-67230
- GNIS feature ID: 11227

Sipaulovi is a populated place situated on the Hopi Reservation within the Second Mesa CDP in Navajo County, Arizona, United States. It has been known by numerous names over the years, including Ah-le-la, Ahela, Ci-pau-lo-vi, Sha-pah-la, Sha-pah-lah-lwee, Shi-pau-i-luvi, Shi-paui-i-luvi, Shipaulavi, Shipaulovi, Shipolia, and Shipowlawe. Historically, it has had two official names, both as a result of decisions by the Board on Geographic Names. In 1915, the Board officially named the settlement Shipolovi, but in 1988 they changed the official name to its current Sipaulovi. It was settled in approximately 1750 by settlers who were fleeing from a mosquito infestation. In Hopi sipaulovi refers to mosquitos.
