= Second Mesa, Arizona =

CDP in Navajo County, Arizona

- CDP
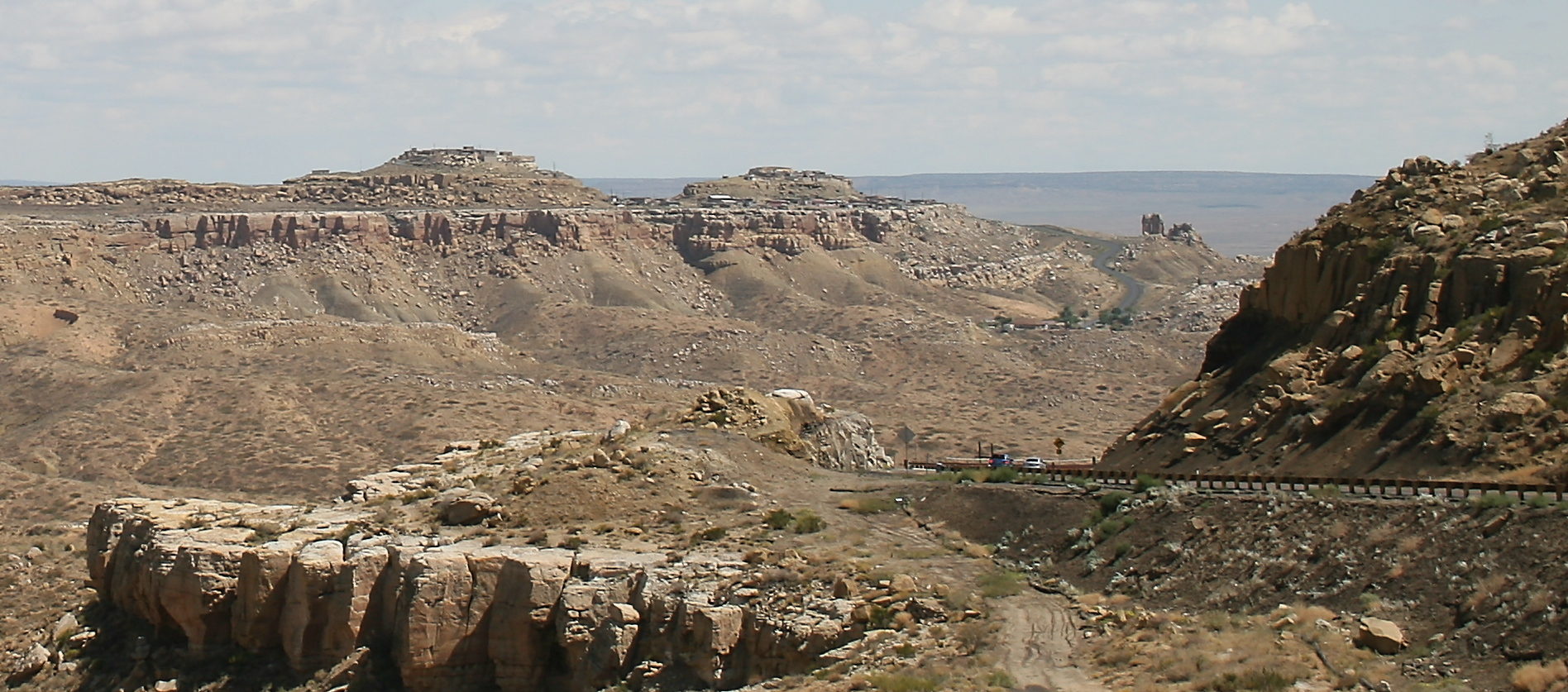
- Mishongnovi as seen from Arizona State Route 264 at the ascent to Shungopavi

- Location in Navajo County and the state of Arizona

- Location in the United States
- Coordinates: 35°49′23″N 110°30′15″W
- Country: United States
- State: Arizona
- County: Navajo

Area
  - Total: 40.14 sq mi (103.96 km^{2})
  - Land: 40.12 sq mi (103.92 km^{2})
  - Water: 0.015 sq mi (0.04 km^{2})
- Elevation: 5,962 ft (1,817 m)

Population (2020)
  - Total: 843
  - Density: 21.0/sq mi (8.11/km^{2})
- Time zone: UTC-7 (MST)
- ZIP code: 86043
- Area code: 928
- FIPS code: 04-65280
- GNIS feature ID: 2409299

Second Mesa is a census-designated place (CDP) in Navajo County, Arizona, on the Hopi Reservation, atop the 5,700-foot (1,740 m) mesa. As of the 2020 census, the CDP population was 843, spread among three Hopi Indian villages, Musungnuvi (or Mishongnovi), Supawlavi (or Sipaulovi), and Songoopavi (or Shungopavi). The Hopi Cultural Center is on Second Mesa.

== Geography ==
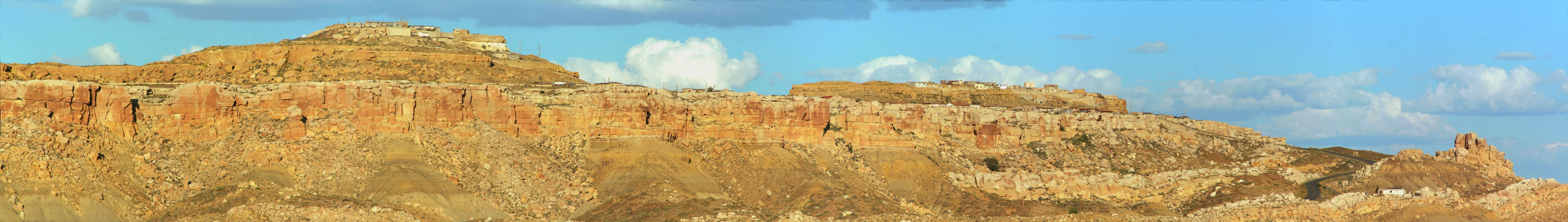
Second Mesa

According to the United States Census Bureau, the CDP has a total area of 26.5 square miles (69 km^{2}).

== Demographics ==
Historical population
Census	Pop.	Note	%±
2000	814		—
2010	962		18.2%
2020	843		−12.4%
U.S. Decennial Census

Second Mesa CDP, Arizona – Racial composition Note: the US Census treats Hispanic/Latino as an ethnic category. This table excludes Latinos from the racial categories and assigns them to a separate category. Hispanics/Latinos may be of any race.
Race (NH = Non-Hispanic)	% 2020	% 2010	% 2000	Pop 2020	Pop 2010	Pop 2000
White alone (NH)	0.7%	1.5%	1.2%	6	14	10
Black alone (NH)	0.1%	0.2%	0%	1	2	0
American Indian alone (NH)	98.3%	94%	96.9%	829	904	789
Asian alone (NH)	0.2%	1%	0.1%	2	10	1
Pacific Islander alone (NH)	0%	0%	0%	0	0	0
Other race alone (NH)	0%	0%	0%	0	0	0
Multiracial (NH)	0.4%	0.8%	1.4%	3	8	11
Hispanic/Latino (any race)	0.2%	2.5%	0.4%	2	24	3

The ancestries reported in 2020 were Hopi (92.4%) and Navajo (2.8%).

Languages (2000)	Percent
Spoke Hopi at home	74%
Spoke English at home	26%

At the 2000 census there were 814 people, 209 households, and 169 families in the CDP. The population density was 30.8 inhabitants per square mile (11.9/km^{2}). There were 255 housing units at an average density of 9.6/sq mi (3.7/km^{2}). The racial makeup of the CDP was 97% Native American, 1% White, <1% Asian, <1% from other races, and 2% from two or more races. <1% of the population were Hispanic or Latino of any race. Of the 209 households 46% had children under the age of 18 living with them, 45% were married couples living together, 34% had a female householder with no husband present, and 19% were non-families. 17% of households were one person and 8.1% were one person aged 65 or older. The average household size was 3.9 and the average family size was 4.4.

The age distribution was 40% under the age of 18, 10% from 18 to 24, 25% from 25 to 44, 17% from 45 to 64, and 8% 65 or older. The median age was 25 years. For every 100 females, there were 95 males. For every 100 females age 18 and over, there were 91 males.

The median household income was $22,981 and the median family income was $23,947. Males had a median income of $22,679 versus $21,898 for females. The per capita income for the CDP was $6,089. About 33% of families and 36% of the population were below the poverty line, including 37% of those under age 18 and 23.8% of those age 65 or over.

== Education ==
Second Mesa is a part of the Cedar Unified School District. Hopi High School serves Second Mesa.

The Hopi Lavayi Nest Model Program, a pilot Hopi language revitalization project for families with children birth through age five was launched in the village of Sipaulovi."
