= KUYI =

Public radio station in Keams Canyon, Arizona

- Keams Canyon, Arizona; United States
- Broadcast area: Hopi Tribe
- Frequency: 88.1 (MHz)
- Branding: Hopi Radio

Programming
- Format: Native American/Public Radio
- Affiliations: Native Public Media; Native Voice One; National Public Radio

Ownership
- Owner: The Hopi Foundation; (The Hopi Foundation)

History
- First air date: December 20, 2000
- Call sign meaning: KUYI = "Water" in the Hopi Language

Technical information
- Licensing authority: FCC
- Class: C1
- ERP: 69,000 Watts
- HAAT: 124 meters (601 feet)
- Transmitter coordinates: 35°48′29″N 110°16′23″W

Links
- Public license information: Public file; LMS
- Webcast: Listen Live
- Website: KUYI Hopi Radio

KUYI 88.1 FM, is a Native American Public Radio station in Keams Canyon, Arizona. The station, founded in 2000, primarily features locally produced programming for the Hopi, Tewa, and Navajo Native American tribal residents, surrounding communities in Northern Arizona, the Four Corners areas and streaming worldwide. Other network programming is provided by Native Voice One. Top of the hour news updates from National Public Radio are aired Monday through Friday. Its musical programming is a mix of traditional Hopi and modern music.

As of August 2012, KUYI was broadcasting to an audience estimated at 9,000 people. Its programs include a junior and senior high school class that broadcasts in Hopi, a morning Sunday show aimed at small children, and cultural discussions for adults that are held according to the lunar calendar, in keeping with Hopi tradition.

The station's name, Kuyi, is also the Hopi word for "water." A language revitalization project, The Shooting Stars Hopi Lavayi Radio Project, has been developed with the Polacca Head Start Center, broadcasting in the First Mesa Dialect for students. The station's mascot is the koyala, a clown figure from Hopi culture.

As of 2009, all programs were produced by Hopi tribal members. Other local programming has included a weekly teen program by students of Hopi High School, and a health program in partnership with the Hopi Health Care Center. In 2007, the station began presenting Annual "Listeners' Choice" awards. The categories for 2010 were: Best Traditional Artist, Best Female Artist, Best Male Artist, and Best Contemporary Artist; the awards celebration was held at the Hopi Cultural Center.

The station played an important role in emergency response in 2010, due to its "69,000 watt signal [that] echoes across the canyons and bounces off the mesas that make up the 1.5 million acre reservation." In January 2010, the Hopi reservation was without power for two days as the result of a winter storm. KUYI stayed on the air, even when larger radio stations in Flagstaff, Arizona were not operational, and provided emergency information to four counties.

Floods in July 2010 left the First Mesa Consolidated Villages without potable water or sewage. KUYI was able to keep its listeners informed for the three days it took for water trucks to arrive.
