= Shongopovi, Arizona =

CDP in Navajo County, Arizona

- CDP
- Location in Navajo County and the state of Arizona

- Location in the United States
- Coordinates: 35°49′11″N 110°31′59″W
- Country: United States
- State: Arizona
- County: Navajo

Area
  - Total: 1.59 sq mi (4.13 km^{2})
  - Land: 1.59 sq mi (4.11 km^{2})
  - Water: 0.0077 sq mi (0.02 km^{2})
- Elevation: 6,342 ft (1,933 m)

Population (2020)
  - Total: 711
  - Density: 448.1/sq mi (173.02/km^{2})
- Time zone: UTC-7 (MST)
- ZIP code: 86043
- Area code: 928
- FIPS code: 04-66190
- GNIS feature ID: 2408730

Shongopovi (Hopi: Songòopavi) is a census-designated place (CDP) in Navajo County, Arizona, United States. It is located on the Second Mesa, within the Hopi Reservation.

The population was 632 at the 2000 census.

== Geography ==
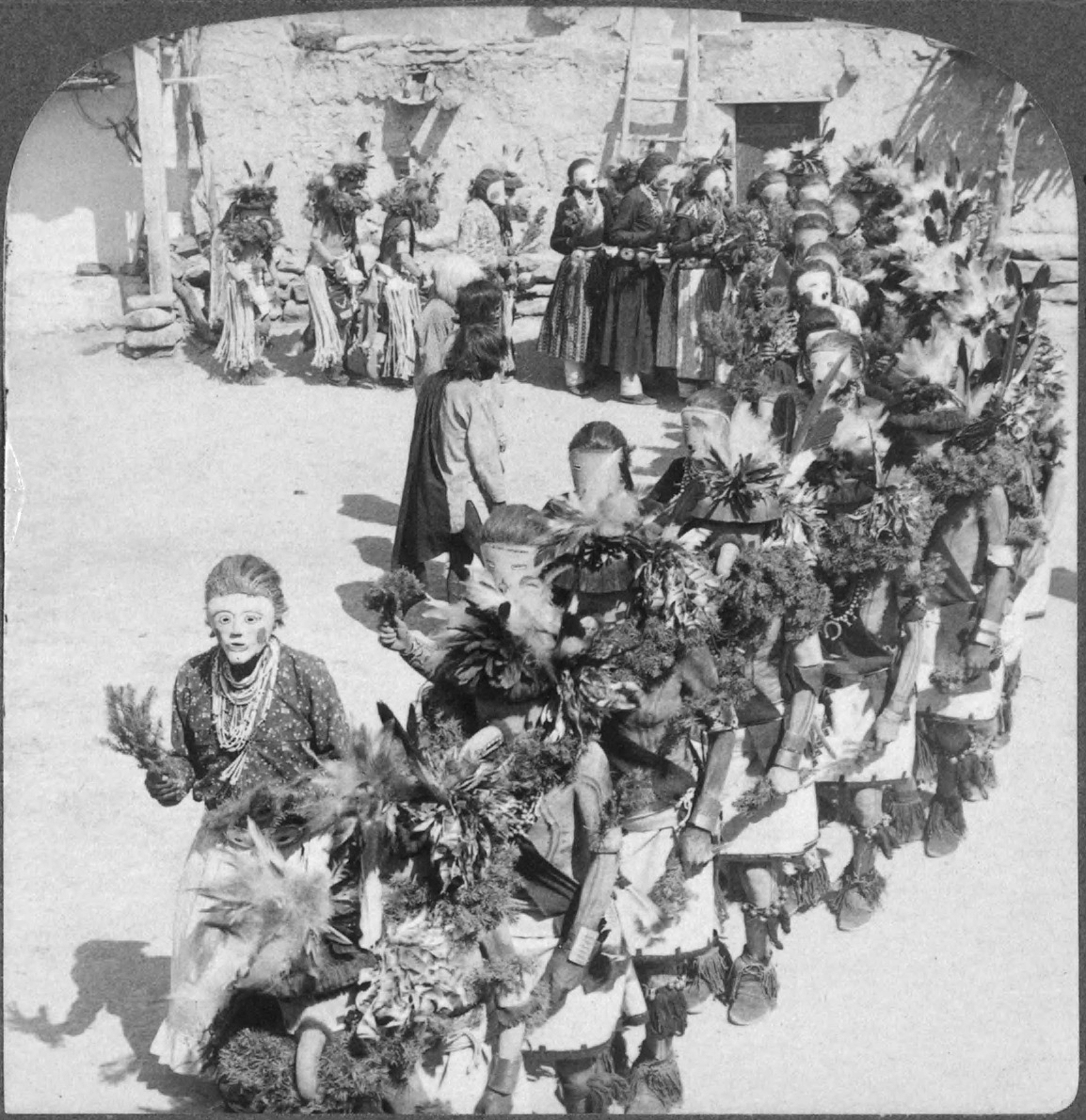
Kachina dancers, Shongopovi pueblo, Arizona, sometime before 1900

According to the United States Census Bureau, the CDP has a total area of 1.7 square miles (4.4 km^{2}), all land.

== Demographics ==
Historical population
Census	Pop.	Note	%±
1990	730		—
2000	632		−13.4%
2020	711		—

Languages (2000)	Percent
Spoke Hopi at home	84.1%
Spoke English at home	15.9%

As of the census of 2000, there were 632 people, 163 households, and 134 families residing in the CDP. The population density was 374.2 inhabitants per square mile (144.5/km^{2}). There were 190 housing units at an average density of 112.5 per square mile (43.4/km^{2}). The racial makeup of the CDP was 1.4% White, 98.1% Native American, and 0.5% from two or more races. 0.5% of the population were Hispanic or Latino of any race.

There were 163 households, out of which 41.7% had children under the age of 18 living with them, 35.0% were married couples living together, 41.1% had a female householder with no husband present, and 17.2% were non-families. 16.6% of all households were made up of individuals, and 6.1% had someone living alone who was 65 years of age or older. The average household size was 3.88 and the average family size was 4.27.

In the CDP, the population was spread out, with 38.4% under the age of 18, 8.2% from 18 to 24, 25.8% from 25 to 44, 17.6% from 45 to 64, and 10.0% who were 65 years of age or older. The median age was 28 years. For every 100 females, there were 89.8 males. For every 100 females age 18 and over, there were 80.1 males.

The median income for a household in the CDP was $13,000, and the median income for a family was $12,159. Males had a median income of $29,306 versus $24,643 for females. The per capita income for the CDP was $5,813. About 51.1% of families and 55.2% of the population were below the poverty line, including 70.0% of those under age 18 and 43.2% of those age 65 or over.

== Education ==
Shongopovi is a part of the Cedar Unified School District. Hopi Jr./High School is the school that most children of Shongopovi attend. White Cone High School serves Shongopovi.

== Notable people ==
- Iva Honyestewa, basket maker, jeweler, Hopi foods advocate
- Fred Kabotie (1900–1986), artist and writer
- Otis Polelonema (1902–1981), painter, weaver, poet and writer
- Lewis Tewanima, (Tsokahovi Tewanima), athlete
