= Hotevilla-Bacavi, Arizona =

CDP in Navajo County, Arizona

- CDP
- Location in Navajo County and the state of Arizona

- Location in Arizona#Location in the United States Hotevilla-Bacavi (the United States)
- Coordinates: 35°54′50″N 110°38′26″W
- Country: United States
- State: Arizona
- County: Navajo

Area
  - Total: 11.76 sq mi (30.45 km^{2})
  - Land: 11.75 sq mi (30.44 km^{2})
  - Water: 0.0039 sq mi (0.01 km^{2})
- Elevation: 6,270 ft (1,910 m)

Population (2020)
  - Total: 1,001
  - Density: 85.2/sq mi (32.89/km^{2})
- Time zone: UTC-7 (MST)
- ZIP code: 86030
- Area code: 928
- FIPS code: 04-33945
- GNIS feature ID: 2408402

Hotevilla-Bacavi (Hopi: Hotvela-Paaqavi; also known as Third Mesa) is a census-designated place (CDP) in Navajo County, Arizona, United States, on the Hopi Reservation. The population was 957 at the 2010 census.

== History ==
Hotevilla was first settled by the "hostiles", a group of Hopi residents who were forced out of nearby Oraibi in the 1906 Oraibi Split due to ideological differences over European cultural influences by recently arrived settlers, soldiers and missionaries, influences against which the hostiles were opposed. The US Army seized the children of Hotevilla on Dec 2, 1911 and sent them to government boarding schools after years of protracted resistance. Later attempts to reintegrate displaced residents resulted in another split to the settlement of Bacavi, which later joined with Hotevilla to create a unified settlement. Hotevilla is mentioned by D. H. Lawrence in his Mornings in Mexico travel memoir. The English author visited Hotevilla and Hopi country in 1924.

== Geography ==
According to the United States Census Bureau, the CDP has a total area of 11.9 square miles (31 km^{2}), all land.

== Demographics ==
Historical population
Census	Pop.	Note	%±
2000	767		—
2010	957		24.8%
2020	1,001		4.6%
U.S. Decennial Census

=== 2020 census ===
As of the 2020 census, Hotevilla-Bacavi had a population of 1,001. The median age was 39.8 years. 24.5% of residents were under the age of 18 and 17.9% of residents were 65 years of age or older. For every 100 females there were 88.5 males, and for every 100 females age 18 and over there were 79.6 males age 18 and over.

0.0% of residents lived in urban areas, while 100.0% lived in rural areas.

There were 291 households in Hotevilla-Bacavi, of which 36.8% had children under the age of 18 living in them. Of all households, 35.7% were married-couple households, 26.8% were households with a male householder and no spouse or partner present, and 34.4% were households with a female householder and no spouse or partner present. About 29.2% of all households were made up of individuals and 11.7% had someone living alone who was 65 years of age or older.

There were 371 housing units, of which 21.6% were vacant. The homeowner vacancy rate was 0.0% and the rental vacancy rate was 4.7%.

Racial composition as of the 2020 census
Race	Number	Percent
White	11	1.1%
Black or African American	0	0.0%
American Indian and Alaska Native	978	97.7%
Asian	2	0.2%
Native Hawaiian and Other Pacific Islander	0	0.0%
Some other race	0	0.0%
Two or more races	10	1.0%
Hispanic or Latino (of any race)	5	0.5%

=== 2000 census ===
Languages (2000)	Percent
Spoke Hopi at home	79.4%
Spoke English at home	20.6%

At the 2000 census there were 767 people, 246 households, and 181 families in the CDP. The population density was 64.4 inhabitants per square mile (24.9/km^{2}). There were 331 housing units at an average density of 27.8 per square mile (10.7/km^{2}). The racial makeup of the CDP was 96.0% Native American, 3.8% White, and 0.2% from two or more races. 1.0% of the population were Hispanic or Latino of any race. Of the 246 households 34.6% had children under the age of 18 living with them, 41.1% were married couples living together, 28.9% had a female householder with no husband present, and 26.4% were non-families. 24.4% of households were one person and 8.9% were one person aged 65 or older. The average household size was 3.12 and the average family size was 3.72.

The age distribution was 31.0% under the age of 18, 9.0% from 18 to 24, 24.8% from 25 to 44, 22.7% from 45 to 64, and 12.5% 65 or older. The median age was 35 years. For every 100 females, there were 90.8 males. For every 100 females age 18 and over, there were 83.0 males.

The median household income was $13,750 and the median family income was $18,500. Males had a median income of $12,174 versus $19,095 for females. The per capita income for the CDP was $5,975. About 58.9% of families and 69.4% of the population were below the poverty line, including 78.2% of those under age 18 and 41.4% of those age 65 or over.

== Education ==
Hotevilla-Bacavi is a part of the Cedar Unified School District. White Cone High School serves Hotevilla-Bacavi.

== Notable people ==
- Charles Loloma (1921–1991), Hopi jeweler
- Helen Sekaquaptewa (1898–1990), Hopi storyteller
