= Don C. Talayesva =

Don Chuka Talayesva (1890–1985) was a Hopi who is noted for his autobiography, written in conjunction with Yale University anthropologist Leo Simmons, describing his life until 1940. Talayesva was born with the name Chuka in Old Oraibi, Arizona, and grew up until the age of ten in a traditional Hopi manner, but then spent ten years largely in European culture before making a full return to the Hopi way. It has been suggested that Simmons method of interviewing may have led Talayesva to reveal more than he entirely felt comfortable doing and this aspect has been an element of discussion concerning him. In the field of anthropology he was referred to as "the most documented man".

== Bibliography ==
- Don C. Talayeva, Sun Chief: The Autobiography of a Hopi Indian, The Lamar Series in Western History (Book 8), Yale University Press, September 10, 1963. ISBN 978-0300002270
