= Kykotsmovi Village, Arizona =

CDP in Navajo County, Arizona

- CDP
- Location in Navajo County and the state of Arizona

- Location in the United States
- Coordinates: 35°52′15″N 110°37′16″W
- Country: United States
- State: Arizona
- County: Navajo

Area
  - Total: 16.93 sq mi (43.86 km^{2})
  - Land: 16.92 sq mi (43.82 km^{2})
  - Water: 0.012 sq mi (0.03 km^{2})
- Elevation: 5,614 ft (1,711 m)

Population (2020)
  - Total: 736
  - Density: 43.5/sq mi (16.79/km^{2})
- Time zone: UTC-7 (MST)
- ZIP code: 86039
- Area code: 928
- FIPS code: 04-39100
- GNIS feature ID: 2408499

Kykotsmovi Village, also known as K-Town or New Oraibi (o-RYE-bee) is a census-designated place (CDP) in Navajo County, Arizona, United States. It is the seat of tribal government of the Hopi Reservation, a sovereign nation located in northeastern Arizona. The Hopi word is spelled Kiqötsmovi (Hopi pronunciation: [?], kee-KEUTS-mo-vee) and means "mound of ruined houses". The population was 776 at the 2000 census. The Hopi reservation occupies part of Coconino and Navajo counties, encompasses more than 1.5 million acres, and is made up of 12 villages on three mesas. Kykotsmovi is one of the 12 villages located in third mesa. Third Mesa includes Hotvela (Hotevilla), Paaqavi (Bacavi), Munqapi (Moencopi), Kiqotsmovi (Kykotsmovi), and Orayvi (Oraibi).

== History ==
The village was founded after an internal Hopi dispute in Oraibi in 1906 concerning how to interact with missionaries and federal agents and programs. Kykotsmovi is sometimes referred to as Oraibi or New Oraibi.National Historic Landmarks Program (NHL)Hopi Country

== Geography ==
According to the United States Census Bureau, the CDP has a total area of 16.8 square miles (44 km^{2}), all land.

== Demographics ==
Historical population
Census	Pop.	Note	%±
2020	736		—
U.S. Decennial Census

Languages (2000)	Percent
Spoke Hopi at home	56%
Spoke English at home	40%
Spoke Navajo at home	4%

As of the census of 2000, there were 776 people, 253 households, and 184 families residing in the CDP. The population density was 46.1 inhabitants per square mile (17.8/km^{2}). There were 302 housing units at an average density of 17.9 per square mile (6.9/km^{2}). The racial makeup of the CDP was 93.4% Native American, 3.9% White, 0.9% Black or African American, 0.3% Asian, 0.3% from other races, and 1.3% from two or more races. Hispanic or Latino of any race were 1.4% of the population.

There were 253 households, out of which 32.8% had children under the age of 18 living with them, 41.9% were married couples living together, 23.7% had a female householder with no husband present, and 26.9% were non-families. 25.3% of all households were made up of individuals, and 10.3% had someone living alone who was 65 years of age or older. The average household size was 3.07 and the average family size was 3.69.

In the CDP, the population was spread out, with 32.9% under the age of 18, 9.3% from 18 to 24, 24.6% from 25 to 44, 22.2% from 45 to 64, and 11.1% who were 65 years of age or older. The median age was 32 years. For every 100 females, there were 96.5 males. For every 100 females age 18 and over, there were 94.4 males.

The median income for a household in the CDP was $23,750, and the median income for a family was $30,729. Males had a median income of $21,964 versus $20,972 for females. The per capita income for the CDP was $9,067. About 24.0% of families and 24.8% of the population were below the poverty line, including 22.7% of those under age 18 and 30.4% of those age 65 or over.

== Additional Information ==
The village has one store, a post office, a community building, and one school (Hopi Day School). The road through the village is Route 264.

Hopi from Old Oraibi founded this settlement near a spring at the base of Third Mesa. Kykotsmovi has offices of the Hopi Tribal Council.

On October 9, 1986, the Phoenix Suns defeated the Dallas Mavericks 105–97 before a standing-room-only crowd of 3,300 in an NBA exhibition game in Kykotsmovi.
