= Hopi Reservation =

Coordinates: 35°54′42″N 110°36′56″W

Hopi Reservation Hopitutskwa (Hopi)
- Indian reservation
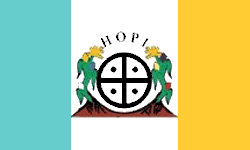
- Flag
- Interactive map of Hopi Reservation
- Tribe: Hopi
- Country: United States
- State: Arizona
- Counties: Coconino; Navajo
- Established: December 16, 1882
- Constitution: December 19, 1936
- Capital: Kykotsmovi (de facto)
- Subdivisions: 10 Villages: First Mesa; Mishongnovi; Sipaulovi; Shungopavi; Oraibi; Kykotsmovi; Bacavi; Hotevilla; Upper Moenkopi; Lower Moenkopi

Government
  - Body: Hopi Tribal Council
  - Chairman: Timothy Nuvangyaoma
  - Vice Chairman: Alfred Lomahquahu Jr.

Area
  - Total: 6,557.262 km^{2} (2,531.773 sq mi)

Population (2017)
  - Total: 9,268
  - Density: 1.413/km^{2} (3.661/sq mi)
- Time zone: MST: UTC−07:00 (no DST)
- Website: hopi-nsn.gov

- People: Hopi
- Language: Hopilàvayi, Hand Talk
- Country: Hopitutskwa

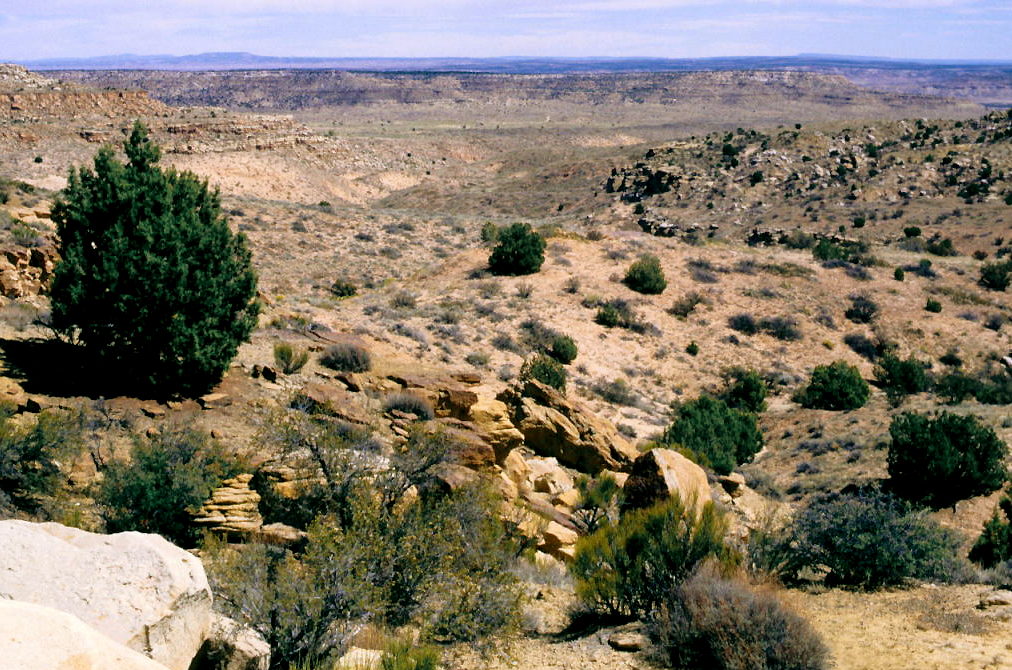
Third Mesa as seen from Arizona State Route 264 between Hotevilla-Bacavi and Oraibi

The Hopi Reservation (Hopi: Hopitutskwa) is a Native American reservation for the Hopi and Arizona Tewa people, surrounded entirely by the Navajo Nation, in Navajo and Coconino counties in northeastern Arizona, United States. The site has a land area of 2,531.773 sq mi (6,557.262 km^{2}) and, as of the 2020 census had a population of 7,791.

The two nations formerly shared the Navajo–Hopi Joint Use Area until the Navajo–Hopi Land Settlement Act created an artificial boundary through the area. The partition of this area, commonly known as Big Mountain, by acts of Congress in 1974 and 1996, has resulted in continuing controversy.

The system of villages unites three mesas in the Pueblo style traditionally used by the Hopi. Walpi is the oldest village on First Mesa, having been established in 1690 after the villages at the foot of mesa Koechaptevela were abandoned for fear of Spanish reprisal after the 1680 Pueblo Revolt. The Tewa people live on First Mesa. Hopi also occupy the Second Mesa and Third Mesa. The community of Winslow West is off-reservation trust land of the Hopi tribe.

The Hopi Tribal Council is the local governing body consisting of elected officials from the various reservation villages. Its powers were given to it under the Hopi Tribal Constitution.

The Hopi consider their life on the reservation (in particular, the traditional clan residence, the spiritual life of the kivas on the mesa, and their dependence on corn) an integral and critically sustaining part of the "fourth world". Hopi High School is the secondary education institute for reservation residents. Hopi Radio, a station with a mix of traditional Hopi and typical American programming is run for the reservation and provides internships for Hopi High School.

== Communities ==
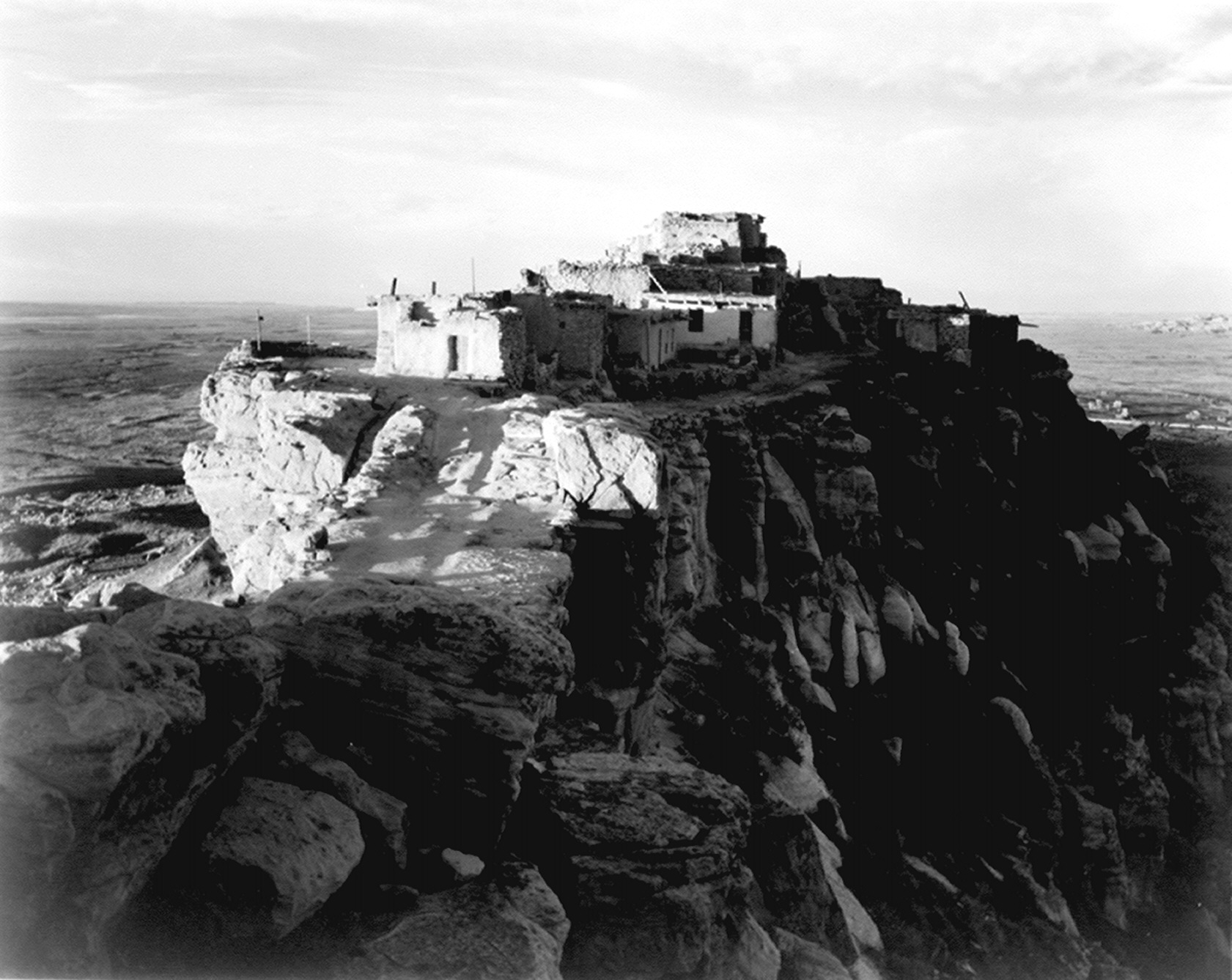
Walpi and First Mesa in 1941 (photo by Ansel Adams)

- Keams Canyon
- Lower and Upper Moenkopi
- Polacca
- Winslow West
- Yuuwelo Paaki (Spider Mound)
- New Oraibi (Kiqotsmovi, Kykotsmovi)

=== First Mesa ===
- Waalpi (Walpi)
- Hanoki (Hano or Tewa)
- Sitsomovi (Sichomovi)

=== Second Mesa ===
- Songoopavi (Shongopavi)
- Musangnuvi (Mishongnovi)
- Sipawlavi (Shipaulovi)

=== Third Mesa ===
- Hoatvela (Hotevilla)
- Paaqavi (Bacavi)
- Munqapi (Moencopi)
- Orayvi (Oraibi)

== Time zone ==
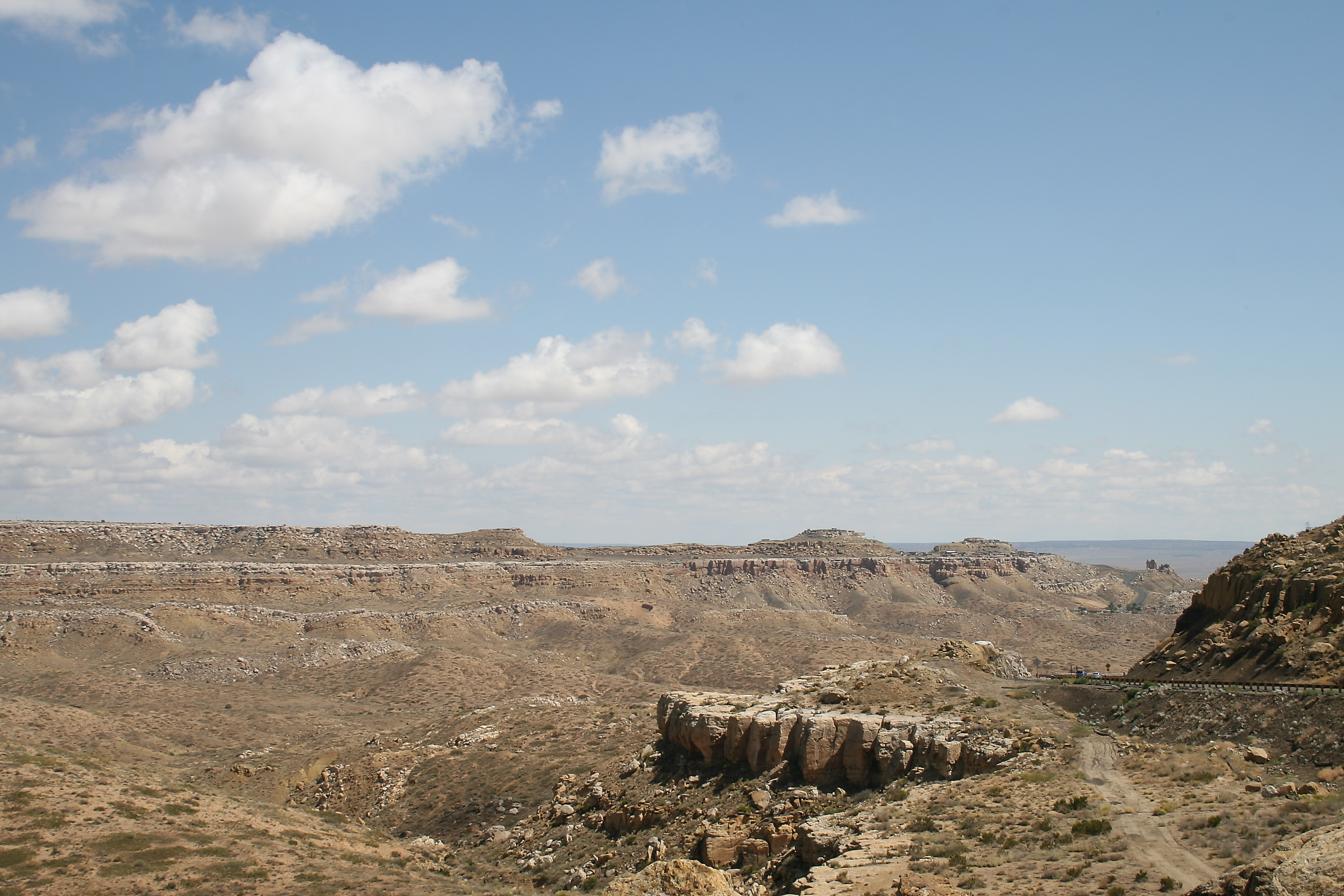
Second Mesa and Mishongnovi, Navajo County, Arizona, as seen from the Arizona State Route 264 at the ascent to Shungopavi

The Hopi Reservation lies within the Mountain Time Zone. Like most of Arizona, but unlike the surrounding Navajo Nation, it does not observe daylight saving time.

== Aerial views ==
Aerial views looking north along the central three of the reservation's five major washes, from west to east:

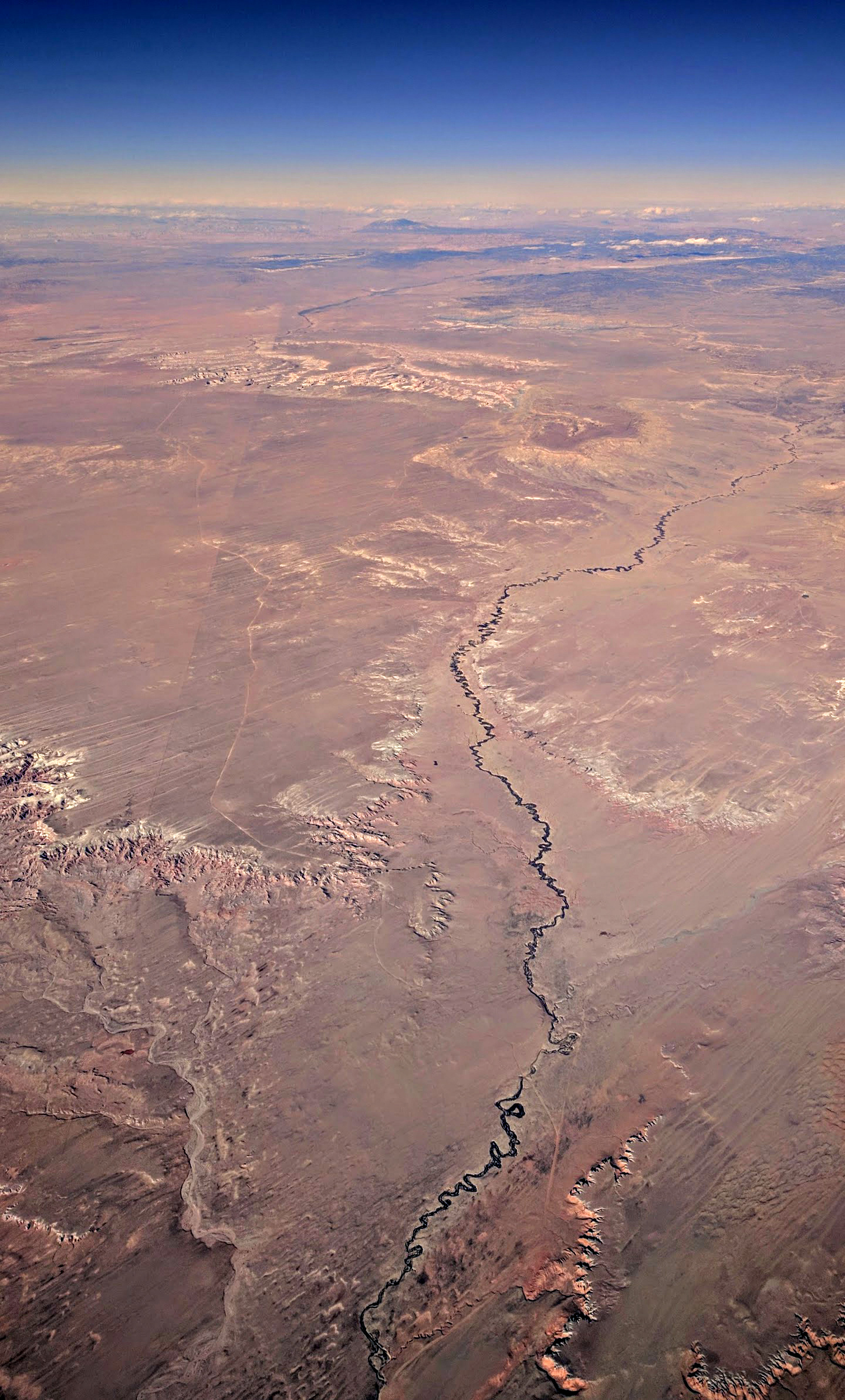
Dinnebito Wash, with Third Mesa in the distance

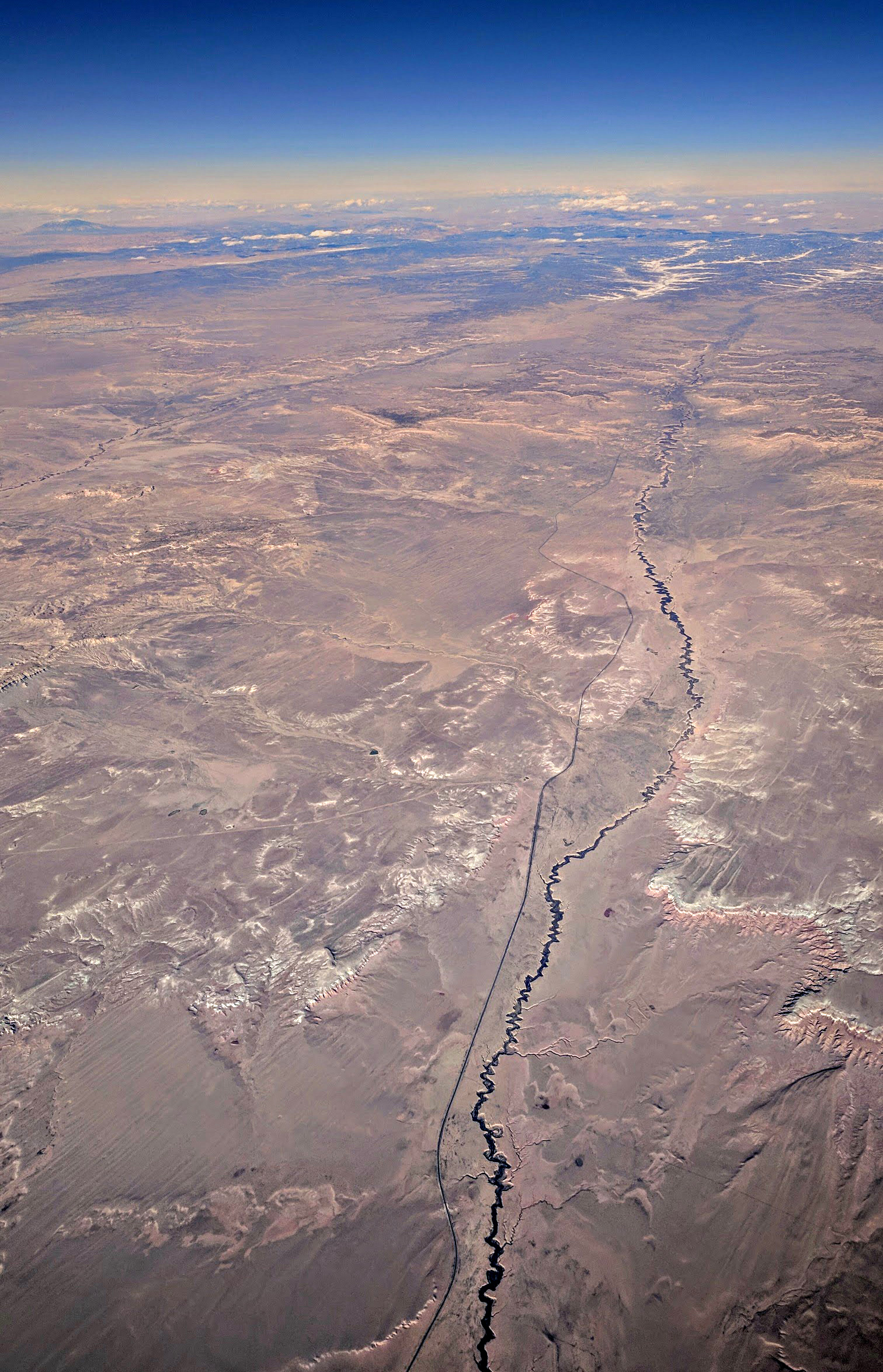
Oraibi Wash and Indian Route 2

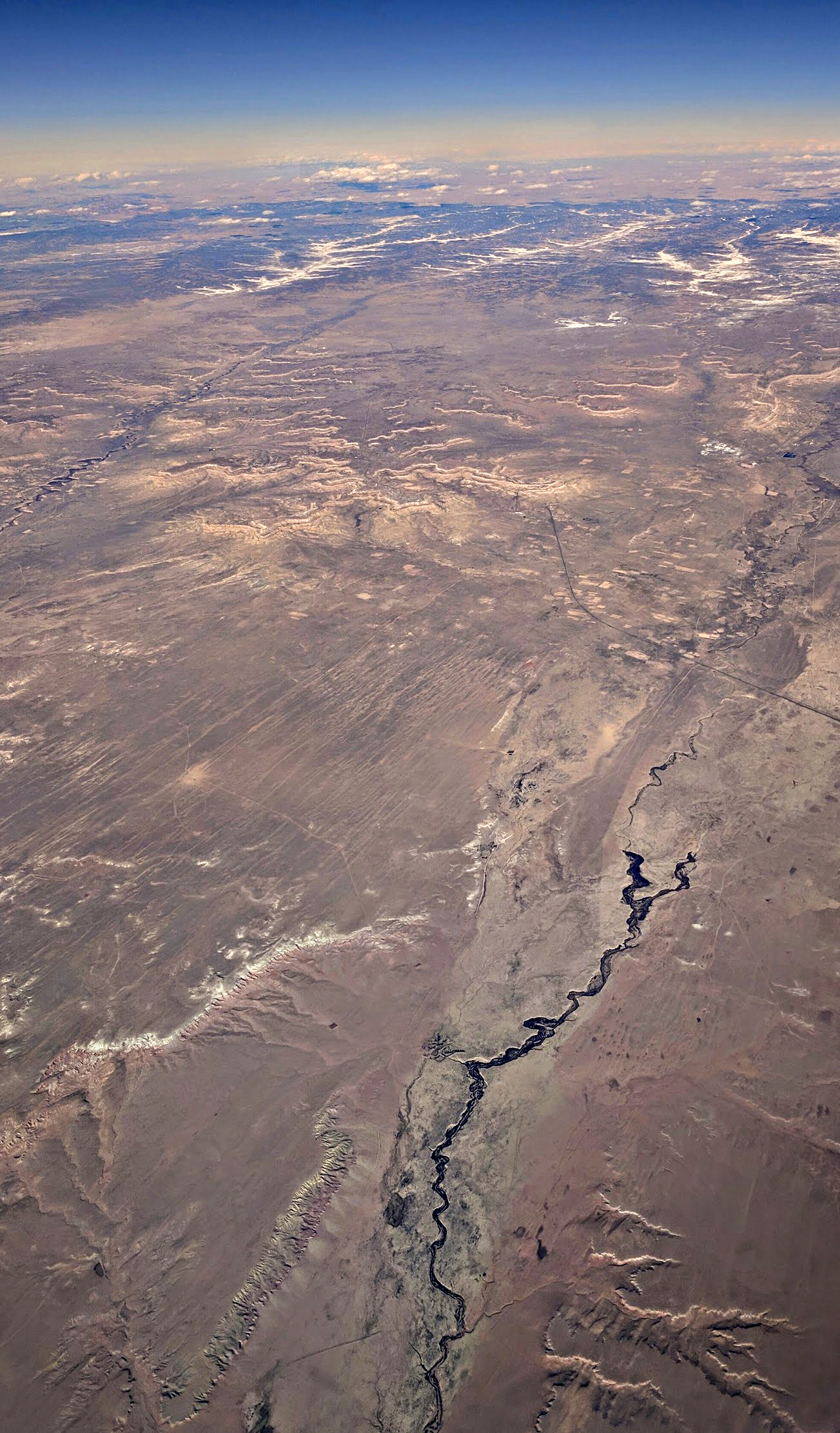
Polacca Wash, crossed by Arizona Route 87, with First Mesa and Second Mesa visible in the distance

== See also ==
- Hopi flag
