= White Cone High School =

School in Keams Canyon, Arizona

Coordinates: 35.66651°N 110.07973°W

Location
- AZ Hwy. 77, MP 31; Keams Canyon, Arizona 86034; United States

Information
- School type: Public high school
- Established: 2005
- Closed: 2012
- School district: Cedar Unified School District
- Principal: George Mattice
- Grades: 9–12
- Enrollment: 88 students (Oct. 2010)
- Colors: Royal blue and silver
- Mascot: Broncos

White Cone High School was a high school in Keams Canyon, Arizona, and the only high school in the Cedar Unified School District. which also includes the Jeddito elementary school. It was created in 2005 to offer a public district school in the area, as the closest public district high school is one hour away in Holbrook, and Hopi Junior/Senior High School, located within the Hopi reservation and not the Navajo Nation, is filled to capacity.

In May 2012, White Cone High School was closed, as the district's governing board voted 3–2 in February to shutter the school due to continuing financial difficulties; the facility also formerly housed an online school known as White Cone Academy.
