= Hopi Junior/Senior High School =

Public school in Keams Canyon, Arizona

Hopi Junior Senior High School

Location
- Keams Canyon, Arizona 86034; United States; 35°48′58″N 110°18′25″W

Information
- School type: Public high school (tribal, BIE-affiliated)
- Established: 1987 (39 years ago)
- CEEB code: 030335
- Teaching staff: 30.00 (FTE)
- Grades: 7–12
- Enrollment: 484 (2023-2024)
- Student to teacher ratio: 16.13
- Colors: Royal blue, silver and white
- Mascot: Bruins
- Website: www.hjshs.org

Hopi Junior Senior High School (HJSHS) is a tribal junior high and high school in Keams Canyon, Arizona, USA. It is operated in cooperation with the Bureau of Indian Education (BIE) as a grant day school.

== Administration ==
- Superintendent (Acting) – Alban Naha
- Dean of Students – Jerry Cronin

== Governing Board ==
- President – Valerie Kooyaquaptewa

== Academics ==
Hopi Junior Senior High School is accredited by Cognia, formerly known as the North Central Association of Colleges and Schools.

== Sports accomplishments ==
The Hopi Bruins' boys' and girls' teams are a prominent activity at the school. Running is deeply rooted in the northern Arizona tribe's tradition as a way to carry messages and bless the reservation with rain. The boys currently have a total of 27 straight state championships, which is the national record according to the National Federation of State High School Associations, while the girls currently have 22 state titles.

Boys' Cross Country (27 state champions) (national record)

- 1990, 1991, 1992, 1993, 1994, 1995,
  1996, 1997, 1998, 1999, 2000, 2001,
  2002, 2003, 2004, 2005, 2006, 2007,
  2008, 2009, 2010, 2011, 2012, 2013,
  2014, 2015, 2016

Girls' Cross Country (22 State Champions)

- 1987, 1988, 1989, 1990, 1991, 1992,
  1993, 1994, 1996, 1997, 1998, 1999,
  2000, 2002, 2003, 2007, 2008, 2009,
  2010, 2011, 2012, 2013

== History ==
The school's September 2, 1986 opening gave 550 students and the Hopi community its first reservation high school and allowed for the closure of the Phoenix Indian School. For most of its history, it has been the only high school in Keams Canyon. (Note: The public Cedar Unified School District opened White Cone High School in 2005 and closed it in 2012.) An Educational Master Plan was presented after January 1987 to the Hopi Tribal Council in order to address the needs of Hopis in their educational system. This plan was created by both the Hopi Tribe Department of Education and the then Office of Indian Education Programs.

For a time in the late 1990s and 2000s, the school was a public charter, though it changed back to a BIE school in 2005.

In November 2013, Charles Youvella, a running back and defensive back for Hopi's football team, incurred a head injury during a Division V playoff game against the team from Arizona Lutheran Academy. He lined up for two more plays, then collapsed on the field. Youvella was in critical condition by the time he reached St. Joseph's Hospital and Medical Center in Phoenix and died two days later.
