= Oraibi, Arizona =

Historic place in Navajo County, Arizona

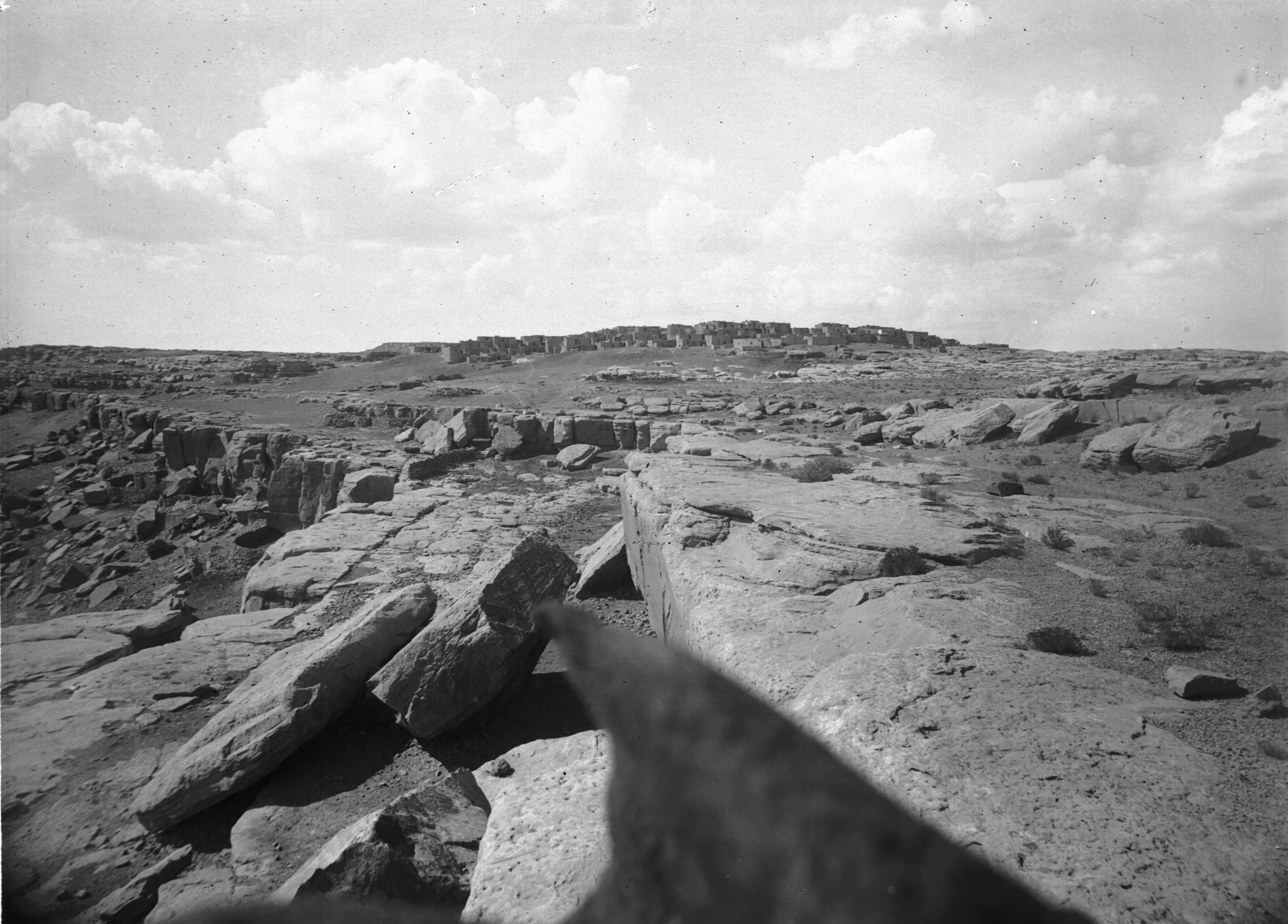
- The Hopi pueblo of Oraibi from the southwest

- Location in Navajo County and the state of Arizona

- Location in Arizona Location in the United States
- Coordinates: 35°52′33″N 110°38′25″W
- Country: United States
- State: Arizona
- County: Navajo
- Elevation: 6,057 ft (1,846 m)
- Time zone: MST
- GNIS feature ID: 45584

Oraibi, also referred to as Old Oraibi, is a Hopi village in Navajo County, Arizona, United States, in the northeastern part of the state. Known as Orayvi by the native inhabitants, it is on Third Mesa on the Hopi Reservation near Kykotsmovi Village. Oraibi was founded sometime around 1100 CE, making it one of the oldest continuously inhabited settlements in the United States.

== History ==
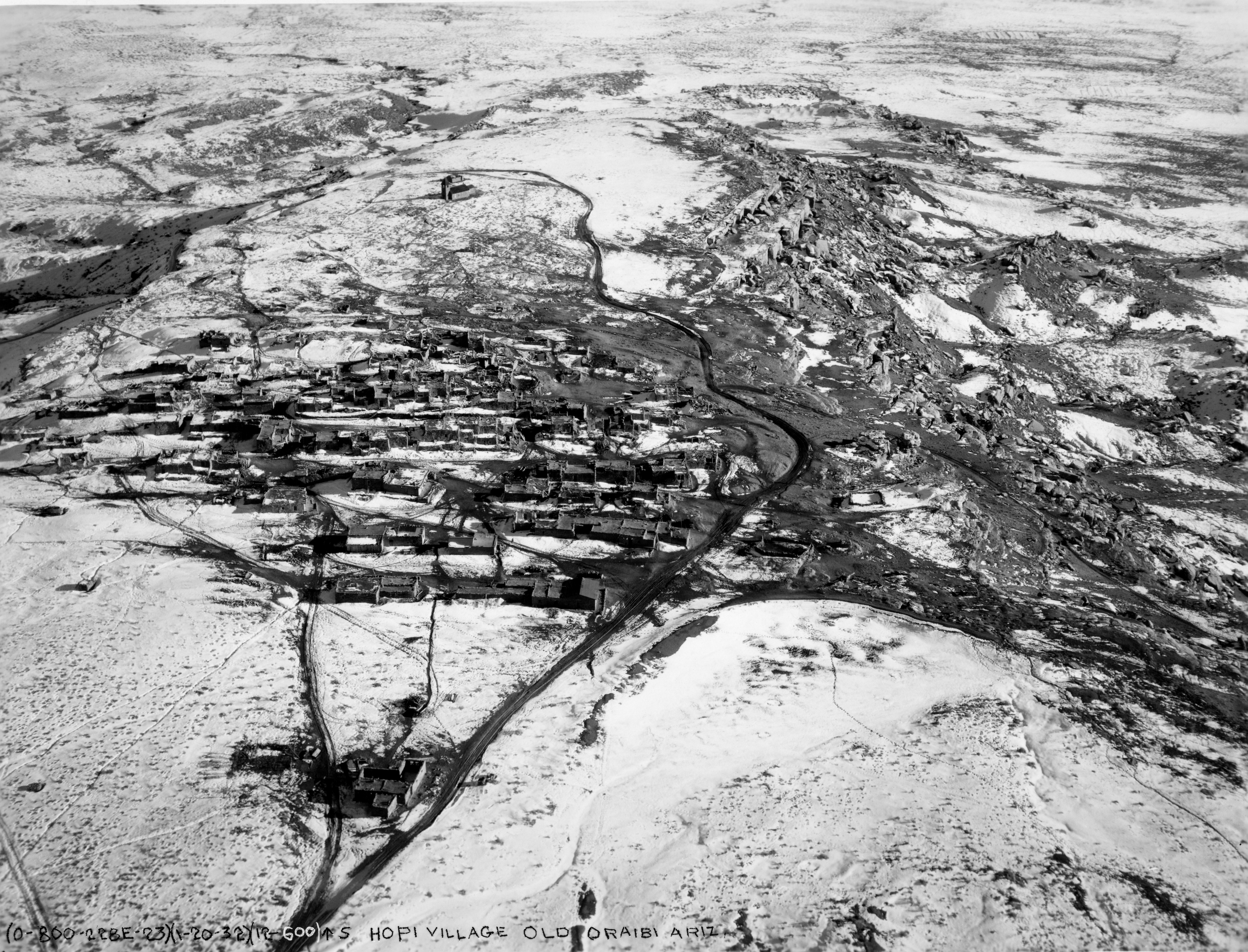
Oraibi in the 1940s

Oraibi is one of the three oldest U.S. cities along with Acoma Pueblo and Taos Pueblo. Archaeologists speculate that a series of severe droughts in the late 13th century forced the Hopi to abandon several smaller villages in the region and consolidate within a few population centers, Oraibi being one of them. As Oraibi's population grew considerably, it became the most influential of the Hopi settlements. By 1890, the village was estimated to have a population of 905, about half of the 1,824 estimated to be living in all of the Hopi settlements at the time.

Oraibi remained unknown to European explorers until about 1540 when Spanish explorer Pedro de Tovar (who was part of the Coronado expedition) encountered the Hopi while searching for the legendary Seven Cities of Gold. Contact with the Europeans remained infrequent until 1629 when the San Francisco mission was established in the village. In 1680 the Pueblo Revolt resulted in decreased Spanish influence in the area and the closing of the mission. Subsequent attempts to reestablish the missions in Hopi villages were met with repeated failures. The former mission is still visible today as a ruin.

=== Split ===
Hopi interaction with outsiders slowly increased during 1850–1860 due to missionaries, traders, and surveyors for the US government. Contact remained sporadic and informal until 1870 when an Indian agent was appointed to the Hopi, followed by the establishment of the Hopi Indian Agency in Keams Canyon in 1874.

Interaction with the US government increased with the establishment of the Hopi Reservation in 1882. This led to a number of changes for the traditional Hopi way of life. Missionary efforts intensified and Hopi children were moved from their homes in order to attend school, exposing them to new cultural influences.

In 1890 a number of residents more receptive to the new cultural influences moved closer to the trading post to establish Kykotsmovi Village, sometimes called New Oraibi. The continuing tension caused by the ideological schism between the "friendlies" ("New Hopi" to the traditional Hopi), those who were open to these cultural influences, and the "hostiles" (or "Traditionalists" led by Yukiuma) who opposed them (those who desired to preserve Hopi ways) led to an event called the "Oraibi Split" in 1906. Tribal leaders on differing sides of the schism engaged in a bloodless competition to determine the outcome, which resulted in the expulsion of the hostiles (traditionalists), who left to found the village of Hotevilla. Subsequent efforts by the displaced residents to reintegrate resulted in an additional split, with the second group founding Bacavi.

With the loss of much of its population, Oraibi lost its place as the center of Hopi culture. Although the Hopi tribal constitution, adopted in 1939, provides each village with a seat on the tribal council, Hotevilla, where most of the traditional Hopi settled, has declined to elect a representative and maintains independence from the tribal council. Kykotsmovi Village is now the seat of the Hopi tribal government.

== Today ==
- Old Oraibi
- U.S. National Register of Historic Places
- U.S. National Historic Landmark District
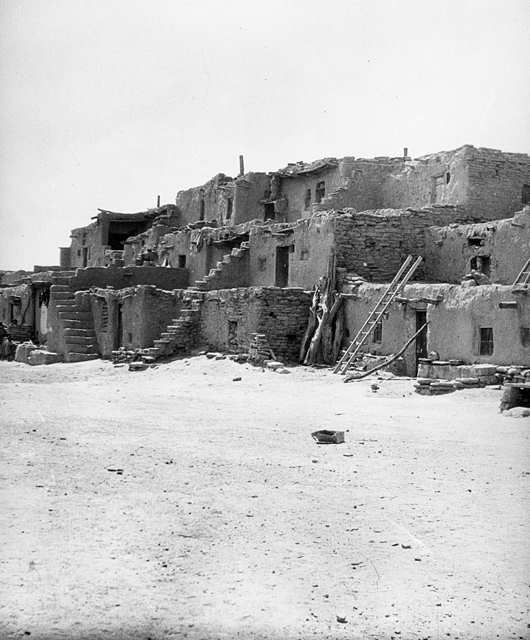
- Oraibi village, c. 1899

- Location within Arizona Location within the United States
- Area: 800 acres (320 ha)
- Built: 1150
- NRHP reference No.: 66000188

Significant dates
- Added to NRHP: October 15, 1966
- Designated NHLD: July 19, 1964

In spite of the "friendly" ("New Hopi") outcome of the Oraibi Split, Old Oraibi has since maintained a more traditional Hopi way of life and has resisted the adoption of the more modern culture visible in Kykotsmovi. While visitors to the pueblo are welcomed (a short road connects to Arizona State Route 264), the residents tend to be very private and do not allow photographs to be taken in the town.

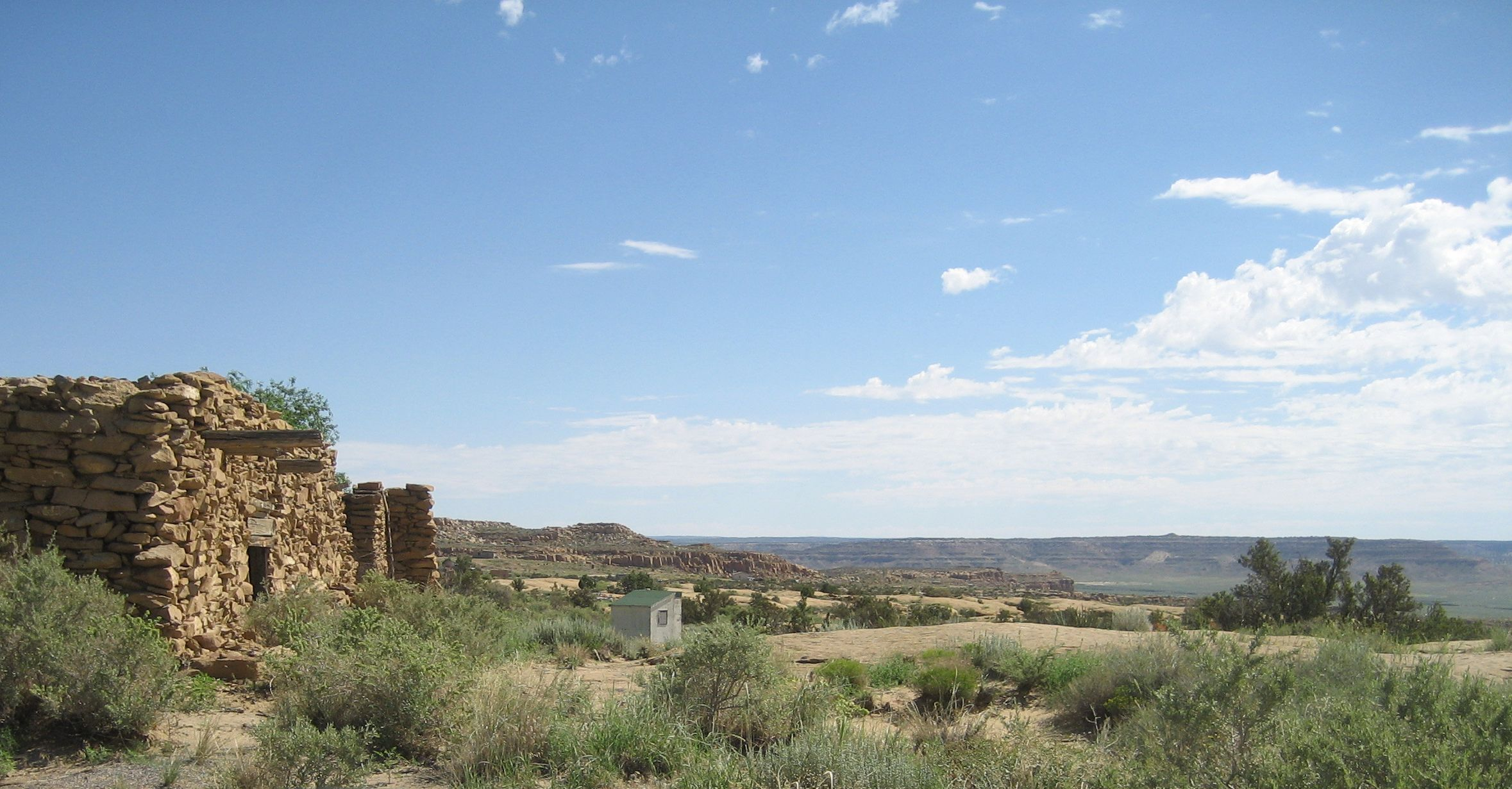
Abandoned house and the outskirts of Oraibi village

Old Oraibi is listed on the National Register of Historic Places and was declared a National Historic Landmark in 1964.

== Cultural references ==
Oraibi features prominently in an extended essay by Aby Warburg, Schlangenritual: Ein Reisebericht, a transcript of a lecture given in Kreuzlingen, Switzerland in 1923 (English translation "Images from the Region of the Pueblo Indians of North America"; also translated into many other languages). Warburg visited Oraibi in 1896 and with the help of Henry Voth attended a ritual spring dance. He found in the symbolism of the Hopi, in particular the snake symbol, a key to understanding similar symbols in other cultures. Warburg took several pictures of Oraibi and of the Hopi ceremonies.

Chapter VIII of Indian agent Leo Crane’s 1925 book “Indians of the Painted Desert” is titled ‘Old Oraibi’. It describes the shifting factions of the Hopi of the area in the early 20th century.

Hopi life in Oraibi is also described in Don C. Talayesva's autobiography, Sun chief, the Autobiography of a Hopi Indian. Talayesva was born in Oraibi in 1890, where he was raised as a traditional Hopi. Talayesva started working in 1938 with a Yale University anthropologist, Leo Simmons, who helped him write his autobiography.

Hopi educator, writer, and potter Polingaysi Qöyawayma (1892–1990) related stories of growing up in Oraibi in her 1964 autobiography No Turning Back.

The social anthropologist Sherry Ortner uses the phrase "another pot from Old Oraibi" to characterize a style of exhaustive "thickness" in ethnographic writing which—hubristically, in her view—attempts a "holistic" comprehension of the culture under scrutiny.
