= Keams Canyon, Arizona =

CDP in Navajo County, Arizona

Keams Canyon Pongsikya
- CDP
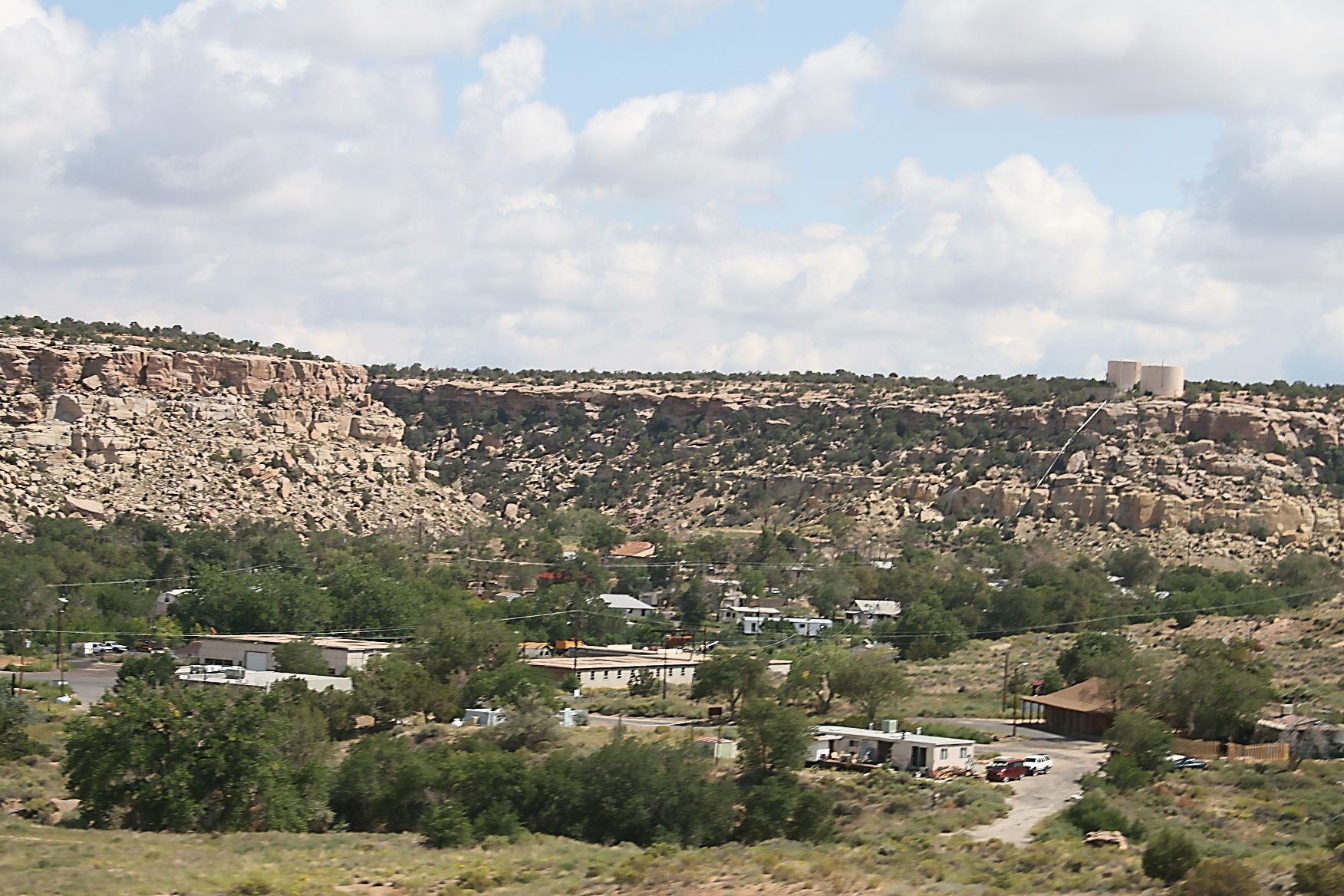
- Keams Canyon, as seen from the Arizona SR 264, looking east

- Location in Navajo County and the state of Arizona

- Location in the United States
- Coordinates: 35°49′38″N 110°14′15″W
- Country: United States
- State: Arizona
- County: Navajo

Area
  - Total: 16.65 sq mi (43.12 km^{2})
  - Land: 16.63 sq mi (43.07 km^{2})
  - Water: 0.019 sq mi (0.05 km^{2})
- Elevation: 6,427 ft (1,959 m)

Population (2020)
  - Total: 265
  - Density: 15.9/sq mi (6.15/km^{2})
- Time zone: UTC-7 (MST)
- ZIP code: 86034
- Area code: 928
- FIPS code: 04-37130
- GNIS feature ID: 2408463

Keams Canyon (Hopi: Pongsikya or Pongsikvi; Navajo: Lókʼaaʼdeeshjin) is a census-designated place (CDP) in Navajo County, Arizona, United States, on the Hopi Reservation. The population was 304 at the 2010 census.

Pongsikya is a narrow box canyon that is named after a plant of edible greens that survived along the seasonal stream that drains from Antelope Mesa and flows through the 3 mi (5 km) long canyon. Here William Keam, and then his cousin Thomas Keam, operated a trading post during the last quarter of the nineteenth century. They served the Navajo Indians and opened the door to commercial trade for the Hopi Indians. The nearest trading post was some 50 mi (80 km) away and Keam's trading post was 13 mi (21 km) east of the Hopi Indian's settlements on First Mesa. With the opportunity for full year round trade nearby, the regional Indians quickly identified the canyon with the traders and the name Keams Canyon took hold.

== Geography ==
According to the United States Census Bureau, the CDP has a total area of 9.3 square miles (24 km^{2}), all land.

== Demographics ==
Historical population
Census	Pop.	Note	%±
2000	260		—
2010	304		16.9%
2020	265		−12.8%
U.S. Decennial Census

Languages (2000)	Percent
Spoke English at home	61.8%
Spoke Tewa at home	20.6%
Spoke Hopi at home	17.7%

As of the census of 2000, there were 260 people, 74 households, and 44 families residing in the CDP. The population density was 28.0 inhabitants per square mile (10.8/km^{2}). There were 106 housing units at an average density of 11.4 per square mile (4.4/km^{2}). The racial makeup of the CDP was 7.7% White, 0.4% Black or African American, 89.6% Native American, and 2.3% from two or more races. 1.9% of the population were Hispanic or Latino of any race.

There were 74 households, out of which 32.4% had children under the age of 18 living with them, 32.4% were married couples living together, 20.3% had a female householder with no husband present, and 39.2% were non-families. 33.8% of all households were made up of individuals, and none had someone living alone who was 65 years of age or older. The average household size was 2.72 and the average family size was 3.56.

In the CDP, the population was spread out, with 23.8% under the age of 18, 10.4% from 18 to 24, 35.8% from 25 to 44, 26.5% from 45 to 64, and 3.5% who were 65 years of age or older. The median age was 34 years. For every 100 females, there were 124.1 males. For every 100 females age 18 and over, there were 135.7 males.

The median income for a household in the CDP was $35,694, and the median income for a family was $36,111. Males had a median income of $28,889 versus $35,272 for females. The per capita income for the CDP was $14,619. About 10.5% of families and 23.4% of the population were below the poverty line, including 28.6% of those under the age of eighteen and none of those 65 or over.

== Education ==
The Cedar Unified School District serves Keams Canyon. The closed White Cone High School (2005–2012) was in the district and town.

The tribal (affiliated with the Bureau of Indian Education) and open Hopi Junior/Senior High School is also located in Keams Canyon.
