= Hopi language =

Uto-Aztecan language of Arizona, US

Hopi
- Hopilàvayi
- Native to: United States
- Region: Northeastern Arizona
- Ethnicity: 7,400 Hopis (Golla 2007)
- Native speakers: 6,100 (2015 census); 40 monolinguals
- Language family: Uto-Aztecan: Northern Uto-Aztecan; Hopi
- Dialects: First Mesa / Polacca; Mishongnovi / Toreva; Shipaulovi / Sipaulovi; Third Mesa / Oraibi
- Writing system: Latin script

Language codes
- ISO 639-3: hop
- Glottolog: hopi1249
- ELP: Hopi
- Hopi is classified as Vulnerable by the UNESCO Atlas of the World's Languages in Danger.

- People: Hopi
- Language: Hopilàvayi, Hand Talk
- Country: Hopitutskwa

Hopi (Hopi: Hopílavayi) is a Uto-Aztecan language spoken by the Hopi people (a Puebloan group) of northeastern Arizona, United States.

The use of Hopi has gradually declined over the course of the 20th century. In 1990, it was estimated that more than 5,000 people could speak Hopi as a native language (approximately 75% of the population), but only 40 of them were monolingual in Hopi. The 1998 language survey of 200 Hopi people showed that 100% of Hopi elders (60 years or older) were fluent, but fluency in adults (40–59) was only 84%, 50% in young adults (20–39), and 5% in children (2–19).

Despite the apparent decline, Hopi and Navajo both are supported by bilingual education programs in Arizona, and children acquire the Native American languages as their first language. More recently, Hopi language programs for children on the reservation have been implemented.

== Teaching and language revitalization efforts ==
The Hopi language has been part of several language revitalization projects.

In December 2000, public radio station KUYI 88.1 FM went on the air. The National Public Radio affiliate was founded to preserve the Hopi culture and language by broadcasting to the community. Online streaming was introduced on June 21, 2010.

A comprehensive Hopi-English dictionary edited by Emory Sekaquaptewa and others has been published, and a group, the Hopi Literacy Project, has focused its attention on promoting the language. As of 2013, "a pilot language revitalization project, the Hopi Lavayi Nest Model Program, for families with children birth through 5," is being planned for the village of Sipaulovi.

In 2004, Mesa Media, a nonprofit organization, was created to help revitalize the language.

Since 2019, more recent Hopi language revitalization programs have been reported, involving language immersion for children.

== Language variation ==
Benjamin Whorf identifies four varieties (dialects) of Hopi:

- First Mesa (or Whorf's Polacca)
- Mishongnovi (or Whorf's Toreva)
- Shipaulovi (or Whorf's Sipaulovi)
- Third Mesa (or Whorf's Oraibi)

First Mesa is spoken on First Mesa (which is the eastern mesa) in Polacca village in Walpi pueblo and in other neighboring communities. (Note: Polacca is at the base of First Mesa, unlike the other villages, which are on the top of the mesa. Polacca is shared by Hopi and Tewa peoples.) A community of Arizona Tewa live on First Mesa, and its members speak Tewa, in addition to a variety of Hopi and English and Spanish.

Mishongnovi is spoken on Second Mesa (which is the central mesa) in Mishongnovi village. Mishongnovi has few speakers compared to First and Third Mesa dialects. Shipaulovi is also spoken on Second Mesa in Shipaulovi village, which is close to Mishongnovi village. Whorf notes that other villages on Second Mesa are of unknown dialectal affiliation.

An introductory textbook (Kalectaca (1978)) has been written by a Shongopavi speaker. Shongopavi is another village on the Second Mesa, but its relation to other dialects has not been analyzed. The Third Mesa dialect is spoken on Third Mesa (which is the western mesa) at Oraibi village and in neighboring communities, as well as in Moenkopi village, which lies off Third Mesa and at a distance west of it.

The first published analysis of the Hopi language is Benjamin Whorf's study of Mishongnovi Hopi. His work was based primarily on a single off-reservation informant, but it was later checked by other reservation speakers. In his study, he states that Mishongnovi is the most archaic and phonemically complex of the dialects. The Third Mesa dialect preserves some older relics that have been lost in Mishongnovi.

Malotki (1983) reports that Third Mesa speakers of younger generations have lost the labialization feature of w on the different subject subordinator -qw after the vowels a, i, e, u where they have -q instead. This loss of labialization is also found on the simultaneity marker where younger speakers have -kyang against older -kyangw. In words with kw or ngw in the syllable coda, the labialization is also lost:

naksu (younger) vs. nakwsu (older) "he started out"
hikni (younger) vs. kikwni (older) "he will drink"
tuusungti (younger) vs. tuusungwti (older) "he got frozen"

== Language contact ==
Hopi is part of the Pueblo linguistic area (a Sprachbund) along with members of the Tanoan family, the Keresan languages, Zuni, and Navajo.

Hopi speakers have traditionally used Hopi as the language of communication with Zuni. They have also been in close contact with a Tanoan language for over 300 years since the Arizona Tewa, who speak Tewa, moved from the Galisteo Basin following the Pueblo Revolt to reside on First Mesa. The Arizona Tewa have traditionally acted as translators for the Hopi-speaking Tewa, Hopi, Navajo, Spanish, and English.

The Hopi had cursory contact with Spanish beginning with the explorers in 1540. In 1629 a small group of Franciscan missionaries started arriving in Hopi territory, building a church the following year. They remained there until 1680 when the Pueblo Revolt occurred and the Hopi expelled the Spanish from the region. Both the practices of the Spanish when there, and the stories of negative experiences of Puebloan refugees from the Rio Grande region, contributed to a Hopi attitude where acculturation was resisted or rejected.

A number of studies have focused on loanwords borrowed into Hopi from other languages.

== Phonology ==
=== Vowels ===
There are six basic vowels in Hopi:

	Front		Non-front	
	unr.	rnd.	unr.	rnd.
Close	i ⟨i⟩		ɨ ⟨u⟩	
Mid	ɛ ⟨e⟩	ø ⟨ö⟩		o ⟨o⟩
Open			a ⟨a⟩	

/ø/ descends from Proto-Uto-Aztecan *o, while Hopi /o/ descends from *u.

=== Consonants ===
Hopi dialects differ in their number of consonants. Below are two separate inventories of the Third Mesa and Mishongnovi dialects. The Third Mesa inventory has orthographic symbols and IPA transcriptions of those symbols when the IPA symbol differs from the orthographic symbol.

Third Mesa Hopi
	Labial	Alveolar	Retroflex/ Palatal	Velar		Post- velar	Glottal
	Labial	Alveolar	Retroflex/ Palatal	plain	labial	Post- velar	Glottal
Nasal	m	n	ɲ ⟨ngy⟩	ŋ ⟨ng⟩	ŋʷ ⟨ngw⟩		
Plosive	p	t	c ⟨ky⟩	k	kʷ ⟨kw⟩	k̠ ⟨q⟩	ʔ ⟨’⟩
Affricate		ts					
Fricative	β ⟨v⟩	s	ʐ ⟨r⟩				h
Approximant		l	j ⟨y⟩		w		

Mishongnovi Hopi
		Labial	Alveolar		Retroflex/ Palatal	Velar		Post- velar	Glottal
		Labial	plain	sibilant	Retroflex/ Palatal	plain	labial	Post- velar	Glottal
Nasal	voiceless	m̥	n̥					ŋ̠̊	
Nasal	voiced	m	n		ɲ		ŋʷ	ŋ̠	
Plosive/ Affricate	tenuis	p	t	ts	c	k	kʷ	k̠	ʔ
Plosive/ Affricate	preaspirated	ʰp	ʰt	ʰts		ʰk	ʰkʷ	ʰk̠	
Fricative	voiceless	(f)		s	(ʂ)				h
Fricative	voiced	v			ʐ				
Approximant	voiceless		l̥		ȷ̊		w̥		
Approximant	voiced		l		j		w		

As seen above, the Mishongnovi dialect has a larger number of consonants when compared with the Third Mesa dialect. The additional consonants are a series of preaspirated stops and a series of voiceless sonorants.

There is idiolectal free variation with the voiced labial fricative represented with ⟨v⟩, which varies between labiodental and bilabial [v ~ β]. Before a consonant (word-medially) and at the end of words, it is not voiced although its realization is dependent upon dialect; Third Mesa speakers have [p] while Mishongnovi speakers have [f].

The alveolar sibilants /ts/ and /s/ are apical. In some Third Mesa speakers, they are palatalized to [tsʲ] and [sʲ], which can sound similar to /tʃ/ and /ʃ/ of English. In Mishongnovi, /ts/ is palatalized when at the beginning of syllables and non-palatalized elsewhere.

Hopi has a number of stop contrasts at the velar place of articulation that occur before the low vowel /a/. Elsewhere, the contrasts are neutralized. The velar in environments of neutralization is called "neutral" k by Jeanne (1978). Before the front vowels /i/ and /ɛ/, it is palatalized with a fronted articulation and following palatal glide [j]. Thus, ⟨ki⟩ and ⟨ke⟩ are [cji] and [cjɛ], respectively. Before the non-front vowels /ɨ/ and /o/, it is a typical velar: ⟨ku⟩ is [kɨ] and ⟨ko⟩ is [ko]. Before the front rounded vowel /ø/, it has a backed articulation: ⟨kö⟩ is [ḵø]. Before /a/, there is a phonemic contrast with fronted velar with following palatal glide and the backed velar. Complicating this pattern are words borrowed from Spanish that have a velar followed by a low vowel. With the addition of these loanwords, a third velar contrast has been introduced into Hopi. Words with this borrowed velar are "neutral" and typically velar in articulation. Thus, there is a distinction between ⟨kya⟩ [cja] and ⟨qa⟩ [ḵa] in native words both of which are distinct from ⟨ka⟩ [ka] in loanwords.

The precise phonetics of these k consonants is unclear due to vague descriptions in the literature. Voegelin (1956) suggests that the fronted articulation represented by ⟨ky⟩ is distinguished more by presence of the palatal glide than by the difference in the articulatory position of the dorsal contact. He also mentions that the backed sound represented by ⟨q⟩ is "not-so-far-back". This suggests that this sound is post-velar and not quite uvular. Malotki (1983) describes the fronted sound and the sound from Spanish loanwords as palatal while the backed ones are velar. Whorf (1946) describes the fronted form as palatal with palatal glide before some vowels, The form from Spanish loanwords as "ordinary k", and the backed form as velar. Whorf's letter to Clyde Kluckhohn in Kluckhohn & MacLeish (1955) describes the backed velar as being like Arabic or Nootka ⟨q⟩, which suggests a uvular articulation. Whorf's phonemicization of Mishongnovi posits the fronted version occurring before all vowels but /ø/ (with a fronted allophone before /i/, /ɛ/, and /a/); the backed form occurring before non-high vowels (/ɛ/, /ø/, and /a/); and the form from Spanish loanwords before /a/.

Similarly to the velar stops, Hopi has a fronted dorsal nasal and a backed dorsal nasal represented as ⟨ngy⟩ and ⟨ng⟩, respectively. The fronted nasal is palatal [ɲ]. The backed nasal is described as velar ŋ in Third Mesa speech and thus forms a "neutral" series with "neutral" k. In Mishongnovi speech, Whorf describes the backed nasal as having the more rear articulation of the backed dorsal: [ŋ̠].

The retroflex sound represented with ⟨r⟩ varies between a retroflex fricative ([ʐ]) and a flap [ɾ], although the fricative realization is much more common. In Mishongnovi, this sound is only weakly fricative. In syllable coda position, it is devoiced to a voiceless fricative [ʂ].

The preaspirated stops /ʰp, ʰt, ʰts, ʰkʷ, ʰk, ʰq/ and voiceless sonorants /m̥, n̥, ŋ̠̊, l̥, ȷ̊, w̥/ of Mishongnovi only occur in syllable coda position. However, they do contrast with plain stops and voiced sonorants in this position. Whorf notes that the preaspirated stops also contrast with a similar sequence of /h/ + stop.

=== Syllable structure ===
The most common syllable clusters are CV and CVC.

The CVCC cluster is very rare due to limited number of CC combinations in the language. This also makes it unusual to find the intrasyllabic clusters C-C and CC-C.

=== Stress ===
The stress pattern in Hopi follows a simple rule that applies to nearly all words.

- In words with one or two vowels, the first vowel is stressed.
- Where there are more than two vowels, the first vowel is stressed if it is long or it is directly followed by two consonants. Otherwise, the second vowel is stressed.

Some exceptions to this rule are sikisve "car", wehekna "spill" and warikiwta "running". We would expect the second vowel to be stressed but in fact the first one is stressed in these examples.

=== Tone ===
The Third Mesa dialect of Hopi has developed tone on long vowels, diphthongs, and vowel + sonorant sequences. This dialect has either falling tones or level tones.

The falling tone (high-low) in the Third Mesa dialect corresponds to either a vowel + preaspirated consonant, a vowel + voiceless sonorant, or a vowel + h sequence in the Second Mesa dialect recorded by Whorf.

== Orthography ==
Hopi is written using the Latin alphabet.

The vowel letters correspond to the phonemes of Hopi as follows, and long vowels are written double.

IPA		/a/	/ɛ/	/ɪ/	/o/	/ɨ/	/ø/
orthography	short	⟨a⟩	⟨e⟩	⟨i⟩	⟨o⟩	⟨u⟩	⟨ö⟩
orthography	long	⟨aa⟩	⟨ee⟩	⟨ii⟩	⟨oo⟩	⟨uu⟩	⟨öö⟩

Consonants are written:

- ⟨’⟩ /ʔ/
- ⟨h⟩ /h/
- ⟨k⟩ /k/
- ⟨ky⟩ /kʲ/
- ⟨kw⟩ /kʷ/
- ⟨l⟩ /l/
- ⟨m⟩ /m/
- ⟨n⟩ /n/
- ⟨ng⟩ /ŋ/
- ⟨ngw⟩ /ŋʷ/
- ⟨ngy⟩ /ɲ/
- ⟨p⟩ /p/
- ⟨q⟩ /k̠/
- ⟨qw⟩ /k̠ʷ/
- ⟨r⟩ /ʐ/
- ⟨s⟩ /s/
- ⟨t⟩ /t/
- ⟨ts⟩ /ts/
- ⟨v⟩ /β/
- ⟨w⟩ /w/
- ⟨y⟩ /j/

Falling accent is marked with a grave ⟨`⟩: tsirò 'birds'.

To distinguish certain consonants written as digraphs from similar looking phonemes meeting across syllable boundaries, a period is used: kwaahu ('eagle') but kuk.wuwàaqe ('to follow tracks').

The Deseret alphabet, an alphabetical system developed by Mormon scholars in modern-day Utah, was used for academic notation of the language in a handwritten English–Hopi dictionary made in 1860 that was rediscovered in 2014.

== Morphology ==
=== Suffixes ===
Hopi uses suffixes for a variety of purposes. Some examples are:

suffix	purpose	example	meaning
ma	go along	wayma	walking along
numa	go around	waynuma	walking around
mi	to, towards	itamumi	towards us
ni	future	tuuvani	will throw
ngwu	habitual suffix	tuuvangwu	usually throws
ve/pe	location	Ismo'walpe	at Ismo'wala
q	distance suffix	atkyamiq	all the way to the bottom
sa	only	suksa	only one

Hopi also has free postpositions:

akw	with (instrumental)
angkw	from
ep	at/in/on

Nouns are marked as oblique by either the suffixes -t for simple nouns or -y for dual nouns (those referring to exactly two individuals), possessed nouns or plural nouns.

Some examples are shown below:

nominative	oblique	meaning
himutski	himutskit	shrub
iisaw	iisawuy	coyote
itam	itamuy	we/us
nuva	nuvat	snow
nu'	nuy	I/me
paahu	paahut	spring water
pam	put	he/she/it
puma	pumuy	they
tuuwa	tuuwat	sand
um	ung	you

Verbs are also marked by suffixes but these are not used in a regular pattern. For example, the suffixes -lawu and -ta are both used to make a simple verb into a durative one (implying the action is ongoing and not yet complete) but it is hard to predict which suffix applies to which verbs. Second language learners of Hopi usually simply learn this by rote.

There are some gender specific terms in Hopi:

male speech	female speech	meaning
a'ni	hin'ur	very
kwakwha	askwali	thank you
lolma	nukwangw	good
owi, 'wi	oo'o, 'wiya	yes

=== Morphological processes ===
- Elision – when the stress-shift would cause a clipped vowel not in the first syllable to have a low stress, that vowel is elided.
- Lenition – initial p becomes v when it becomes internal to a word or when the word is preceded by another word used as an adjectival or an incorporated verbal modifier.
- Reduplication – stem-initial CV, stem-final CV and word-final V are reduplicated.

== Syntax ==
=== Word order ===
The simplest type of sentence in Hopi is simply a subject and a predicate: 'Maana wuupa' (the girl is tall).

However, many Hopi sentences also include an object, which is inserted between the subject and the verb. Thus, Hopi is a subject–object–verb language.

=== Case ===
Nouns are marked as subject or oblique, as shown above.

Pronouns are also marked as either nominative or oblique. For example, the singular subject pronoun "you" in Hopi is um, and the form for the singular object pronoun is ung.

Demonstratives are marked by case in Hopi, shown first in their nominative form and then in their oblique form:

- iˈ/it – this
- pam/put – it
- miˈ/mit – that
- ima/imuy – these
- puma/pumuy – them
- mima/mimuy – those

=== Number ===
Hopi has plural verbs. Dual noun subjects take the dual suffix -vit but singular verbs. Hopi does not have dual pronouns; instead, the plural pronouns may be used with singular verbs for a dual meaning. Noun and verb plurality is indicated, among other devices, by partial reduplication, marked in the gloss below with a tilde (~).

	Noun subject	Pronoun subject
Singular	taaqa nöösa	ni’ nöösa
Singular	a man ate	I ate
Dual	taaqa-vit nöösa	itam nöösa
Dual	two men ate	we two ate
Plural	taa~taqt nöö~nösa	itam nöö~nösa
Plural	several men ate	we all ate

== Metalinguistics ==
Benjamin Lee Whorf, a well-known linguist and still one of the foremost authorities on the relationships obtaining between southwestern and Central American languages, used Hopi to exemplify his argument that one's worldview is affected by one's language and vice versa. Among Whorf's best-known claims was that Hopi had "no words, grammatical forms, construction or expressions that refer directly to what we call 'time.'" Whorf's statement has been misunderstood by many to mean that Hopi has no concept of duration or succession of time at all, but in fact Whorf scholars like Penny Lee and John A Lucy have argued that he meant only that the Hopi have no conception of time as an object or a substance that may be divided and subdivided. Furthermore, according to John A. Lucy, many of Whorf's critics have failed to read his writings accurately, preferring instead to proffer uncharitable caricatures of his arguments.

== See also ==
- Hopi Dictionary: Hopìikwa Lavàytutuveni
- Qatsi trilogy

== Sources ==
- Brew, J. O. (1979). "Hopi prehistory and history to 1850". In Ortiz, A. (ed.). Handbook of North American Indians: Southwest. Vol. 9. Washington, D.C.: Smithsonian Institution. pp. 514–523.
- Connelly, John C. (1979). "Hopi social organization". In Ortiz, A. (ed.). Handbook of North American Indians: Southwest. Vol. 9. Washington, D.C.: Smithsonian Institution. pp. 539–553.
- Dockstader, Frederick J. (1955). "Spanish loanwords in Hopi: A preliminary checklist". International Journal of American Linguistics. 21 (2): 157–159. doi:10.1086/464324. S2CID 143816567.
- Harrington, John P. (1913). [Linguistic fieldnotes based on work with a speaker of Oraibi Hopi]. (National Anthropological Archives, Smithsonian Institution).
- Hill, Kenneth C. (1997), "Spanish loanwords in Hopi.", in Hill, J.H.; Mistry, P.J.; Campbell, L. (eds.), The life of language: Papers in linguistics in honor of William Bright, Trends in linguistics: Studies and monographs, Berlin: Mouton de Gruyter., pp. 19–24
- Hopi Dictionary Project (University of Arizona Bureau of Applied Research in Anthropology). (1998). Hopi dictionary: Hopìikwa Lavàytutuveni: A Hopi–English dictionary of the Third Mesa dialect with an English–Hopi finder list and a sketch of Hopi grammar. Tucson, Arizona: University of Arizona Press. ISBN 0-8165-1789-4
- Hymes, D. H. (1956). "The supposed Spanish loanword in Hopi for 'jaybird'". International Journal of American Linguistics. 22 (2): 186–187. doi:10.1086/464362. S2CID 143642814.
- Jeanne, LaVerne Masayesva (1978). Aspects of Hopi grammar (PhD thesis). MIT. hdl:1721.1/16325.
- Jeanne, LaVerne Masayesva (1982). "Some phonological rules of Hopi". International Journal of American Linguistics. 48 (3): 245–270. doi:10.1086/465734. JSTOR 1264788. S2CID 143643843.
- Kalectaca, Milo (1978). Lessons in Hopi. Tucson, Arizona: University of Arizona Press.
- Kennard, Edward A. (1963). "Linguistic acculturation in Hopi". International Journal of American Linguistics. 29 (1): 36–41. doi:10.1086/464709. S2CID 143928841.
- Kennard, Edward A.; Yava, Albert (1999). Field Mouse Goes to War: Tusan Homichi Tuwvöta. Palmer Lake, Colorado: Filter Press.
- Kluckhohn, Clyde; MacLeish, Kenneth (1955). "Moencopi variations from Whorf's Second Mesa Hopi". International Journal of American Linguistics. 21 (2): 150–156. doi:10.1086/464323. JSTOR 1263941. S2CID 143319549.
- Lucy, John (1992). Language Diversity and Thought: A Reformulation of the Linguistic Relativity Hypothesis. Studies in the Social and Cultural Foundations of Language. Cambridge: Cambridge University Press. ISBN 978-0521387972.
- Manaster-Ramer, Alexis (1986). "Genesis of Hopi tones". International Journal of American Linguistics. 52 (2): 154–160. doi:10.1086/466010. JSTOR 1265374. S2CID 144768505.
- Malotki, Ekkehart (1983). Hopi time: A linguistic analysis of the temporal concepts in the Hopi language. Trends in linguistics: Studies and monographs (No. 20). Berlin / New York / Amsterdam: Mouton De Gruyter. ISBN 90-279-3349-9.
- Seaman, P. David (1977). "Hopi Linguistics: An Annotated Bibliography". Anthropological Linguistics. 19 (2): 78–97. JSTOR 30027313.
- Seqaquaptewa, E. (1994). Iisaw niqw tsaayantotaqam tsiròot. Santa Fe, NM: Clear Light.
- Seqaquaptewa, E. (1994). Iisaw niqw yöngösonhoya. Santa Fe, NM: Clear Light.
- Stephen, Alexander M. (1936). Hopi journal of Alexander M. Stephen. Parsons, E. C. (Ed.). Columbia University contributions to anthropology (No. 23). New York: Columbia University Press.
- Titiev, Mischa (1946). "Suggestions for the further study of Hopi". International Journal of American Linguistics. 12 (2): 89–91. doi:10.1086/463895. S2CID 144830663.
- Voegelin, C. F. (1956). "Phonemicizing for dialect study: With reference to Hopi". Language. 32 (1): 116–135. doi:10.2307/410660. JSTOR 410660.
- Whorf, Benjamin Lee. (1936). [Notes on Hopi grammar and pronunciation; Mishongnovi forms]. In E. C. Parsons (Ed.), Hopi journal of Alexander M. Stephen (Vol. 2, pp. 1198–1326). Columbia University contributions to anthropology (No. 23). New York: Columbia University Press.
- Whorf, Benjamin Lee (1936). "The punctual and segmentative aspects of verbs in Hopi". Language. 12 (2): 127–131. doi:10.2307/408755. JSTOR 408755.
- Whorf, Benjamin Lee (1938). "Some verbal categories of Hopi". Language. 14 (4): 275–286. doi:10.2307/409181. JSTOR 409181.
- Whorf, Benjamin Lee (1941). "The relation of habitual thought and behavior to language". In Spier, L.; Hallowell, A. I.; Newman, S. S. (eds.). Language, culture, and personality: Essays in memory of Edward Sapir. Menasha, WI: Sapir Memorial Publication Fund. pp. 75–93.
- Whorf, Benjamin Lee (1946). "The Hopi language, Toreva dialect". In Osgood, C. (ed.). Linguistic structures of native America. Viking Fund publications in anthropology (No. 6). New York: The Viking Fund, Inc. pp. 158–183.
- Whorf, Benjamin Lee (1950). "An American Indian model of the universe". International Journal of American Linguistics. 16 (2): 67–72. doi:10.1086/464066. JSTOR 1262850. S2CID 54491985.
- Whorf, Benjamin Lee (1952). "Linguistic factors in the terminology of Hopi architecture". International Journal of American Linguistics. 19 (2): 141–145. doi:10.1086/464204. JSTOR 1262812. S2CID 144233449.
- Whorf, Benjamin Lee (1956). "Discussion of Hopi linguistics". In Carroll, J. B. (ed.). Language, thought, and reality: Selected writings of Benjamin L. Whorf. New York: John Wiley. pp. 102–111.
