= Dan Katchongva =

Hopi traditional leader (1860–1972)

Dan Katchongva (1860 (Old Oraibi) - February 22, 1972 (Hotevilla)) was a Hopi Native American traditional leader. Son of Yukiuma, keeper of the Fire Clan tablets, who founded Hotevilla in 1906. He is one of four Hopis (including Thomas Banyacya, David Monongye, and Dan Evehema) who decided or were appointed to communicate Hopi traditional wisdom and teachings, including the Hopi prophecies for the future, to the general public in 1946, after the use of the first two nuclear weapons on Japan. Katchongva was the eldest of the group of four knowledgeable Hopis, and the first to die. Kachongva was a member of the Sun Clan.

The transcript of a talk by Katchongva recorded January 29, 1970 was published in the traditional Hopi newsletter Techqua Ikachi in 1972, and has been widely republished in books, journals, and on the Internet.

According to the East West Journal (July 15, 1975) publication of this message, "Dan Katchongva, the Sun Clan leader in Hotevilla village, was told by his father, Yukiuma, that he would live to see the beginning of Purification Day. Dan died in 1972."

Katchongva's talk were also published as a booklet called "Hopi: A Message for All People" (White Roots of Peace, 1975).
