= Sachem =

Algonquian political office

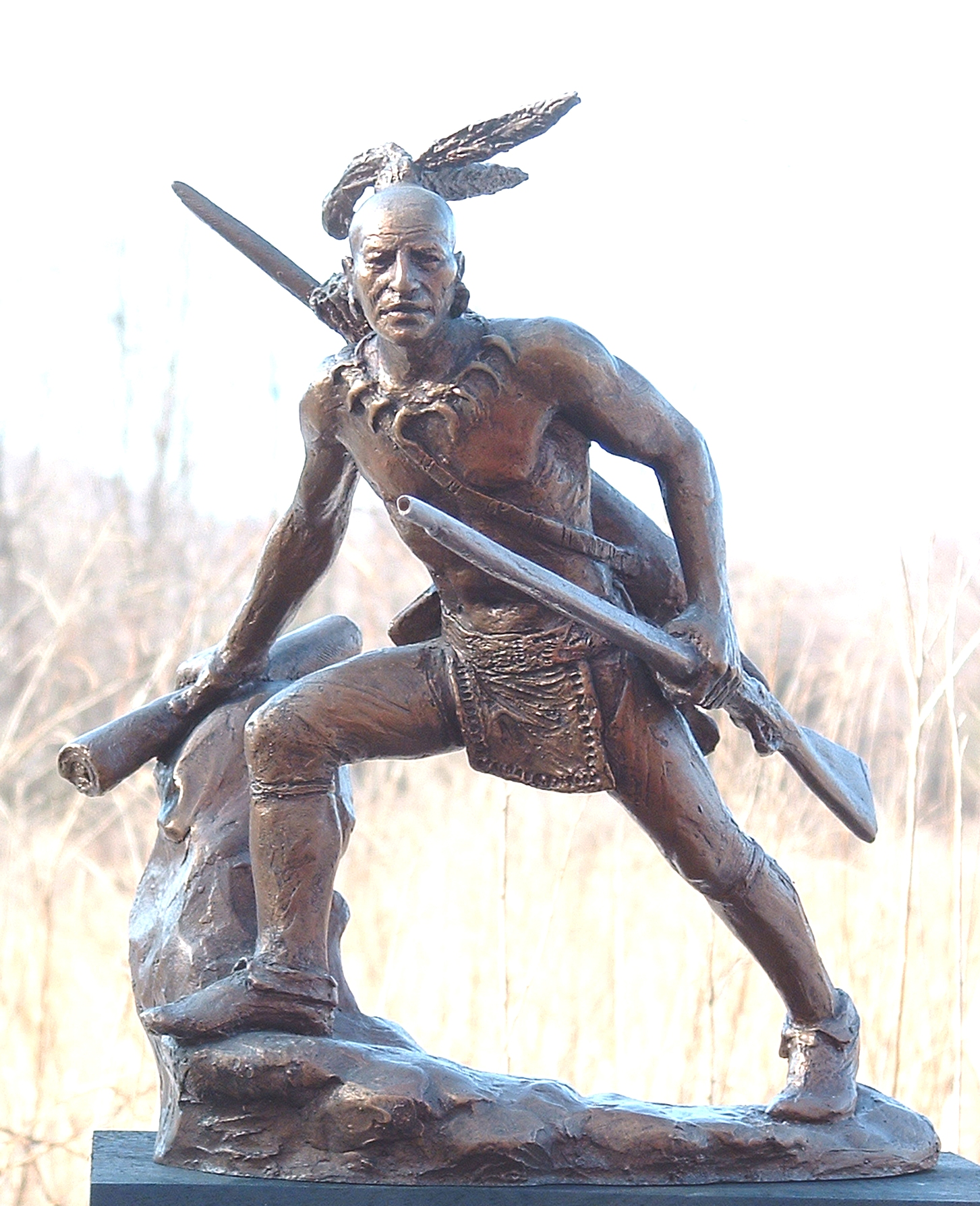
Statue of Daniel Nimham, a sachem of the Wappinger

Sachem /ˈseɪtʃəm/ or sagamore /ˈsæɡəmɔːr/ is a term for leaders of Algonquian polities along the northeastern coast of North America. It is also now used to refer to non-Royaner leaders in the Haudenosaunee Confederacy such as the councilors of each nation. Sachem and Sagamore are anglicizations of cognate terms (c. 1622) from different Eastern Algonquian languages. Some sources indicate that historically the sagamore was a lesser chief elected by a single band, while the Sachem was the head or representative elected by a tribe or group of bands; while others suggest the two terms were interchangeable. Sachems are appointed or elected officeholders and the office is not strictly hereditary. However, the choice of Sachem is at least partly based on the prominence of the individual's family or kinship ties to the previous Sachem.

== Etymology ==
The Oxford English Dictionary found a use as early as 1613. The term "Sagamore" appears in Noah Webster's first An American Dictionary of the English Language published in 1828, as well as the 1917 Webster's New International Dictionary.

One modern source explains:

According to Captain John Smith, who explored New England in 1614, the Massachusett tribes called their kings "sachems" while the Penobscots (of present-day Maine) used the term "sagamos" (anglicized as "sagamore"). Conversely, Deputy Governor Thomas Dudley of Roxbury wrote in 1631 that the kings in the Massachusetts Bay area were called sagamores, but were called sachems southward (in Plymouth). The two terms apparently came from the same root. Although "sagamore" has sometimes been defined by colonists and historians as a subordinate lord (or subordinate chief), modern opinion is that "sachem" and "sagamore" are dialectical variations of the same word.

=== Cognate words ===
Family	Language	Word	Notes
Eastern Algonquian	Proto-Eastern Algonquian	*sākimāw	theoretical reconstruction
Eastern Algonquian	Narragansett	sâchim	anglicized as sachem
Eastern Algonquian	Mohegan-Pequot	sôcum	anglicized as sachem
Eastern Algonquian	Lenape	sakima	derived from earlier form sakimaw
Eastern Algonquian	Eastern Abnaki	sakəma	anglicized as sagamore
Eastern Algonquian	Mi'kmaq	saqamaw	
Eastern Algonquian	Maliseet-Passamaquoddy	sakom	
Eastern Algonquian	Western Abnaki	sôgmô	
Eastern Algonquian	Wangunk	sequin	
Central Algonquian	Proto-Central Algonquian	*okimāwa	theoretical reconstruction
Central Algonquian	Anishinaabe	ogimaa	
Central Algonquian	Algonquin	ogimà	
Central Algonquian	Ottawa	gimaa	
Central Algonquian	Potawatomi	wgema	anglicised as Ogema
Central Algonquian	Eastern Swampy Cree	okimâw	
Central Algonquian	Northern East Cree	uchimaa	
Central Algonquian	Southern East Cree	uchimaa	
Central Algonquian	Naskapi	iiyuuchimaaw	
Central Algonquian	Miami-Illinois	akima	

== Sachems ==
The "great Sachem" (Southern New England Algonquian: massasoit sachem) whose aid was such a boon to the Plymouth Colony—although his motives were complex—is remembered today as simply Massasoit.

Another Sachem, Mahomet Weyonomon of the Mohegans, travelled to London in 1735 to petition King George II for fairer treatment of his people. He complained that their lands were becoming overrun by encroachment from white settlers. Other sachems include Awashonks, Weetamoo, Quaiapen, Uncas, Wonalancet, Askamaboo, Cheryll Toney Holley, Madockawando, Saunkskwa of Missitekw, Sam George and Samoset.

== Other uses ==
=== United States' politics ===
The leader of New York City's Tammany Hall was officially referred to as Sachem. In the 1940s, the legislature of Indiana created the honorary title of "Sagamore of the Wabash", analogous to Kentucky Colonel. In 1996, the government designated "Sachem of the Wabash" as a higher honor. There is also the Sachems, a secret society at Columbia University

=== Schools ===
- Sachem School District
- Algonquin Regional High School
- Laconia High School
- Middleborough High School
- Pentucket Regional High School
- Saugus High School
- Massapequa High School

== See also ==
- Cuauhtlatoani
- Elders
- Ghigau
- Harjo
- Irecha
- Kikmongwi
- Native American Elders
- Ravens and the Raven of Chota
- Shakes
- Skiagusta
- Tadodaho
- Teuctocaitl
- Tlatoani
- Tustenuggee
- Urriparacoxi
- Weroance
- Yakoyaner
