= Thomas Banyacya =

Hopi Native American leader (1909–1999)

Thomas Banyacya, Sr.
- Born: June 2, 1909; Moenkopi, Arizona, U.S.
- Died: February 6, 1999 (aged 89); Keams Canyon, Arizona, U.S.
- Education: Sherman Indian School Riverside, California, Bacone College
- Occupations: Hopi traditionalist leader, public figure, interpreter and spokesman for Hopi traditional spiritual and religious leaders
- Spouse: Fermina (nee Jenkins)

Thomas Banyacya, Sr. (June 2, 1909 – February 6, 1999) was a Hopi Native American traditionalist leader.

== Biography ==
Thomas Banyacya was born on June 2, 1909, and grew up in the village of Moenkopi, Arizona. He was a member of the Wolf, Fox, and Coyote clans. He first attended Sherman Indian School in Riverside, California and then Bacone College in Muskogee, Oklahoma.

Thomas Banyacya lived in Kykotsmovi, Arizona, on Hopi Tutskwa, the Hopi Reservation. During World War II, Banyacya was a draft resister, who spent time in prison over seven years each time he refused to register for the draft. In 1948, he was one of four Hopis (the other were David Monongye, Dan Evehema, and Dan Katchongva) who were named by elders to communicate Hopi traditional wisdom and teachings, including the Hopi prophecies for the future, to the general public, after the atomic bombings of Hiroshima and Nagasaki in Japan.

He addressed the General Assembly of the United Nations on December 11, 1992 in celebrating the "Year of Indigenous Peoples"

Thomas Banyacya died on February 6, 1999, in Keams Canyon, Arizona. He was married to Fermina (née Jenkins).

== See also ==
- Janet McCloud
- Hibakusha
- Uranium in the environment
- Anti-nuclear movement in the United States
- The Navajo People and Uranium Mining
