= Ogema =

Ogema, derived from the Anishinaabemowin word ogimaa meaning "chief", may refer to:

- Ogema, Minnesota, a city in Becker County, Minnesota, United States
- Ogema, Wisconsin, a town in Price County, Wisconsin, United States
- Ogema (community), Wisconsin, an unincorporated community in Price County, Wisconsin, United States
- Ogema Township, Minnesota, a township in Pine County, Minnesota, United States
- Ogema, Saskatchewan, a town in Saskatchewan, Canada (named by switching the positions of the consonants in "Omega"—the town was at the end of the rail line, but another town was already called Omega)

== See also ==
- John Okemos
- Ogemaw
- Sachem, cognate word meaning "chief"
