= David Monongye =

Hopi Native American traditional leader

David Monongye was a Hopi Native American traditional leader (Kikmongwi of Hotevilla). Nephew of Yukiuma, keeper of the Fire Clan tablets, who founded Hotevilla in 1906. He is one of four Hopis (including Thomas Banyacya, Dan Evehema, and Dan Katchongva) who decided or were appointed to reveal Hopi traditional wisdom and teachings, including the Hopi prophecies for the future, to the general public in 1946, after the use of the first two nuclear weapons on Japan.

Monongye's age is uncertain. He was alive in 1906 when Oraibi split into two villages, and lived to at least 1987, and at least 117.

In 1972, Monongye and three other Hopi elders participated in the United Nations Conference on the Human Environment. Monongye was a co-author of Techqua Ikachi, the traditional Hopi newsletters produced from 1975 to 1986. Monongye inspired Godfrey Reggio's 1982 film, Koyaanisqatsi: Life Out of Balance. Monongye was vocal about problems generated by coal-mining on Hopi land.

David Monongye was a member of the Hopi Snake Clan. He was married to Nora, with whom he raised a number of children, and they lived on the Third Mesa of the Hopi Reservation. Hotevilla was considered to be a "traditional" village, because its residents resisted the interference and control of the American government in Hopi affairs.

== See also ==
- Koyaanisqatsi
