= Gwen Setalla =

Hopi ceramic artist

Gwen Setalla (born 1964) is a Hopi ceramic artist. She was born into the Setalla (Navasie) family of multi-generational Hopi potters and kachina carvers.

== Early life ==
Gwen Sharon Setalla was born of the Bear Clan with the Hopi name of Aȁs-kữ-Mana. She is from the Mishongnovi village on Second Mesa of Hopi pueblo. Her parents are Pauline and Justin Setalla who are from the Frog Woman and Feather Woman families. Setalla began making ceramics at 5 years of age, learning from her mother who also was a potter.

== Work ==
Her ceramic pots and tiles are made from clay dug in the Keams Canyon region of Arizona; the objects are then painted with a mixture of locally sourced mustard greens and powdered hematite to create permanent black designs on the surface of the clay. They are then pit fired in the traditional manner using dried sheep dung. The surface designs are informed by the patterns used on pottery shards found in the area of Awatowi village and Kawikaa village.

== Collections ==
Her work is included in the permanent collections of the Michael C. Carlos Museum, Heard Museum, the Maxwell Museum, the Peabody Museum, and the Smithsonian Institution. In 2011 the Setella family was were inducted into the Arizona Culture Keepers Hall of Fame.
