= Tuba (chief) =

Hopi leader (c. 1810–1887)

- Born: c. 1810; Oraibi, Arizona
- Died: 1887 (aged 76–77)
- Other names: Tuvi, Toova
- Citizenship: Hopi
- Known for: Headman of the Moencopi village; Hopi leader; conversion to the LDS Church

Tuba (also Tuvi or Toova; c. 1810–1887) was a Hopi leader in the late 19th century. Tuba was the headman of the small Hopi village of Moencopi, roughly fifty miles west of the main villages on the Hopi mesas. However, he apparently was an important person in the village of Oraibi as well. Eventually, Tuba joined the Church of Jesus Christ of Latter-day Saints (LDS Church) and later received his endowment in the St. George Temple. Tuba City, Arizona, was named in his honor.

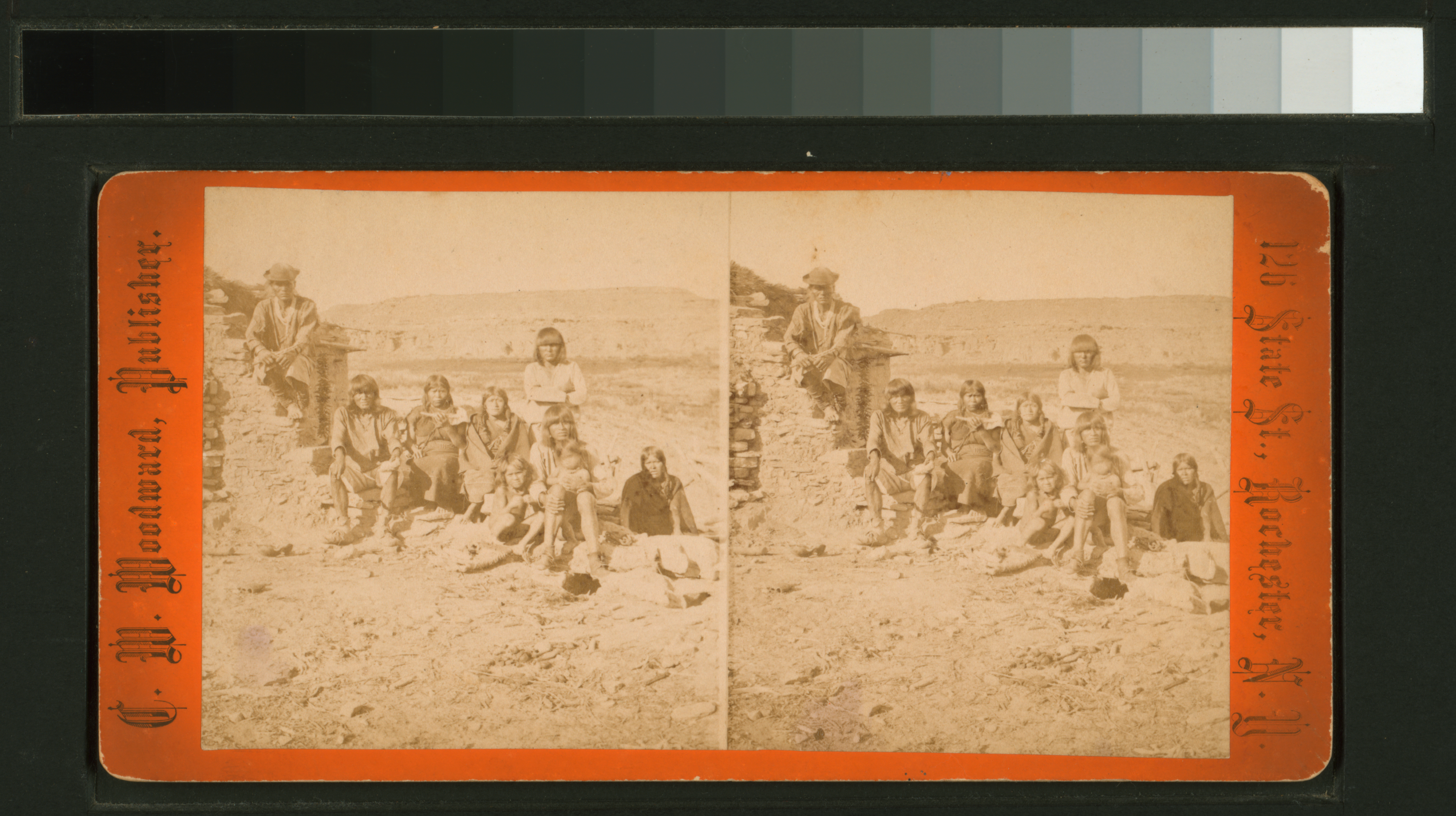
Tuba (Toova) and his band on the Moincoppee (Moenkopi)

== Early life ==
Tuba was born in Oraibi, Arizona, as a member of the Short Corn Clan, or possibly the Pumpkin Clan. Hopi tradition does not record his birth name, but he told a Mormon missionary that said his Hopi name was "Woo Pah."

Tuba related to this same missionary that during the Mexican–American War (c. 1846), the Mexicans were in full retreat from the environs of the Hopi mesas. However, as they left they caused considerable trouble for the Hopis, and in fact one tried to steal a girl from Oraibi to take south with him. Apparently, Tuba's brother challenged the Mexican interloper to a kind of duel, and the pair fought with bowie knives in the village plaza. Tuba's brother was killed, but Tuba stepped in and killed the Mexican with a spear. This story seems of doubtful historical accuracy for several reasons. Among them, the story recounts that Tuba was eighteen years old when the duel occurred although he would have been in his mid-thirties at the time of the Mexican–American War.

Whatever the case may be, Hopi tradition tells that at some point, Tuba became involved in an unremembered dissension at Oraibi, and left the village to "be at peace". From then on, "Woo Pah" was known among the Hopi as Tuuvi, meaning the outcast or the rejected one.

== Moencopi ==
Tuba settled at Moencopi, or "Running Water," about 50 miles west of Oraibi. Moencopi had played any important part in the Hopi's legendary migration cycle. By Tuba's time, the area was used as summer fields for the villagers at Oraibi due to its springs and streams. The Hopi say that at first, Tuba settled at Moencopi alone with his wife, living there all year long whereas before it had merely been a seasonal settlement. However, soon people of Tuba's Short Corn Clan followed him, and eventually members of other clans until a sizeable community was created.

Tuba told one Mormon that after he had settled at Moencopi, there came a time when the Hopis who lived with him "became lazy and wicked", refusing to "plant or tend the herds". Tuba was greatly distressed about this, and as he sat brooding, he saw an old man approach with a long white beard. The man claimed to have a message from God that the people must plant and take care of their herds or they would die in a three-year famine that was to come. Tuba then turned his head and the man disappeared. Tuba did as instructed and stored his own corn in a bin which was enough to last through the predicted famine. Purportedly, Tuba explained that a long time ago there were three men that had been left on the earth, and when the Hopi were in trouble, one would come to advise them. He believed that this stranger was one of them.

== Visit to Utah ==
The first Mormon missionaries to visit the Hopi came in 1858 under the leadership of Jacob Hamblin. It is unclear if Tuba still lived in Oraibi at this point, or if he had already moved to Moencopi. However, Hamblin writes that upon their arrival a "very aged man" (presumably not Tuba) reported a prophecy that men would come to the Hopi from the west who would bring them back blessings which they had lost and that he believed that Hamblin and the Mormons were those spoken of. Hamblin soon left, but a few Mormons stayed behind to teach the Hopi. However, these left in the middle of winter to preserve the peace after a strong contention had begun in Oraibi as to whether they were in fact those spoken of by the prophecy. It might be speculated that this contention over the Mormons is the unnamed dissension that caused Tuba to leave Oraibi and settle at Moencopi. In any event, in early 1860, Tuba became acquainted with Mormon missionaries Thales Haskel and Marion Shelton in Oraibi, and invited them to settle in Moencopi and build a wool mill. However, they returned to southern Utah. Ten years later, in November 1870, Tuba left his home with his wife, Pulaskaninki, in company with Hamblin to spend time in southern Utah in order to learn the ways of the Mormons. This was apparently in contravention of a Hopi taboo forbidding Hopis from crossing the Colorado River until three prophets which had led the Hopi to their current home returned. Upon reaching the Colorado, Hamblin recorded:

[Tuba]...looked rather sorrowful, and told me that his people once lived on the other side of this river, and their fathers had told them they never would go west of the river again to live. Said he, 'I am now going on a visit to see my friends. I have worshiped the Father of us all in the way you believe to be right; now I wish you would do as the Hopees [their name for themselves] think is right before we cross.' I assented. He then took his medicine bag from under his shirt, and offered me a little of its contents. I offered my left hand to take it; he requested me to take it in my right. He then knelt with his face to the east, and asked the Great Father of all to preserve us in crossing the river. He said that he and his wife had left many friends at home, and if they never lived to return, their friends would weep much. He prayed for pity upon his friends, the "Mormons," that none of them might drown in crossing; and that all the animals we had with us might be spared, for we needed them all, and to preserve unto us all our food and clothing, that we need not suffer hunger nor cold on our journey. He then arose to his feet. We scattered the ingredients from the medicine bag into the air, on to the land and into the water of the river...After this ceremony we drove our animals into the river, and they all swam safely to the opposite shore. In a short time ourselves and effects were safely over. Tuba then thanked the Great Father that He had heard and answered our prayer.

Tuba spent nearly a year in the company of the Mormons. He was able to meet LDS Church president, Brigham Young, in St. George, Utah. Tuba was particularly impressed by a factory where yarn was being mechanically spun. In Hopi culture, it is the men who spin the yarn for blankets, and it is spun by hand. According to Hamblin, after seeing this factory, Tuba "could never think of spinning yarn again with his fingers, to make blankets". His wife was most impressed by the Mormon grist mills, a major improvement over grinding corn by stone.

== Sacred Hopi stone ==
Although Tuba seems to have had various disagreements with village leaders in Oraibi, he apparently retained access to one of the Hopi's sacred stones. On one occasion, several Mormons were visiting Tuba in Oraibi and he took his visitors inside the village kiva. There, he produced what appeared to be a marble slab about 15×18 inches covered in "hieroglyphic" markings including clouds and stars. The later Ethnological Report No. 4 produced by the U.S. government seems to uphold the existence of such a stone based on the testimony of John W. Young and Andrew S. Gibbons. This describes the stone as made of "red-clouded marble, entirely different from anything found in the region".

== Tuba City and baptism ==
In 1873, Tuba again invited the Mormons to come and live by his village of Moencopi. This time, the offer was accepted, although a permanent Latter-day Saint presence did not become a reality until 1875. But the resultant community became the first Mormon settlement in Arizona. Hopi tradition has it that Tuba invited the Mormons to settle near his village in order to gain protection from marauding Paiutes and Navajos. Tuba was baptized into the LDS Church in 1876. In April 1877, Tuba and his wife attended the dedication of the Mormon temple in St. George, Utah, in company with missionary Andrew S. Gibbons and his wife. It was sometime during this period that Tuba shared his new faith with Tom Polacca, a headman at Hano on First Mesa, who was also eventually baptized. In September 1878, Tuba helped lay out the site for a new Mormon town near Moencopi which would be called Tuba City. Both Mormons and some Hopis moved into the new town, although other Hopi leaders objected when Tuba gave the land on which the town was situated to the Mormons. In 1879, a wool factory was built in Tuba City in order to "benefit the Indians and the [LDS] Church". No doubt this edifice reminded Tuba of the factory which had so engaged his imagination in southern Utah nine years before.

== Later life ==
The settlement of his Mormon friends at Tuba City and the completion of the factory may have been a high point in Tuba's life, for it seems his last decade was marked with sadness. The woolen factory was in operation for only a short time and within a few years it had fallen into disrepair. It is reported that Tuba "took particular pride in watching over the remains of the factory, but after his death the ruination of the building was made complete". It also seems that at some point in his last years, Tuba's wife left him for a younger man, and afterwards Tuba spent about three years living in the home of Mormon missionary Christian Lyngaa ("Lingo") Christensen. Tuba died in 1887, and at least some of Tuba's children were still living in Moencopi into the mid-twentieth century. In 1941, a sandstone marker with a bronze plaque was dedicated in Tuba City by the LDS Church in honor of Tuba.
