= Dan Evehema =

Dan Evehema (born 1893) was a Hopi Native American traditional leader. He is one of four Hopis (including Thomas Banyacya, David Monongye, and Dan Katchongva) who decided or were appointed to reveal Hopi traditional wisdom and teachings, including the Hopi prophecies for the future, to the general public in 1946, after the use of the first two nuclear weapons against Japan. Evehema died on January 6, 1999, at approximately 106 years of age. In his "final message" he stated that he was the last of the group of four fully knowledgeable Hopis still alive. Evehema was co-author, with Thomas Mails, of "Hotevilla: Hopi Shrine of the Covenant : Microcosm of the World" and "Hopi Survival Kit" and co-author of Techqua Ikachi, the traditional Hopi newsletters produced from 1975 to 1986. The "Hopi Survival Kit" includes a signed affidavit from Dan Evehema approving the book, and is the only written account of the complete Hopi prophecies. Evehema was a member of the Greasewood/Roadrunner Clan.

== Bibliography ==
- Mails, Thomas E.; Evehama, Dan (1996) Hotevilla: Hopi Shrine of the Covenant : Microcosm of the World New York: Marlowe & Company (Hardcover) ISBN 978-1-56924-835-5
- Mails, Thomas E.; Evehama, Dan (Mar 1996) Hotevilla: Hopi Shrine of the Covenant : Microcosm of the World Treasure Chest Books (Paperback) ISBN 978-1-56924-810-2
- Mails, Thomas E.; Evehema, Dan (1997) The Hopi Survival Kit ISBN 978-1-101-04266-3
