= Ogemaw =

Ogemaw, a variant spelling of ogema, is derived from the Anishinaabemowin word ogimaa meaning "chief", may refer to the following places in the U.S. state of Michigan:

- Ogemaw County, Michigan
- Ogemaw Township, Michigan

== See also ==
- John Okemos
