= Kikmongwi =

Traditional Hopi Indian Tribe village chiefs

Kikmongwi (or Kik-mongwi) are traditional village chiefs on the Hopi Reservation in Northeastern Arizona.

== Background ==
The Hopi, an Indian Tribe, effectively have two parallel systems of local government. One is a Western-style tribal government established under authority of the Hopi Tribal Constitution, with elected or appointed members who serve on a reservation-wide tribal council, and an elected tribal chairman. The other is a traditional system of civil and spiritual leadership that traces back at least 1,000 years and is organized by villages and clans within each village. Some villages that have maintained more traditional structures, are often secret and opaque to outsiders.

Kikmongwi are, in one sense, merely the Tribal chiefs of each among the villages that follows a traditional governance structure. They are hereditary leaders based on a complex system of lineage and kinship. Each clan on each village has a Mongwi, or leader, responsible for the social and religious duties of the clan, and the Kikmongwi is the male head of the dominant clan. However, Hopi is unusual among tribes in that there is a recognized interface between the two systems of government. Namely, the Constitution and the Courts delegate certain tribe-wide duties such as the police force, schools, lawmaking, and administration of the courts to the tribe as a whole, but leave many civil matters such as land use, child custody, and inheritance to the villages to decide as they wish (meaning, the Tribe asserts no authority over these aspects of traditional governance). Further, the Kikmongwi appoints the delegates from these villages to the Tribal Council.

Kikmongwi have religious duties and significance as well. Inasmuch as Hopi do not make a firm distinction between secular and religious matters with respect to issues such as agriculture, land and water use, and family relationships, the position can be considered an inherently religious one as well. Mongwi, for instance, are often depicted as Kachinas.

It is also unusual for outsiders (no family/marriage ties) to have knowledge of or participate in any religious ceremonies at any or all villages therefore, making it difficult to accurately report of the actual functions of such a system.
