= Naha (disambiguation) =

Naha is the capital city of the Japanese prefecture of Okinawa. Named after it are:

- Naha (train), a defunct sleeper train service
- Naha Air Base
- Naha Airport
- Naha City Hospital Station
- Naha City Museum of History
- Naha Civic Hall
- Roman Catholic Diocese of Naha
- Naha Port Facility
- Naha Tug-of-war

== Other places ==
- Naha, Estonia, a village
- Naha, Chiapas, a village in Mexico
- Naha-Metzabok, a biosphere reserve in Chiapas, Mexico
  - Naha Flora and Fauna Protection Area, part of Naha-Metzabok Biosphere Reserve
- Naha, Honiara, a suburb of Honiara, Solomon Islands
- Naha, Ghana, a community in the Northern Region of Ghana

== People with the surname ==
- Ed Naha (born 1950), American writer and producer
- Helen Naha (1922-1993), Hopi-Tewa potter
- Iqlas Naha (born 1994), Indian cricketer
- K. Avukader Kutty Naha (1920–1988), Indian politician and social worker
- Kshitindramohan Naha (1932-1996), Indian geologist
- Paqua Naha, Hopi-Tewa Potter
- Reshma Nilofer Naha, Indian maritime pilot
- Tyra Naha, Hopi potter

== People with the given name ==
- Naha Mint Mouknass (born 1969), Mauritian politician
- Naha Mint Seyyidi (died 2021), Mauritian journalist

== Other uses ==
- Naha (restaurant)
- Naha Stone
