= Dextra Quotskuyva =

Native American potter and artist (1928–2019)

Dextra Quotskuyva Nampeyo
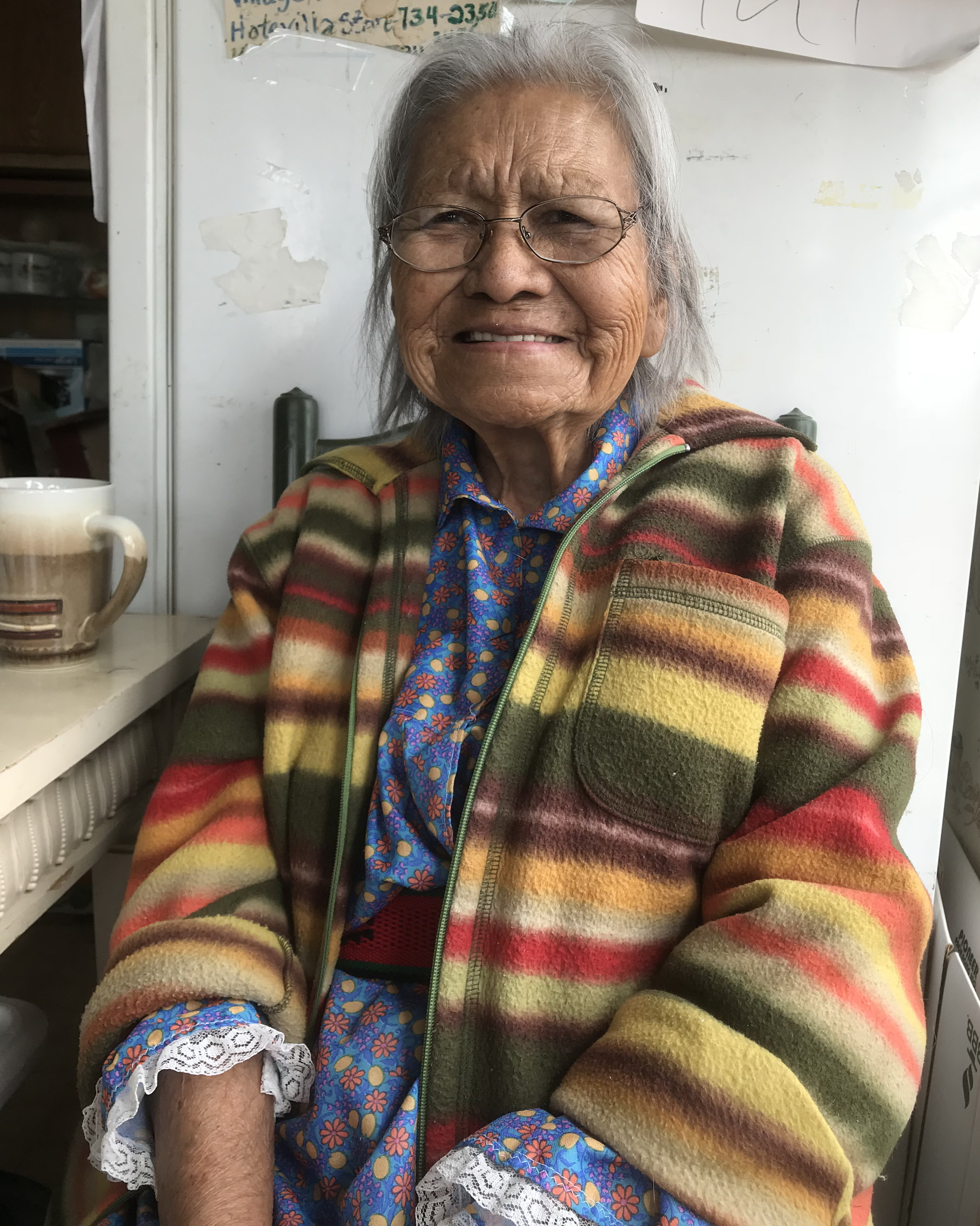
- Photo of Dextra Quotskuyva taken on September 20, 2018, in Kykotsmovi, Arizona.
- Born: September 6, 1928; Polacca, Arizona, U.S.
- Died: February 2019 (aged 90)
- Education: Great-granddaughter of Hopi–Tewa potter Nampeyo
- Known for: Potter and artist
- Awards: Proclaimed an "Arizona Living Treasure," 1994; Arizona State Museum Lifetime Achievement Award, 1998

Dextra Quotskuyva Nampeyo (September 6, 1928 – February 2019) was a Native American potter and artist. She was in the fifth generation of a distinguished ancestral line of Hopi potters.

In 1994 Dextra Quotskuyva was proclaimed an "Arizona Living Treasure," and in 1998 she received the first Arizona State Museum Lifetime Achievement Award. In 2001, the Wheelwright Museum organized a 30-year retrospective exhibition of Quotskuyva's pottery, and in 2004, she received the Southwestern Association for Indian Arts Lifetime Achievement award.

== Personal life ==
Quotskuyva was the great-granddaughter of Hopi-Tewa potter Nampeyo of Hano, who revived Sikyátki style pottery, descending through her eldest daughter, Annie Healing. Dextra is the daughter of Rachel Namingha (1903–1985), and sister of Priscilla Namingha, who are other notable Hopi-Tewa potters. Her daughter, Hisi Nampeyo is also a potter, and her son, Dan Namingha, is painter and sculptor. Her husband, Edwin Quotskuyva, was a veteran and a Hopi tribal leader.

Quotskuyva died in February 2019, at the age of 90.

== Work ==
Dextra began her artistic career in 1967, following Nampeyo's rich heritage rooted in Sikyatki decorations. At first, following the advice of her mother to stay true to the old styles, Dextra's design repertoire was limited to traditional Nampeyo migration and bird designs. After her mother died in 1985, Dextra felt at greater liberty to express her personal creativity. She was the first Nampeyo potter to produce a commodity for public consumption.

Quotskuyva experiments with the traditional materials usually used for pottery, gathering clay from different sources from her reservation and creating variations on the characteristic orange, tan, and brown hues of Hopi bonfire pots. For the decorations, she uses bee-weed plant for the black and native clay slips for the red.

In describing her way of creating pottery, she said: "One day my pottery calls for me, and then I know this is the day I must do it".

Noted American Indian art dealer and collector, Martha Hopkins Lanman Struever, authored a book about Dextra entitled "Painted Perfection", exploring a collection of her works which were exhibited at the Wheelwright Museum of the American Indian.

== See also ==
- Fannie Nampeyo, potter, daughter of Nampeyo
- Elva Nampeyo (1926–1985), potter, Dextra's aunt.
- Dan Namingha, her son, artist and sculptor
- Martha Hopkins Struever, American Indian art dealer and Quotskuyva's biographer.

== Selected public collections ==
- Lowell D. Holmes Museum of Anthropology, Wichita State University
- Minneapolis Institute of Art
- Nelson Atkins Museum of Art
- National Museum of the American Indian
- Museum of Texas Tech University, Texas Tech University, Lubbock, TX.
