= Daisy Hooee =

20th-century artist

Daisy Hooee Nampeyo
- Born: 1906 or 1910
- Died: 1994 or 1998
- Education: École des Beaux-Arts
- Known for: Pottery
- Relatives: Nampeyo (grandmother); Raymond Naha (son)
- Patrons: Anita Baldwin

Daisy Hooee Nampeyo (1906 or 1910 – 1994 or 1998) was a Hopi-Tewa potter. She studied at École des Beaux-Arts. Hooee taught pottery making on the Zuni reservation and helped preserve the traditional techniques she learned from her grandmother, Nampeyo.

== Biography ==
Hooee was a Hopi-Tewa potter and was born in 1906 or 1910. Hooee grew up in Hano, First Mesa, Arizona. She was a granddaughter of Nampeyo and the daughter of Nampeyo's daughter, Annie Healing. She learned to paint pottery from her grandmother before she was ten years old.

Hooee discovered that she had cataracts and might go blind around age ten while she was attending Phoenix Indian School. Anita Baldwin, an arts patron, provided surgery for Hooee in California and then went on to give her a formal education. Baldwin took her to school in Paris, where she studied at the École des Beaux-Arts, and showed her around the world. Hooee lived with Baldwin for around ten years. Hooee returned to the Hopi community when her mother, Annie Healing, began to have health issues. She settled in Polacca, Arizona, where she worked as a cook in a school.

In the 1920s, Hooee worked with the Zuni and formed a dancing and singing group, the Olla Maidens, which as a group continue to perform today. Her son, Raymond Naha, who also became an artist, was born in Polacca in 1930 and died in 1975. Hooee married her first husband, Ray Naha, in 1935. Around that time, she worked with archaeologists from the Peabody Museum on the Awatovi excavation. She later divorced Naha, and moved to Zuni, where she married Leo Poblano, a silversmith, in 1938. Poblano died fighting the Woodwardia forest fire in the Angeles National Forest in California in 1959. Later, she married another silversmith, Sidney Hooee (1915–1998). Hooee died either in 1994 or 1998.

A biography about her life, Daisy Hooee Nampeyo (ISBN 978-0875181417) was written in 1977. She is also featured in a 1981 documentary, The Pueblo Presence, by Hugh and Suzanne Johnston and produced by WNET.

== Work ==
Hooee's work has several influences. She was trained to create pottery by her grandmother, Nampeyo, and her earlier work reflects that style which is based on the Sikyatki. Hooee was also influenced by the style of pots excavated at Awatovi. She also had Zuni influences in her work, using white clay and a particular "high shouldered water jar form." Hooee's pottery is created using clay mined locally. Her work was polychrome. Work is fired in ovens using sheep dung as fuel, or coal when available. Hooee signed her work "Nampeyo."

For a short period, Hooee created sculpture and did some work with relief settings and silversmithing. She and her husband, Leo Poblano, a silversmith, introduced the relief work to the Zuni people. Hooee also taught pottery at Zuni High School. In the mid 1970s, she worked on the Zuni Pottery Project where she taught Zuni potters how to make traditional pots. It was important to Hooee that the craft of making pottery through traditional methods did not die out. She also lectured and did demonstrations of her work, with one museum, the Honolulu Academy of Arts (now Honolulu Museum of Art), importing 400 pounds of sheep dung for the pottery oven during her appearance in 1974.

Hooee has work in the collection of the Smithsonian American Art Museum.
