= Paqua Naha =

Hopi-Tewa potter (c. 1890–1955)

Paqua Naha (c. 1890–1955), also known as "Frog Woman", was a Hopi-Tewa potter. She worked in the "black-and-red on yellow" style of pottery, which Nampeyo popularized as Sikyátki revival ware. She became well known as a potter by the 1920s and started using a frog hallmark to sign her works. Late in her career, she experimented with white slips and innovated a whiteware technique. Naha was the matriarch of the Naha/Navasie family, and several of her descendants went on to become notable potters in their own right, including Joy Navasie and Helen Naha. Her works are included in the collections of the National Museum of the American Indian, the Museum of Northern Arizona, and the Heard Museum.

== Early life and family ==
Paqua Naha was born around 1890 into the Kachina/Cottonwood clan. She was among several women of Hano who were potters. Her name, Paqua, means frog in Hopi and she later became known as "Frog Woman".

== Pottery career ==
Naha's pottery was preceded by the success of fellow Hopi-Tewa potter Nampeyo, whose Sikyátki revival ware used a black-and-red on yellow scheme. Naha became a respected potter by the 1920s. For much of her career, her pieces were often yellow or beige, and very occasionally she made redware. She worked in the "black-and-red on yellow" style, using yellow unslipped pottery with black and white designs. She was known for making complicated pots, including ollas and low seed jars. Naha started using a frog symbol to sign her works, probably by 1925. In 1931, she participated in the second annual Hopi Craftsman Exhibition.

Towards the end of her career, around 1951 or 1952, she started experimenting with white slips, innovating polychrome whiteware.

Naha is the matriarch of the Naha/Navasie family, which has produced a number of notable potters. Many of her descendants adopted her whiteware pottery technique and her frog hallmark. Her daughter Joy Navasie used a flower mark before switching to her mother's frog mark. Naha's frog hallmark can be differentiated from that of her daughter, as Joy's frog has webbed feet and Paqua's has long, straight-lined toes. Naha's son Archie married Helen Naha, who became known as "Feather Woman" for her use of a feather glyph.

Naha's works are included in the collections of the National Museum of the American Indian, the Museum of Northern Arizona, and the Heard Museum.
