= Hopi Cultural Center =

Organization in Mesa, United States

The Hopi Cultural Center

- Location in Arizona

General information
- Location: AZ-264, Second Mesa, Arizona 86043
- Coordinates: 35.79323°N 110.64523°W
- Opened: 1971

Website
- https://hopiculturalcenter.com

The Hopi Cultural Center is a place in the Hopi Reservation on Second Mesa, Arizona where visitors can learn about the culture, history and art of the Hopi people. It also provides lodging and a restaurant that serves Hopi cuisine. A museum is also part of the cultural center. Hopi ceremonies also take place at the center, although many of these are not open to the public.

== About ==
The Hopi Cultural Center is located in Second Mesa, Arizona. The center has lodging, a gift shop selling arts and crafts made by local Hopi artisans, a restaurant featuring Hopi cuisine and a museum.

The motel is based on traditional Hopi architecture and features a "stucco maze with outdoor walkways and balconies outside second-floor rooms." Currently, there are 33 guest rooms and the motel includes meeting rooms for conferences.

Cultural programs are hosted at the center. Some of these include "hands-on" activities, such as Planting Day, where participants learn about Hopi farming. The Hopi Cultural Center also hosts Hopi snake dances, although these are closed to the public. Some Katsina dances are open to the public, but these do not allow any type of visual or audio recording of the ceremonies.

=== Museum ===
The Hopi Cultural Center Museum contains objects of Hopi art and craftsmanship, including kachinas, weaving and pottery. Historic artifacts such as documents and photographs are also part of the collection.

The museum originally opened with objects on loan from the Museum of Northern Arizona.

Notable individuals who have shown work or have items in the collection include Michael Kabotie, and Priscilla Namingha.

== History ==
Hopi artist, Fred Kobotie, wanted to bring Hopi culture and art back to the Hopi Reservation. In 1965, he began to plan the cultural center and, along with several sponsors, set up the Hopi Cultural Center, Inc. as a nonprofit entity. Together, the Hopi tribe applied to the Economic Development Administration (EDA) for financing in 1968. The new building was dedicated on June 26, 1971. Governor Jack Williams spoke at the dedication. In 1973 Hopi artists Michael Kabotie, Terrance Talasawaima, and Neil David Sr. formed the Artist Hopid. Joined by Delbridge Honanie and Milland Lomakema they opened a shop and studio in the Hopi Cultural Center mall. The group’s objectives included: researching and documenting Hopi history through visual arts for posterity and educating Hopi and non-Hopi about the cultural values of the Hopi Their work was well received and as a result the Artist Hopid were given a grant from the National Endowment for the Arts and the Arizona Commission on the Arts and Humanities. The museum of the cultural center received a $10,000 grant from the Weatherhead Foundation for display cabinets. The cabinets were based on a similar design used at the Museum of Northern Arizona. The first curator was Terrance Talaswaima. Anna Silas was the director of the museum in the 1990s and worked as curator for nearly forty years.

The restaurant was remodeled in the early 1980s.
