= Namingha =

Namingha is a surname. Notable people with the surname include:

- Dan Namingha (born 1950), Native American painter and sculptor
- Priscilla Namingha (1924–2008), Native American potter
