= Frog Woman =

Frog Woman may refer to:

- Paqua Naha (c. 1890–1955), Hopi-Tewa potter
- Joy Navasie, (1919–2012), Hopi-Tewa potter and daughter of Paqua Naha

== See also ==
- Frog Woman Rock
- Frogman
- Frogman (disambiguation)
