= Alexander MacGregor Stephen =

- Born: circa 1850; Scotland
- Died: 1894

Alexander MacGregor Stephen was a Scottish-American amateur ethnographer. A miner who emigrated from Scotland to the United States, he spent time with the Hopi of First Mesa and Navajo observing their daily lives.

== Biography ==
Alexander M. Stephen was born in Scotland around 1850 and immigrated to the United States sometime before October 1861. He attended the University of Edinburgh where we became trained in metallurgy. Stephen died in April 1894. During the American Civil War, Stephen joined the New York Militia from 1861–1866.

After the war, Stephen spent time observing and recording the lives of the Hopi Indians that lived in the First Mesa in what is now Arizona. During the period of 1880–1894, he either lived with the Hopi or if he lived with friend and local trading post owner, Thomas V Keam. In 1894, while living with the Hopi, Stephen came down with influenza which caused his death. Afterword, a monument was created and placed in Keam's Canyon as a way to honor him and his work.

== Life with the Hopi ==
Stephen's first recording of the Hopi was in 1882. During his time there, he observed all aspects of Hopi life including focuses on language, culture, and family fife. Folklore, legends and ceremonies were also observed. Learning the Navajo language, Stephen held a seemingly positive relationship with the Hopi. Stephen was in good enough terms with them to have been inducted into three of their different societies. First, the Flute of the First Mesa, second, the Lalakon of the First Mesa, and third, the Snake of Shipau'lovi. Through his initiations into the Lalakon and Snake of the Shipau'lovi, he was given the names Ripe Corn and Sunrise. Through his ethnographic studies, Stephen prioritized the use of Native terms and used what he considered unbiased language.

== Written works ==
- Hopi Journal of Alexander M Stephen (2 volumes; New York: Columbia University Press, 1936)
- The Navajo Shoemaker (published in the "Proceedings of the United States National Museum", Vol 11, 1889)
- Pottery of Tusayan (Catalogue of the Keam Collection, unpublished manuscript dated December 29, 1890. Used for "Hopi Pottery Symbols" by Alex Patterson, 1994)
- Hopi Indians of Arizona (Los Angeles, Ca, Southwest Museum, 1940)
- Notes about the Navajos (Published in "Canadian Indian", vol 1 1890)
- Notes on Marriage among the Navajos, Navajo Dress, and Navajo Dwellings (published in Our forest children, v. 3 (1890))
- Legend of the Snake Order of the Moquis: As Told by Outsiders (published in Journal of American Folklore, 1888)
