= Dan Namingha =

Hopi painter and sculptor (b. 1950)

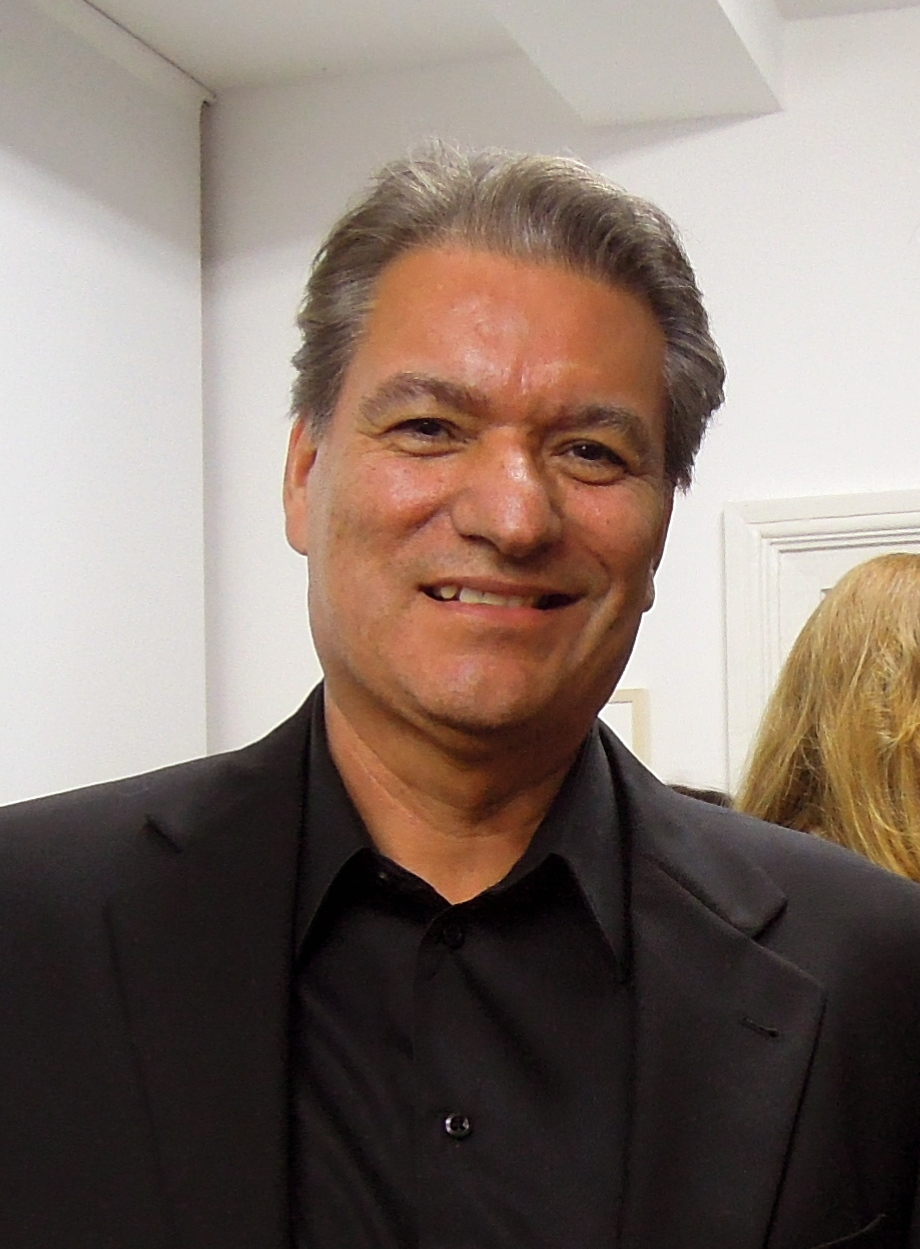
Portrait of Namingha in 2012

Dan Namingha (born 1950) is a Hopi painter and sculptor. He is Dextra Quotskuyva's son, and a great-great-grandson of Nampeyo. He is a member of the Hopi-Tewa group of the Hopi Tribe. He lives in Santa Fe, New Mexico.

== Early life and education ==
Namingha was born in Keams Canyon, Arizona, and grew up with his mother on his grandparents' ranch in Polacca on the Hopi Reservation. As a child he would draw with coal while using grocery boxes as a canvas. In elementary school, Namingha would arrive early to create in a makeshift studio a teacher had created after noticing a lot of the Hopi and Tewa children had an interest in art. In high school, Namingha attended a University of Kansas summer art program. He also studied at the Institute of American Indian Arts and the School of the Art Institute of Chicago.

== Style ==
Dan Namingha has been showing professionally as an artist for 40 years. His heritage inspires his work, which explores connections between the physical and the spirit world and includes Hopi symbolism.

Drawing and painting was a natural part of Hopi childhood. It gave him a way to express his strong feelings about the culture and environment leading to a path of creative freedom. Dan feels that change and evolution are a continuum; socially, politically, spiritually and that the future of our planet and membership of the human race must be monitored to insure survival in the spirit of cultural and technology diversity. He says that only then can we merge the positive and negative polarization and balance so necessary to communal spirit of the universe.

Dan Namingha's artworks are in the collections of the Museum of Northern Arizona, the Fogg Art Museum of Harvard University, the Smithsonian Institution, the Sundance Institute, the Wheelwright Museum, the New Mexico Museum of Art, the Heard Museum, and numerous foreign museums, including the British Royal Collection in London.

== Recognition ==
In 2009, the Institute of American Indian Arts awarded him an honorary doctorate and in 2016, the Museum of Indian Arts and Culture named Namingha its 2016 "Living Treasure."

Namingha's work was part of Stretching the Canvas: Eight Decades of Native Painting (2019–21), a survey at the National Museum of the American Indian George Gustav Heye Center in New York.

== Family ==
His son Arlo Namingha is also a well-known sculptor, and his younger son Michael Namingha works in digital art. All three artists exhibit at the Namingha's Santa Fe gallery, Niman Fine Art.

== Education ==
- University of Kansas, Lawrence, Kansas
- Institute of American Indian Arts, Santa Fe, New Mexico
- Art Institute of Chicago, Chicago, Illinois

== Publications ==
- The Art of Dan Namingha by Thomas Hoving, Abrams Publishing, New York
