= Frogman (disambiguation) =

A frogman is a popular term for a scuba diver, particularly in military and other combat-type operations.

Frogman may also refer to

== In diving ==
- Frogman Corps (Denmark), from the Royal Danish Navy
- Russian commando frogmen, from the Russian Navy
- French commando frogmen, from the French Navy
- British commando frogmen, from the Royal Navy
- Casio G-Shock Frogman, a model of wristwatch by Casio
- a tradename used by Siebe Gorman for a brand of diver's drysuit in the 1960s and perhaps earlier
- a tradename used by Spearfisherman (company) for a brand of diver's drysuit made in 1945 and perhaps earlier

== Fiction ==
- The Frogmen (1951 film), a 1951 movie about World War II United States Underwater Demolition Teams
- Frogman (Oz character), a man-size talking frog in The Wonderful Wizard of Oz series
- In the Marvel Comics universe:
  - Frog-Man, a superhero associated with Spider-Man
  - Frog-Man (Ani-Men), a supervillain
  - Leap-Frog (comics), also known as Frog-Man, a supervillain
- frog-like monsters made out of men in the Hellboy comic by Mike Mignola; Ogdru Jahad § The role of the "Frog Monsters"
- Frogman Comics, a comic book that ran from Jan 1952 to May 1953, published by Hillman Periodicals
- "Frogman" (ThunderCats), a 1989 television episode
- Frogman (also Tongue Man), a villain in the 2013 Indian film Krrish 3
- Frogmen, an unaired TV-movie starring O.J. Simpson
- Frogman, a horror film based on the legend of the Loveland frog, was released in 2024.

== Other uses ==
- Clarence "Frogman" Henry (born 1937, died 2024), American musical artist
- An amphibian humanoid
- A night soil collector

== See also ==
- Froggy (disambiguation)
- Frog Woman (disambiguation)
- Toadman (disambiguation)
