= Neil David Sr. =

Native American artist

Neil David
- Born: June 4, 1944 (age 82); Polacca, Arizona, U.S.
- Died: Polacca, AZ 10/21/2026
- Citizenship: Hopi Tribe
- Known for: Katsina carving
- Spouse: Lena Charlie

Neil Randall David Sr. is an American artist and katsina carver. He learned the basics of carving from his grandfather Victor (Kawayo) Charlie.

== Early life ==
David was born June 4, 1944, on the Hopi Reservation in Polacca, Arizona. His father died before David was six years old.

Under the influence and guidance of Victor Charlie, a katsina carver, and his wife, a potter, Lena (Blue Corn) Charlie, David's interest in art was stimulated at an early age. His grandparents were invited to exhibit their art at the Santa Fe Indian Village pavilion at the Railroad Fair in Chicago in 1948. The following year they brought their grandson, 5 ½ year old David, along with them. David was self-taught as an artist. His art teacher in eighth grade was Fred Kabotie. After graduation, David attended High school in distant Phoenix. He sold his first Kachina doll while a high school freshman to Byron Hunter, who managed the trading store in Polacca. He saw the young man's talent in art and, as his mentor, encouraged him. Hunter bought many of David's drawings, paintings, and Kachina carvings and sold them through McGee's trading store.

== Career ==
David was drafted into the US Army in 1965 and served in Germany until 1968. When he returned home, he began painting and carving full time. David received national recognition when his paintings and Kachina doll carvings were given multiple page coverage in the Arizona Highways magazine of June 1971, a reference issue devoted entirely to the Kachinas, the Living Spirits of the Hopi. A group of Hopi artists, the Artist Hopid, was organized in 1972 by Michael Kabotie, Terrance Talaswayma, and Neil David Sr. Their objectives included the use of their artistic talents to instill pride and identity in the Hopi, to educate Indian and non-Indian to the cultural values of the Hopi, and document Hopi history and events through the visual arts. In 1974 and 1975, the expanded membership of six exhibited at the Heard Museum in Phoenix; the Tucson Art Center; the Riverside Community College in Riverside, California; the Museum of Man in San Diego; the Taylor Art Museum in Colorado Springs; and the Flagstaff Art Museum. In 1976 the National Endowment for the Arts and the Arizona Commission on the Arts provided a grant sending thirty-one of the group's paintings on a tour across the country. Patricia Broder's Hopi Painting includes biographical essays of the Artist Hopid and details their exhibits and achievements.

David's inseparable commingling of art and dedication to his Hopi culture gives a rare opportunity to view elements of Hopi life without intruding on the society itself. His insight into his culture, and ability to capture realistic views of Hopi life, ceremonies, and dramatic Kachina dances on canvas and with his Kachina doll carvings have brought him wide acclaim and support for calling him "the Hopis' Norman Rockwell." David's informative paintings range from the Hopis' Kachina Fest Parade, a depiction of a great variety of Kachinas parading through the village to the Hopis' Comanche Dance centering on Comanche Warrior impersonators and the Koshare, to the non-Kachina Hopi Scalp Dancers. David is internationally recognized for his drawings and carvings of his icon the Koshare, (Tewa or Hano) clown. He speaks through the antics of his clown drawings, and is associated with the Koshare to a level summarized in a telephone conversation between author Zena Pearlstone and Neil David and published in the "About Face" book as part of plate 48: "I along with my patrons see me as associated—even infatuated—with this clown [Koshare], which is the subject of so much of my work." Two of David's paintings were selected for the "About Face: Self-portraits by Native American, First Nations, and Inuit Artists" exhibit held at the Wheelwright Museum in Santa Fe, New Mexico which was held from November 2005 through April 2006. Both paintings feature his signature piece, the Koshare as central to the topic along with David. The authors/guest curators of the exhibit and publications closing comments were: "the thought-provoking Hopi Triple Self-Portrait, by artist Neil David Sr., which, we have come to think of as the signature image for this project, so many avenues does it explore." David lives and continues to create his painting and carving on the Hopi Reservation in Polacca on First Mesa, Arizona.

Neil David's Triple Self-Portrait (a spoof of "Triple Self-Portrait" by Norman Rockwell)

== Illustrations ==
The original set of 79 paintings by Neil David, on which the book Kachinas, Spirit Beings of the Hopi is based, are now in the collection of Dr. Yasutada Kashiwago, Founder of the Kashiwagi Museum in Tateshina, Nagano, Japan.

David produced all the illustrations in Eric Bromberg's book The Hopi Approach to the Art of Kachina Doll Carvings. Neil David's Hopi World published by Schiffer Publishing Ltd., is a collection of over 40 of Neil David's pen and ink drawings of his interpretation of Hopi history and culture.

== Recognition ==
David was awarded the Arizona Indian Living Treasures AILTA award in 2005. AILTA honors the lifetime achievements of Arizona American Indians.

In November 2013 David was invited to present a series of talks and exhibit his work in Germany. This included visits to the Linden Museum in Stuttgart, the Freiberg Natural History Museum, and Galerie Kokopelli in Mönchengladbach. A documentary film titled: Neil David Sr., A Smiling Hopi, was shown at the Fifth Annual Indian Inuit; North American Native Film Festival which took place in Stuttgart, Germany January 2014. The festival was organized by UNICEF, American Indian Film Institute and Festival in San Francisco, and Dreamspeakers International Indigenous Film Festival Edmonton, Canada.

== Published work ==
- Kachinas: Spirit Beings of the Hopi. University of New Mexico Press. August 1, 2006. ISBN 978-0-936755-53-3.
- Pecina, Ron; David, Neil; Pecina, Bob (January 1, 2011). Neil David's Hopi World. Schiffer Pub. Limited. ISBN 978-0-7643-3808-3.
