= Kabotie =

Kabotie is a surname. Notable people with the surname include:

- Fred Kabotie (c. 1900–1986), American Hopi painter, silversmith, illustrator, potter, author, curator and educator
- Michael Kabotie (1942–2009), American Hopi silversmith, painter, sculptor, and poet
