= Helen Naha =

Native American artist (1922–1993)

- Helen Naha in her home decorating a pot in her Awatovi Star pattern
- Born: 1922; Polacca, Arizona
- Died: 1993 (aged 70–71)
- Known for: Pottery
- Spouse: Archie Naha

Helen Naha (1922–1993) was the matriarch in a family of well known Hopi-Tewa potters.

== Biography ==
Helen Naha was the daughter-in-law of Paqua Naha (the first Frog Woman). Helen was married to Paqua's son Archie. She was mostly self-taught, following the style of her mother-in-law and sister-in-law Joy Navasie (second Frog Woman). Her designs are often based on fragments found at the Awatovi ruins near Hopi. Her hallmark style was finely polished, hand-coiled pottery finished in white slip with black and red decorations. She would often take the extra step to polish the inside of a piece as well as the outside.

She signed her pottery with a feather glyph. This resulted in her being called "Feather Woman" by many collectors. Both of her daughters, Sylvia and Rainy (Rainell), as well as her granddaughter Tyra Naha are well known potters. Today, her medium to larger pots typically sell for several thousand dollars. She has been recognized by the Southwestern Association for Indian Arts for her body of work through the creation of the Helen Naha Memorial Award - For Excellence in Traditional Hopi Pottery.

Naha was a member of the Church of Jesus Christ of Latter-day Saints.

== See also ==
- Potter Tyra Naha, her granddaughter
