= Priscilla Namingha =

Hopi-Tewa potter

Priscilla Namingha Nampeyo
- Born: 1924
- Died: 2008 (aged 83–84)
- Known for: Pottery

Priscilla Namingha Nampeyo (1924 - 2008) was a Hopi-Tewa potter who was known for her traditional pottery. Namingha mined her own clay and created her own pigments for her large pots. Her work is in the collection of several museums and cultural centers.

== Early life ==
Priscilla Namingha was born in 1924, was Hopi-Tewa and lived in Polacca, First Mesa. Namingha was the oldest daughter of Rachel Namingha and sister of Dextra Quotskuyva, Lillian Gonzales and Elenor Lucas, all of whom were potters. She is a great-granddaughter of potter, Nampeyo. Priscilla Namingha's daughters also went on to become potters. Namingha stated that she learned to create pottery by watching her mother work. As a girl, she also learned pottery techniques from Nampeyo. Namingha kept making pottery almost up to her death in 2008.

== Work ==
Namingha's work is part of the Nampeyo family tradition of pottery making. Her pottery uses "fine-line" decorations and incorporates patterns based on birds and feathers. Namingha used about 20 of the traditional designs created by Nampeyo. The traditional meanings of the designs however, had been lost by the time Namingha's mother was incorporating these patterns and symbols. Her pots are large, often around 20 inches or more in diameter.

Namnigha used clay mined from the First Mesa and processed it by grinding the hard clay and adding ground sandstone to the mixture. Black paint for the decorations is made from the Rocky Mountain bee plant and yellow rock for the reddish color in the designs. She painted with a yucca brush.

She fired her pottery in the ground, first burning wood into charcoal and then laying around 8 to 10 pots on top of the coal and added sheep dung. Between the pots, she placed pot shards and rocks, for air circulation, and then more sheep dung on top. Then the pots would smolder in the fire pit for several hours.

Namingha has done pottery demonstrations and shown her work at the Maxwell Museum of Anthropology. She also has work in the collections of the Morgan Collection of Southwest Pueblo Pottery, the Heard Museum, the Hopi Cultural Center Museum, and the Museum of Northern Arizona.
