= Fannie Nampeyo =

Native American artist (1900–1987)

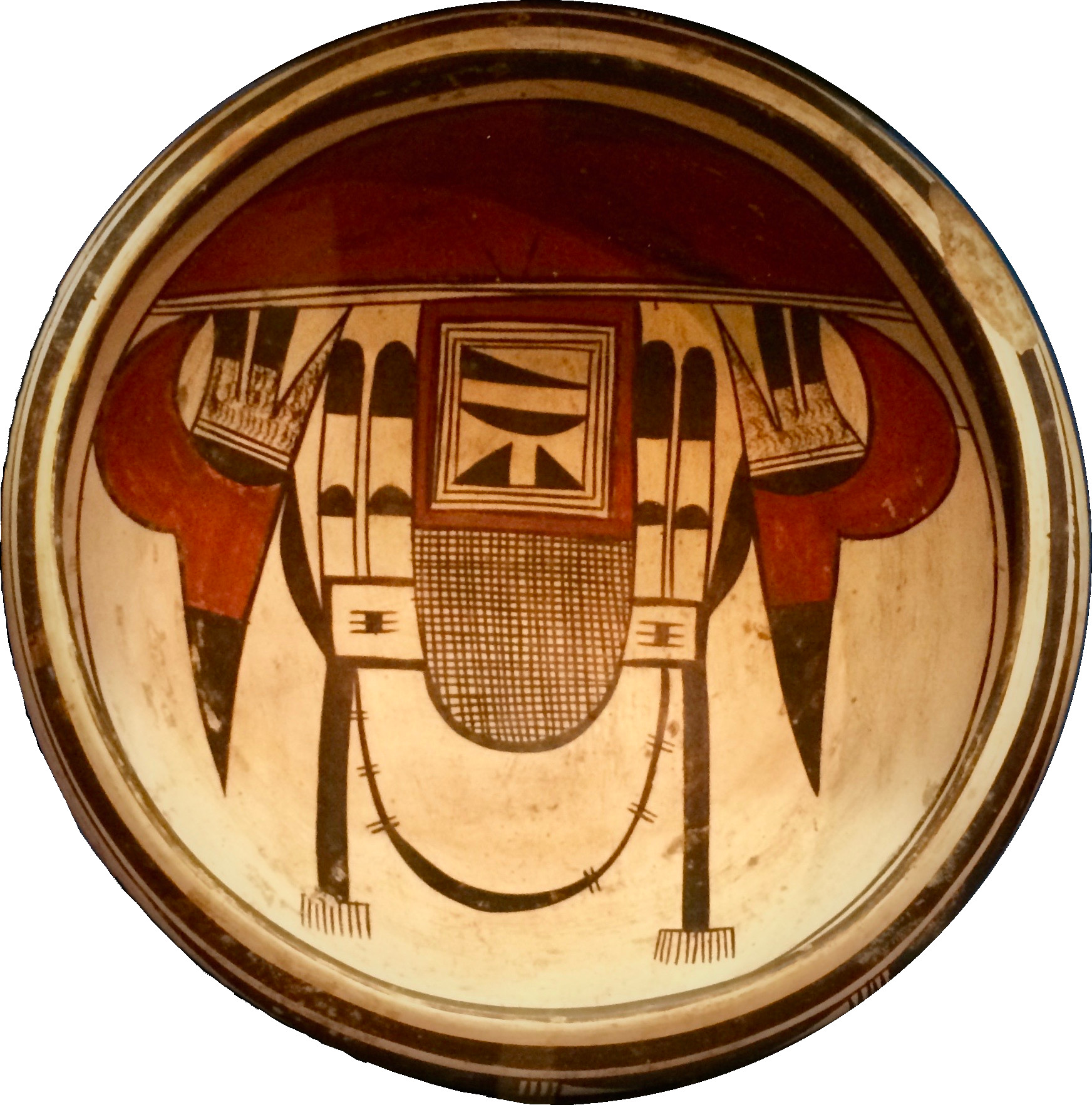
Nampeyo, two birds design. Late pot, probably painted by Fannie circa 1920s. Woolaroc collection.

Fannie Nampeyo (1900–1987) (also known as Fannie Lesou Polacca and Fannie Nampeyo Polacca) was a modern and contemporary fine arts potter, who carried on the traditions of her famous mother, Nampeyo of Hano, the grand matriarch of modern Hopi pottery.

== Biography ==
=== Early life ===
Fannie Nampeyo Polacca was the youngest of Nampeyo of Hano's three daughters. She was born in the Hopi-Tewa Corn Clan home atop First Mesa, on the Hopi Reservation in Arizona. Fannie was initially given the name Popongua or Popong-Mana (meaning "Picking Piñons") by the older women of her father Lesou's family, and either missionaries or health-care workers later gave her the name "Fannie."

The highest level of education Fannie Nampeyo completed was third grade. In the early 1920s she married her cousin, Vinton Polacca, going against tradition of marrying outside the Corn Clan. Shortly thereafter pottery making became an important part of Fannie's life. The couple moved to Sand Hills where Vinton worked a cattle ranch. There she began taking pottery seriously. From 1934 to 1937 they lived and worked as ranchers but left ranching so Vinton could work in government schools. The couple took their family to Keams Canyon, where all their children eventually completed high school. While in Keams Canyon, Polacca had a profitable tamale business. During this time, Fannie Nampeyo increasingly worked with her mother Nampeyo, whose eyesight was diminishing due to trachoma. Fannie helped her mother with pottery painting and decorating, and also assisted her father with polishing. Early works created by Fannie and her mother were signed simply "Nampeyo" by Fannie, since Nampeyo could not read or write, but later they began signing pieces made together as "Nampeyo Fannie". Pieces made by Fannie alone were signed "Fannie Nampeyo" and might include a corn symbol drawn in.

=== Pottery ===
Fannie was a prolific potter from 1920 to 1987 and earned a reputation as an outstanding potter during her lifetime. Her styles included black and red on yellow and black on yellow in the form of jars, cups and saucers. She also made miniatures and bird effigy bowls. Among her favorite designs were clouds, rain, feathers, stars and migrations motifs. In addition to making pottery she also made quilts.

Fannie's pottery won a first place blue ribbon in the "Hopi Show" at the Museum of Northern Arizona in July 1961, and her works have been included in collects by the University of Oklahoma's Fred Jones Jr. Museum of Art and The Cleveland Museum of Art.

=== Later years ===
Nampeyo became matriarch of the Hopi-Tewa Corn Clan, as her mother Nampeyo had been before her. "Nampeyo" is actually the ceremonial title used by the matriarch of the Hopi-Tewa Corn Clan. Fannie and her husband Vinton were among the first families at First Mesa to join the Church of Jesus Christ of Latter-day Saints. Fannie had 13 children, although five died shortly after birth. The other seven (Thomas Polacca, Elva Nampeyo, Tonita, Iris Youvella, Leah, Harold and Elsworth) all excelled at pottery making, which they learned from their mother, and several have become known in their own right among collectors of Native American pottery. Fannie Nampeyo Polacca died in 1987.

== See also ==
- Sikyátki
- Hopi-Tewa
- Puebloans
- First Mesa
- Art of the American Southwest
- Tewa
- Nampeyo, potter, mother of Fannie Nampeyo Polacca
- Elva Nampeyo, potter, daughter of Fannie Nampeyo Polacca
