= Elva Nampeyo =

American potter (1926–1985)

- Born: 1926; First Mesa, Arizona
- Died: 1985 (aged 58–59)
- Known for: Pottery
- Spouse: Richard Tewaguna

Elva Nampeyo (1926–1985) (also known as Elva Tewaguna) was an American studio potter.

== Biography ==
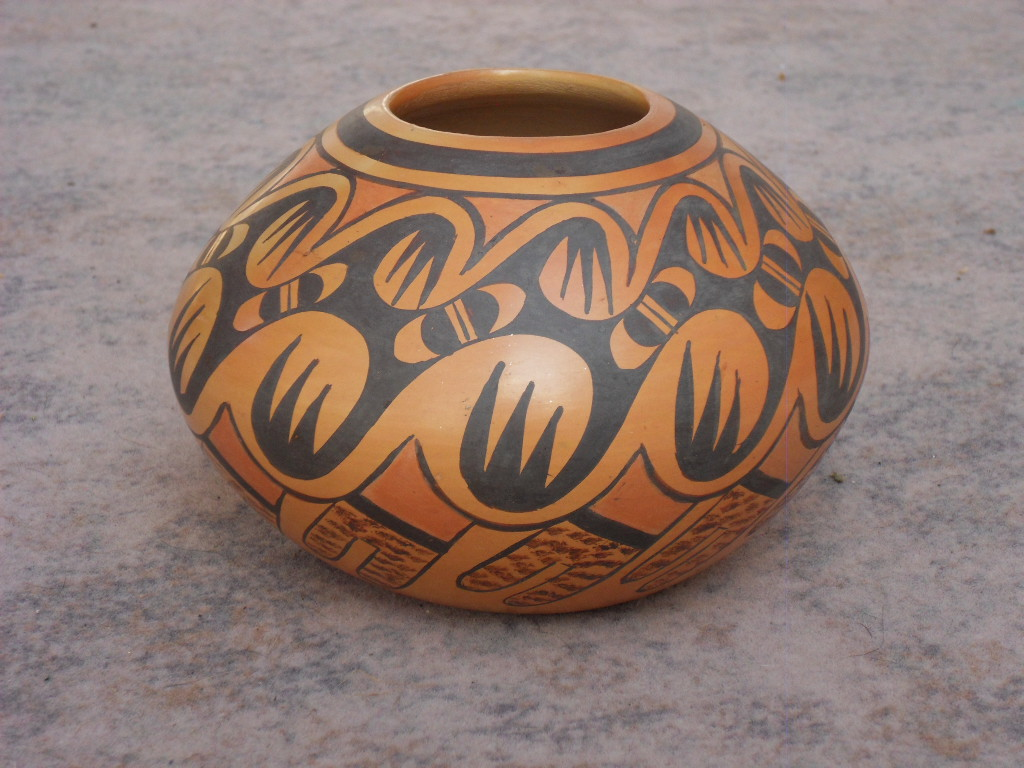
Migration pattern seed pot by Elva Nampeyo, c.1976

Elva Nampeyo was born 1926 in the Hopi-Tewa Corn Clan atop Hopi First Mesa, Arizona. Her parents were Fannie Nampeyo and Vinton Polacca. Her grandmother Nampeyo had led a revival of ancient traditional pottery and established a family tradition of pottery making. As a child Elva would watch her grandmother make pottery and later her mother taught Elva and her siblings the craft of pottery making.

Nampeyo went on to marry Richard Tewaguna and had five children, four of whom, Neva, Elton, Miriam and Adelle followed in the family pottery making tradition. All sign their work with their first names followed by "Nampeyo" and an ear of corn.

Nampeyo became an expert at decorating and painting pottery. She specialized in black and red on yellow bowls and jars with traditional migration designs and eagle motifs. Her pieces most often resembled the works of her mother and grandmother. On occasion she could be persuaded to break from tradition and try some designs of her own invention. Elva took great pleasure in making pottery and could form as many as eight pots a day. During her later years, her daughter Adelle would assist her in polishing, decorating and firing her pottery. Nampeyo signed her pottery as "Elva Nampeyo" followed by the corn clan symbol which was initiated by her mother Fannie.
