= Toadman (disambiguation) =

A toadman an element in the folklore of the Fens.

Toadman, toad man or toad men may also refer to:

- Enad Global 7, a video game company known formerly as Toadman Interactive
  - Toadman Studios, a subsidiary of Enad Global 7
- Toad Man, a Mega Man character
- The Tribbitites, an alien race in Marvel Comics commonly called Toad Men

== See also ==
- Toad (disambiguation)
- Frogman (disambiguation)
