= Nampeyo =

Hopi-Tewa potter (1859–1942)

- Num-pa-yu (Tewa: snake that does not bite)
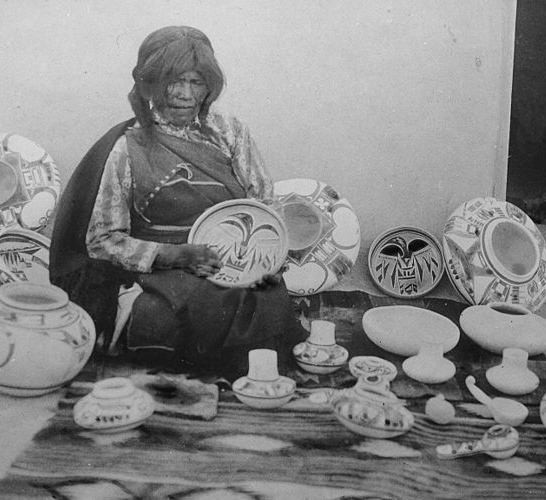
- Nampeyo, ca. 1900, photograph by A.C. Vroman
- Born: 1859; Hano pueblo, Arizona
- Died: 1942 (aged 82–83); Arizona
- Known for: ceramic artist
- Movement: Sikyátki Revival
- Spouse: Lesou (second husband)

Nampeyo (1859 – 1942) was a Hopi-Tewa potter who lived on the Hopi Reservation in Arizona. Her Tewa name was also spelled Num-pa-yu, meaning "snake that does not bite". Her name is also cited as "Nung-beh-yong," Tewa for Sand Snake.

She used ancient techniques for making and firing pottery. She used designs from "Old Hopi" pottery and shards found at 15th-century Sikyátki ruins on First Mesa. Her artwork is in collections in the United States and Europe, including many museums like the National Museum of American Art, Museum of Northern Arizona, Spurlock Museum, and the Peabody Museum of Archaeology and Ethnology at Harvard University.

A world record for Southwest American Indian pottery was declared at Bonhams Auction House in San Francisco on December 6, 2010, when one of Nampeyo's art works, a decorated ceramic pot, sold for $350,000.

== Early life ==
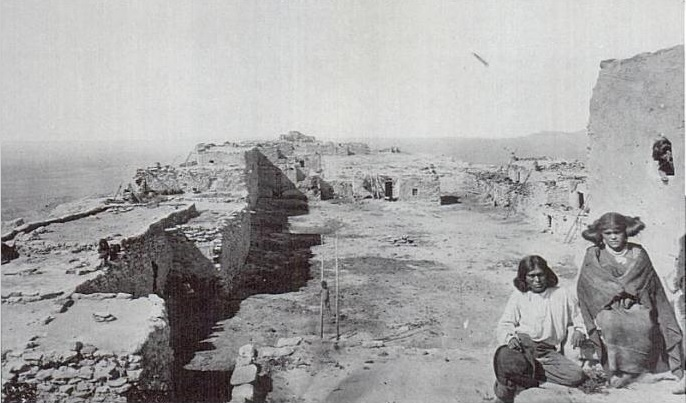
Nampeyo and her brother Tom Polacca on the rooftop of the Corn clan dwelling at the Hano village, photograph taken in 1875 by William Henry Jackson (Colorado Historical Society)

Nampeyo was born on First Mesa in the village of Hano, also known as Tewa Village which is primarily made up of descendants of the Tewa people from Northern New Mexico who fled west to Hopi lands about 1702 for protection from the Spanish after the Pueblo Revolt of 1680. Her mother, White Corn was Tewa; her father Quootsva, from nearby Walpi, was a member of the Snake clan of the Hopi Nation. According to tradition, Nampeyo was born into her mother's Tewa Corn clan. Tradition also gave her paternal grandmother the role of naming her. Her grandmother, a member of the Snake clan, named the baby Tcu-mana, or snake-girl in the Hopi language. Her mother's family, who she lived with, spoke Tewa, and so called her Nampeyo, which has the same meaning. She had three older brothers, Tom Polacca, Kano, and Patuntupi, also known as Squash; Her brothers were born from about 1849 to 1858. Nampeyo could not read or write and never went to school.

William Henry Jackson first photographed her in 1875; she was reputedly one of the most photographed ceramic artists in the Southwest during the 1870s.

Shortly after this photograph, Nampeyo married Kwivoya, but their marriage was unsuccessful and they never cohabitated. About 1878 or 1881, Nampeyo married her second husband, Lesou (or Lesso), a member of the Cedarwood clan at Walpi. Their first daughter, Annie, was born in 1884; William Lesso, was born about 1893; Nellie was born in 1896; Wesley in 1899; and Fannie was born in 1900.

== Artwork ==
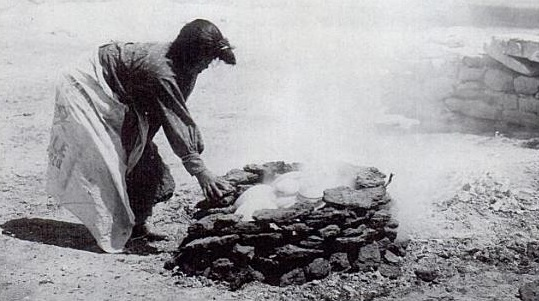
Nampeyo firing pottery, 1901

Hopi people make ceramics painted with beautiful designs, and Nampeyo was eventually considered one of the finest Hopi potters. Nampeyo may have learned Hopi pottery making through the efforts of her father's mother, though her biographer Barbara Kramer believes this theory implausible.

In the 1870s, Nampeyo made a steady income by selling her work at a local trading post operated by Thomas Keam. By 1881 she was already known for her works of "old Hopi" pottery of Walpi.

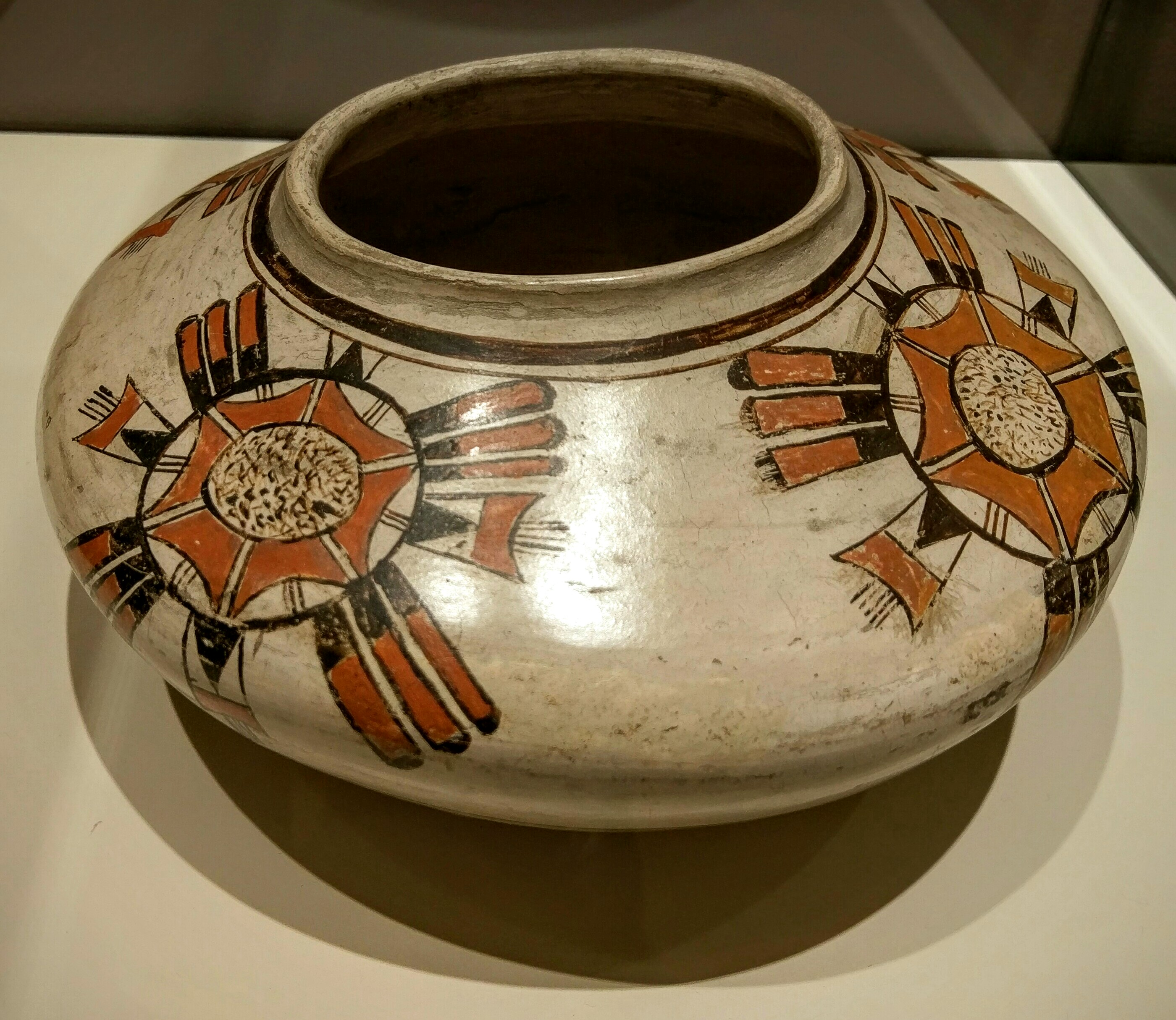
A seed jar made by Nampeyo approximately 1905

Nampeyo became increasingly interested in ancient pottery form and design, recognizing them as superior to Hopi pottery produced at the time. Lesou, her husband, was reputedly employed by the archaeologist J. Walter Fewkes at the excavation of the ancient ruins of the Hopi village Sikyátki on the First Mesa in the 1890s. Lesou helped Nampeyo find potsherds with ancient designs which they copied onto paper and were later integrated into Nampeyo's pottery. However, she began making copies of protohistoric pottery from the 15th through 17th centuries from ancient village sites, such as Sikyátki, which was explored before Fewkes and Thomas Varker Keam. Nampeyo developed her own style based on the traditional designs, known as Hopi Revival pottery from old Hopi designs and Sikyátki pottery. This is why researchers refer to her style as Sikyatki Revival after the proto-historic site.

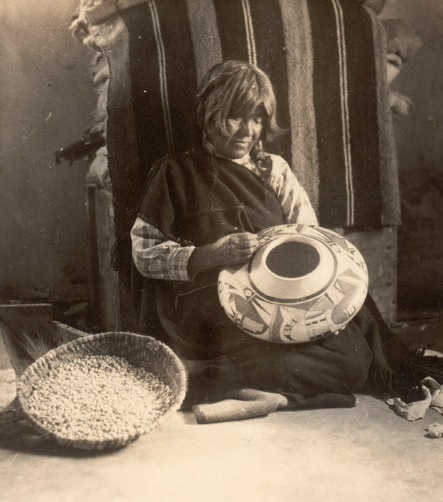
Nampeyo with one of her Sikyátki Revival vessels, ca. 1908–1910. Hopi, Arizona. Photo by Charles M. Wood. P07128

Keam hired First Mesa potters to make reproductions of the works. Nampeyo was particularly skilled. Her pottery became a success and was collected throughout the United States and in Europe.

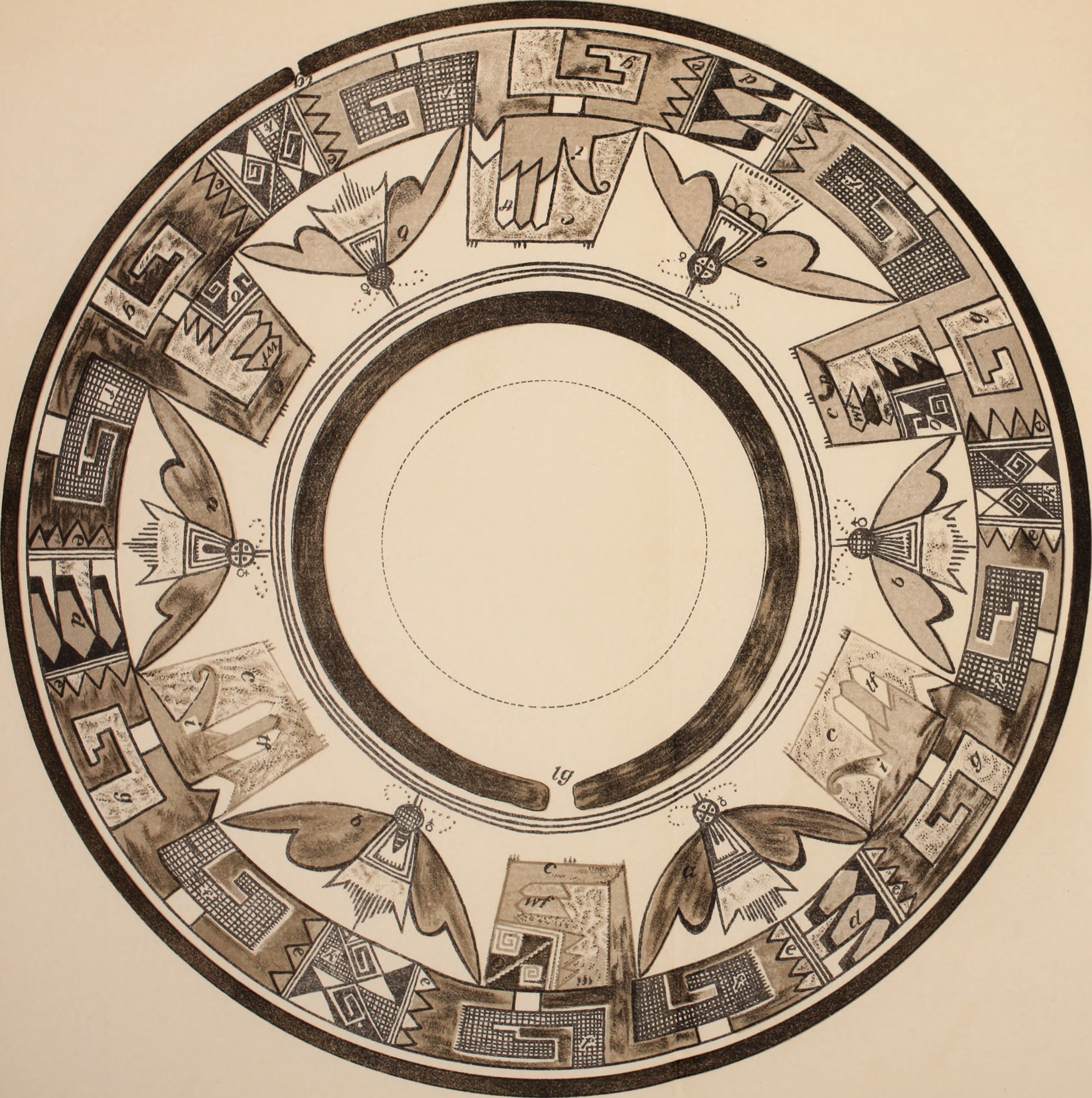
Sikyatki moth-pattern jar, excavated circa 1895. This became one of her favorite patterns.

When I first began to paint, I used to go to the ancient village and pick up pieces of pottery and copy the designs. That is how I learned to paint. But now, I just close my eyes and see designs and I paint them.

— Nampeyo, 1920s

Kate Cory, an artist and photographer who lived among the Hopi from 1905 to 1912 at Oraibi and Walpi, wrote that Nampeyo used sheep bones in the fire, which are believed to have made the fire hot or made the pottery whiter, and smoothed the fired pots with a plant with a red blossom. Both techniques are ancient Tewa pottery practices. Nampeyo used up to five different clays in one creation when the usual was two.

Nampeyo and her husband traveled to Chicago in 1898 to exhibit her pottery. Between 1905 and 1907, she produced and sold pottery out of a pueblo-like structure called Hopi House, a tourist attraction (combination of museum, curio shop, theatre, and living space for Native American dancers and artists) at the Grand Canyon lodge, operated by the Fred Harvey Company. She exhibited in 1910 at the Chicago United States Land and Irrigation Exposition.

One of her famous patterns, the migration pattern, represented the migration of the Hopi people, with feather and bird-claw motifs. An example is a 1930s vase in the collection of the Smithsonian Institution's National Museum of the American Indian in Washington, D.C. Her work is distinguished by the shapes of the pottery and the designs. She made wide, low, rounded, shaped pottery and, in later years, tall jars. Many of her works are identifiable by her "recognizable designs" and "her artistic idiosyncrasies."

Nampeyo's photograph was often used on travel brochures for the American southwest.

Nampeyo began to lose her sight due to trachoma about the turn of the 20th century. From 1925 until her death she made pottery by touch and they were then painted by her husband, daughters or other family members. Because the painters were different, the style changed to be busier and more geometric.

== Death and legacy ==
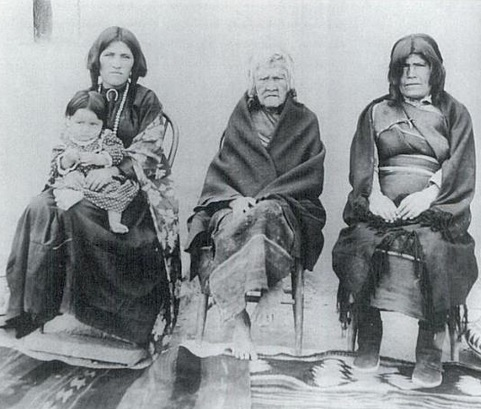
Nampeyo in 1901 (on the right) with her eldest daughter, Annie Healing (on the left) holding her granddaughter, Rachel; and mother White Corn (in the middle).

Nampeyo died in 1942 at the home of her son Wesley and her daughter-in-law, Cecilia.

She was a symbol of the Hopi people and was a leader in the revival of ancient pottery. She inspired dozens of family members over several generations to make pottery, including daughters Fannie Nampeyo and Annie Healing. A 2014 exhibit at the Museum of Northern Arizona presents the works of four generations of artists descended from Nampeyo.

In 2010, one of Nampeyo's artworks, a pot with a bulbous form with Hopi Kachina figures with "stylized faces" wearing "flamboyant black and burnt-umber headdresses" painted on "four sides of the pot"—sold for $350,000. Previous owners included Carter Harrison IV (who served as mayor of Chicago from 1897 to 1907 and 1911–1915), and the Cliff Dwellers Club art club (who were gifted the work by Harrison in the 1930s).

== Public collections ==
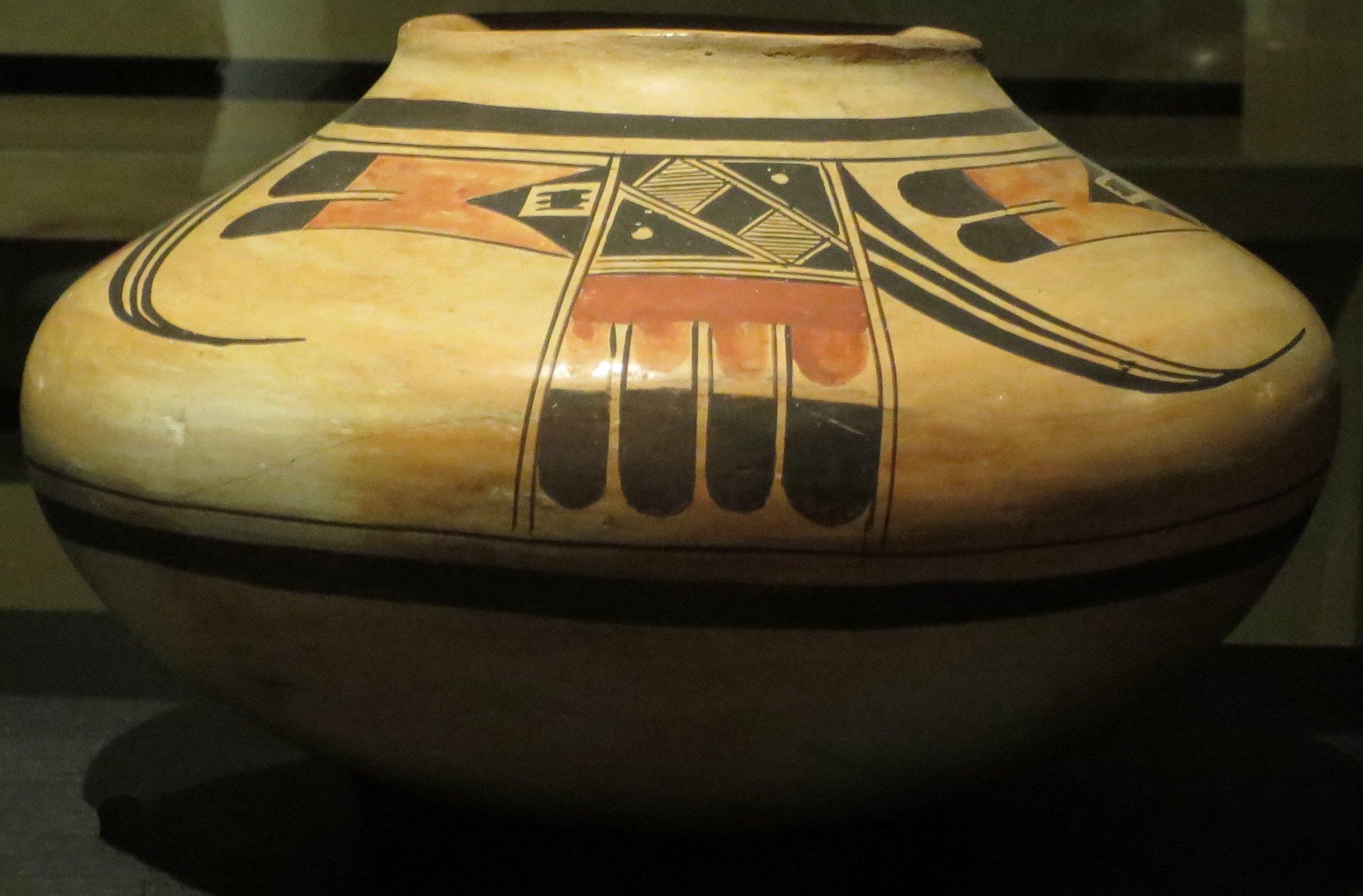
Hopi-Tewa jar made by Nampeyo, early 1900s, Heard Museum.

- Arizona State Museum, University of Arizona
- Denver Art Museum, Colorado
- Haffenreffer Museum of Anthropology at Brown University, Providence, RI
- Kansas City Museum, Kansas City, MO
- Koshare Indian Museum, La Junta, CA
- The Metropolitan Museum of Art, "Nampeyo, Polacca polychrome water jar," in Smarthistory, March 8, 2021, accessed August 13, 2025, https://smarthistory.org/nampeyo-polacca-water-jar/.
- Millicent Rogers Museum, Taos, NM
- Museum of Indian Arts and Culture/Laboratory of Anthropology, Santa Fe, NM
- Museum of Northern Arizona, Flagstaff, AZ
- National Museum of the American Indian, Smithsonian Institution, Washington, DC
- Peabody Museum of Archaeology and Ethnology, Harvard University, Cambridge, MA
- Union Station, Kansas City, MO

== See also ==
- Fannie Nampeyo, daughter
- Daisy Hooee, granddaughter
- Elva Nampeyo, granddaughter
- Dextra Nampeyo Quotskuyva, great-granddaughter
- Priscilla Namingha, great-granddaughter
- Dan Namingha, great-great-grandson
- Ida Sahmie, great-great daughter-in-law
- Nampeyo (crater), named to honor Nampeyo
