= Walpi, Arizona =

- Populated place
- Location within the state of Arizona Walpi (the United States)
- Coordinates: 35°49′56″N 110°23′52″W
- Country: United States
- State: Arizona
- County: Navajo
- Elevation: 6,181 ft (1,884 m)
- Time zone: UTC-7 (Mountain (MST))
  - Summer (DST): UTC-7 (MST)
- Area code: 928
- FIPS code: 04-80920
- GNIS feature ID: 24679

Walpi is a Hopi village established around AD 900. It is located above Arizona State Route 264, east of the Grand Canyon in Navajo County, northern Arizona. Walpi is the Hopi term for "place of the notch." Historically, the village has also been known as Ash Hill Terrace, Gaspe, Gualpi, Hualpi, Kuchapturela, Valpee, and Wolpi. Walpi became the official name as a result of a decision of the Board on Geographic Names in 1915.

Walpi is an ancient stone pueblo complex located on the First Mesa (of three), 300 feet (91 m) above the canyon floor, on the Hopi Reservation. The villages of Sichomovi and Tewa (Hano) are also on First Mesa, both established after the Pueblo Revolt of 1680 against the Spanish missions.

== History ==
Walpi, of the Hopi people, is one of the older continuously inhabited villages in the United States, continuously inhabited for more than 1100 years since around 900 AD. It is an example of traditional Hopi stone architecture, used for their historic pueblos built at defensive locations on the mesa tops.

The stone pueblo subtly rising from the stone mesa was well documented by photographs in the latter 19th century, by Edward S. Curtis, John K. Hillers, and others. Ansel Adams continued in the 20th century, along with increasing tourists' 'snapshots' via Fred Harvey bus tours and their own automobiles up from Route 66.

=== Present day ===
The First Mesa Tourism Program describes the village of Walpi as "a living village where the homes are passed down through matrilineal clan lineage."

About half a dozen in number live in the ancient stone dwellings, without running water or electricity, in the traditional manner.

Access

Walpi is accessible to visitors by guided tours, given by the First Mesa Consolidated Villages' Tourism Program.

Walpi

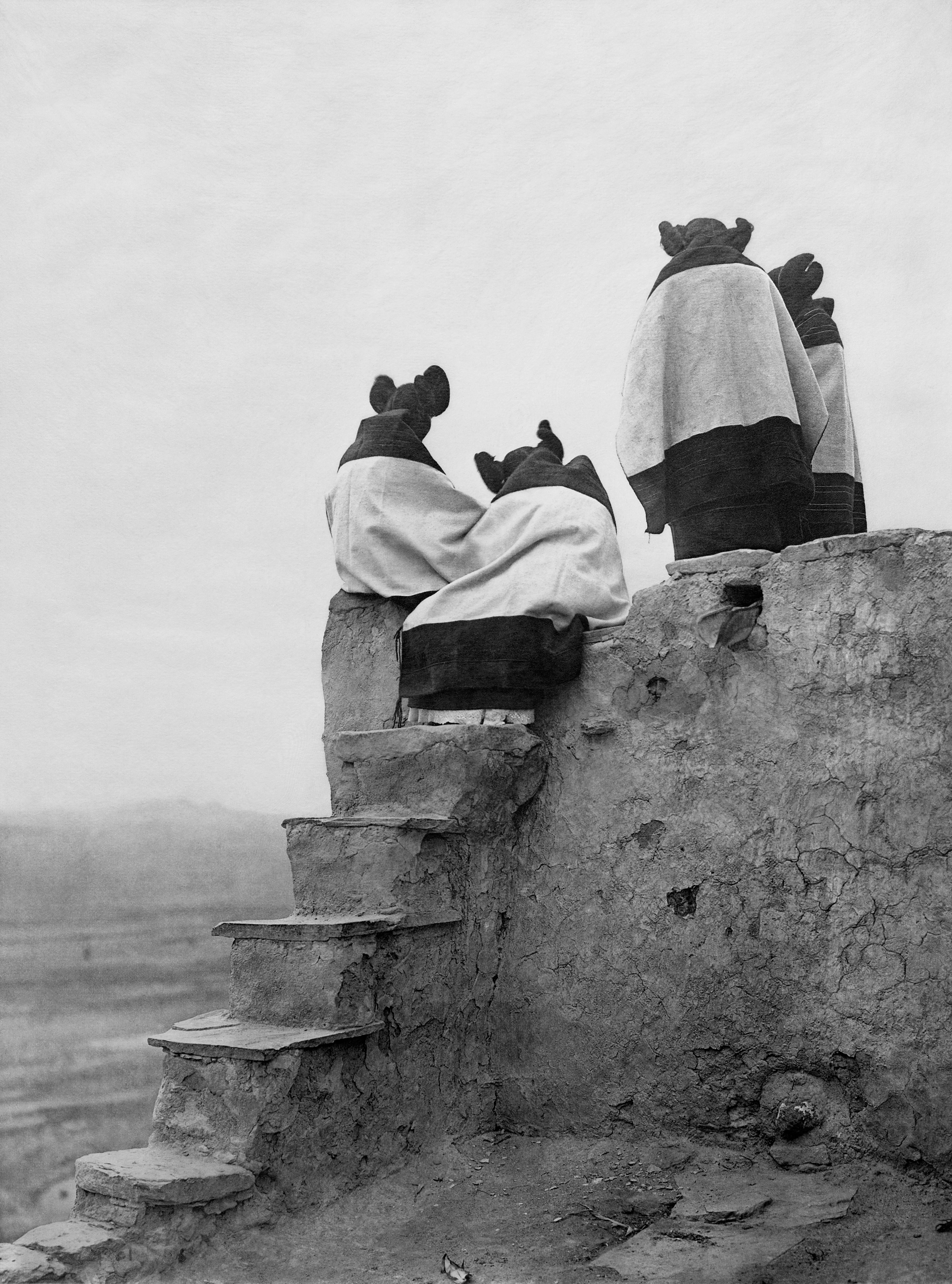
Watching the Dancers at Walpi (1906), by Edward S. Curtis.
A photo classified as an "Item in High Demand" by the Library of Congress.

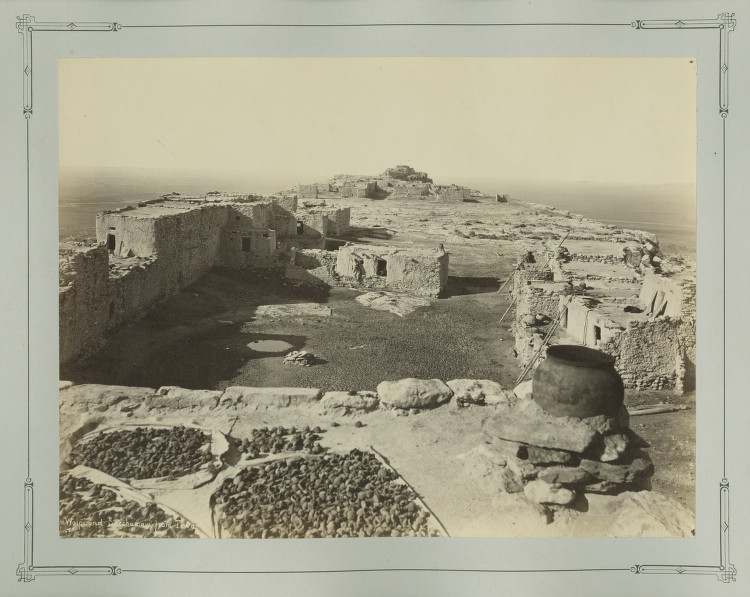
Walpi (circa 1877), by John Karl Hillers.

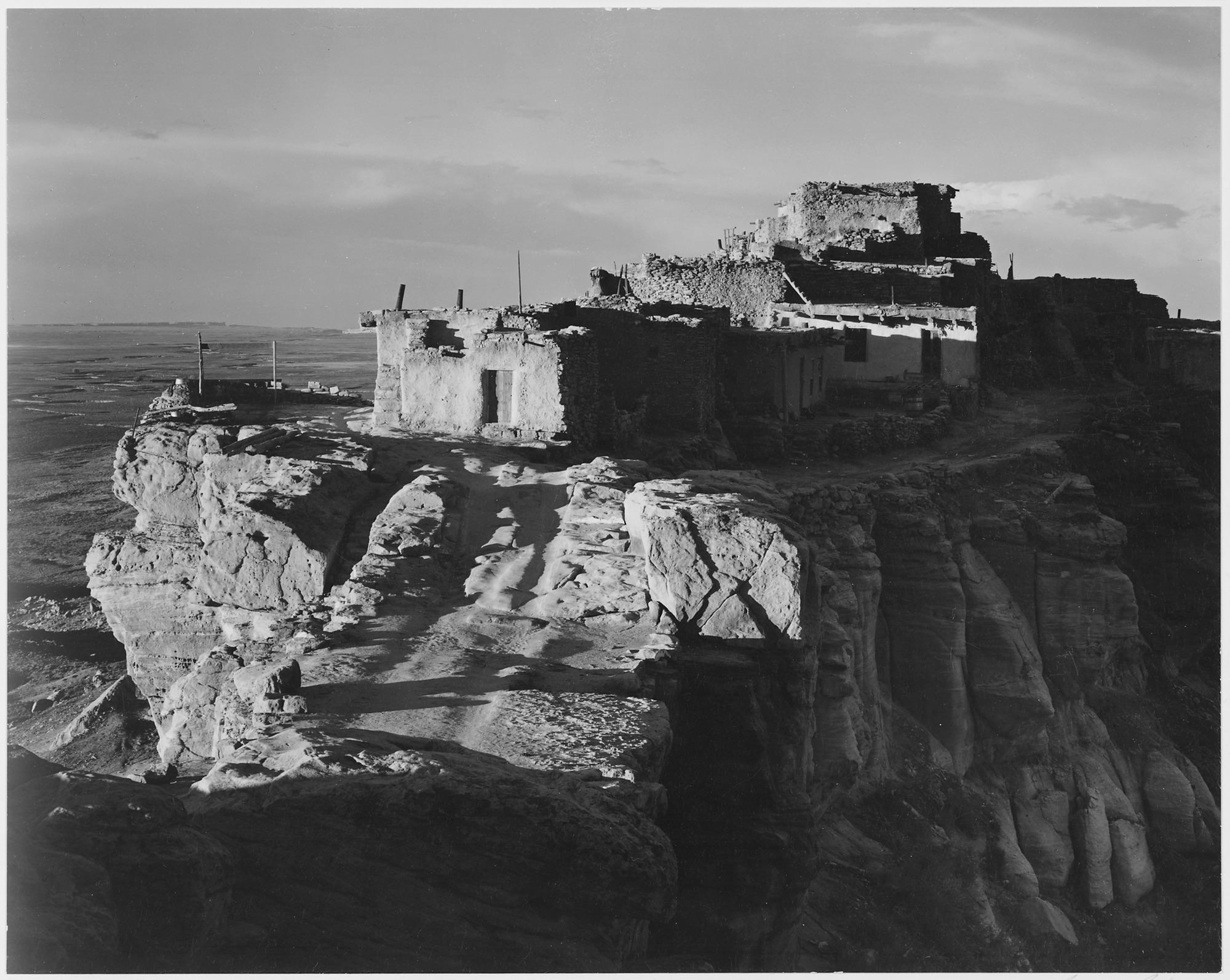
Walpi and First Mesa (1941), by Ansel Adams.

== See also ==
- Hopi mythology
- Hopi Kachina dolls
- Sikyátki
