= Naha Civic Hall =

Demolished event hall in Naha, Japan

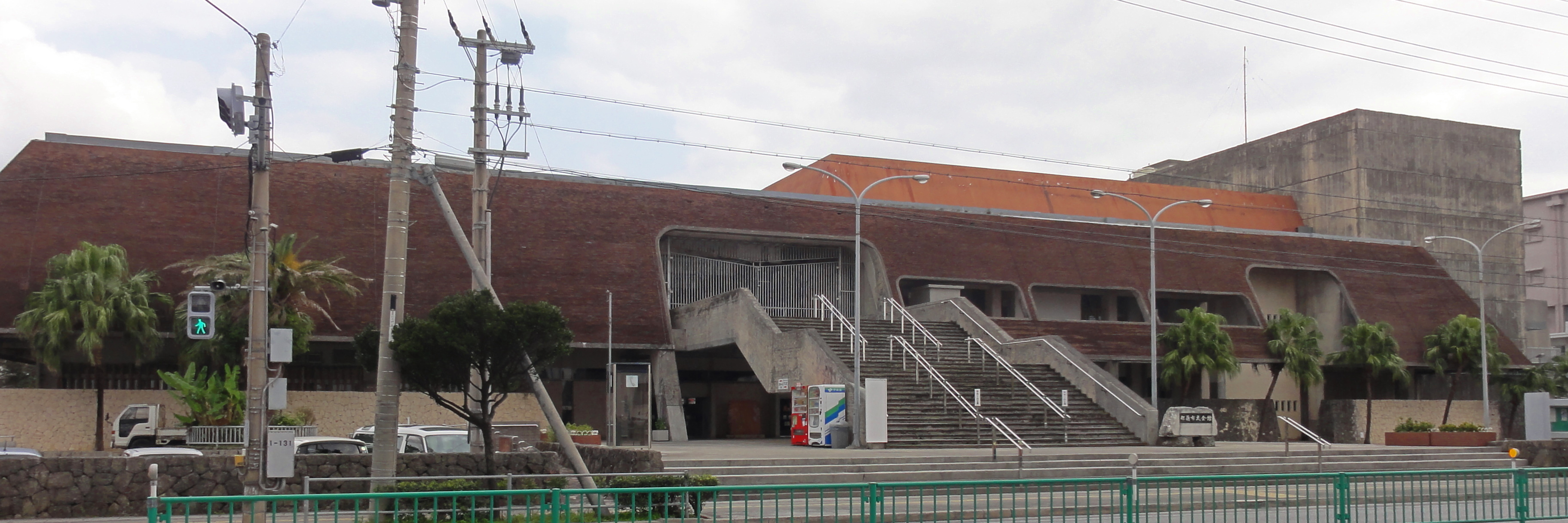
Naha Civic Hall

The Naha Civic Hall (那覇市民会館, Nahashiminkaikan) was a multi-purpose event hall located in Naha, Japan. It was completed in November 1970 and was closed in October 2016 for safety reasons. Its function as a performance hall was transferred to the Naha Cultural Arts Theater NAHArt, that opened on October the 31st, 2021.The hall hosted notable bands such as Kansas.

== Outline ==
It was completed in November 1970 under the United States Civil Administration of the Ryukyu Islands. At that time, the capacity of the Great Hall was 1504 seats, and that of the Medium Hall of 800 seats.

On May the 15th, 1972, for the Okinawa Reversion, it was used as the venue for the Reversion Ceremony (held simultaneously at the Nippon Budōkan in Tōkyō), attended by the Japanese Prime Minister Eisaku Satō.

Large scale refurbishment works in 1993 downsized the capacity of the Great Hall from 1504 seats to 1372.

In 2006 it was chosen as one of the buildings on the DOCOMOMO JAPAN Japanese Modern Movement Architecture list.

== Closing ==
Due to the population growth, it had become difficult to hold large scale events in the Naha Civic Hall. For instance, events such as the Prefectural Brass Band Competition started to be held at the Okinawa Convention Center in Ginowan. As one of the measures to revitalise the city centre, Mayor Takeshi Onaga announced a plan to relocate the civic hall on the site of the former Kumoji Municipal Elementary School (Kumoji and Maejima Municipal Elementary Schools had merged into the Naha Municipal Elementary School, that had opened on the site of the former Maejima Municipal Elementary School in April 2014).

Naha Civic Hall was closed on October the 13th 2016 after a seismic diagnostic study held in 2015 had found that it was at risk of collapsing in case of a major earthquake. The "Naha Civic Hall Preservation Possibility Committee", formed to consider the various preservation methods available, advocated in September 2019 for a partial restoration. On September the 25th the same year the new Naha City culture and arts transmission facility was named the Naha Cultural Arts Theater NAHArt.

== Use of the former site ==
In September 2024, the Mawashi Branch of the Naha City Hall had to close due to the old age of the building, and its functions are planned to be transferred to the "New Mawashi Branch Multipurpose Facility (temporary name)" that will be built at the location of the former civic hall in 2028.

== Access ==
10 minutes' walk from Yui Rail Asato Station

== Surroundings ==
- Yogi Park
- Former Okinawa Prefectural Library
- Naha City Municipal Library
