= Tyra Naha =

American potter

- Known for: Pottery
- Style: Traditional Hopi pottery
- Movement: Native American Arts and Crafts Movement
- Children: Amber Naha-Black

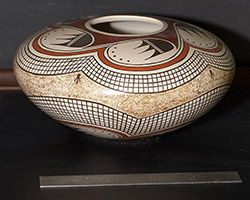
Bearclaw design seedpot

Tyra Naha (or Tyra Naha-Black, or Tyra Naha Tawawina) represents the 4th generation in a family of well-known Hopi potters. She is a Native American potter from the Hopi Tribe of Arizona in the Southwest United States. While she is currently not as well known as her famous elders, she is technically nicely proficient. Her work has been featured at shows in Santa Fe and at the Heard Museum, and appears in The Art of the Hopi.

Tyra Naha's daughter, Amber Naha-Black, is also a potter.

Tyra signs her pots with a feather and a spider glyph. The feather represents her lineage to the Naha family through her grandmother, who signed with a feather glyph. The spider is her clan symbol.

== See also ==
- Potter Helen Naha – aka "Feather Woman," her grandmother
