= Reshma Nilofer Naha =

Indian aviator

Reshma Nilofer Visalakshi
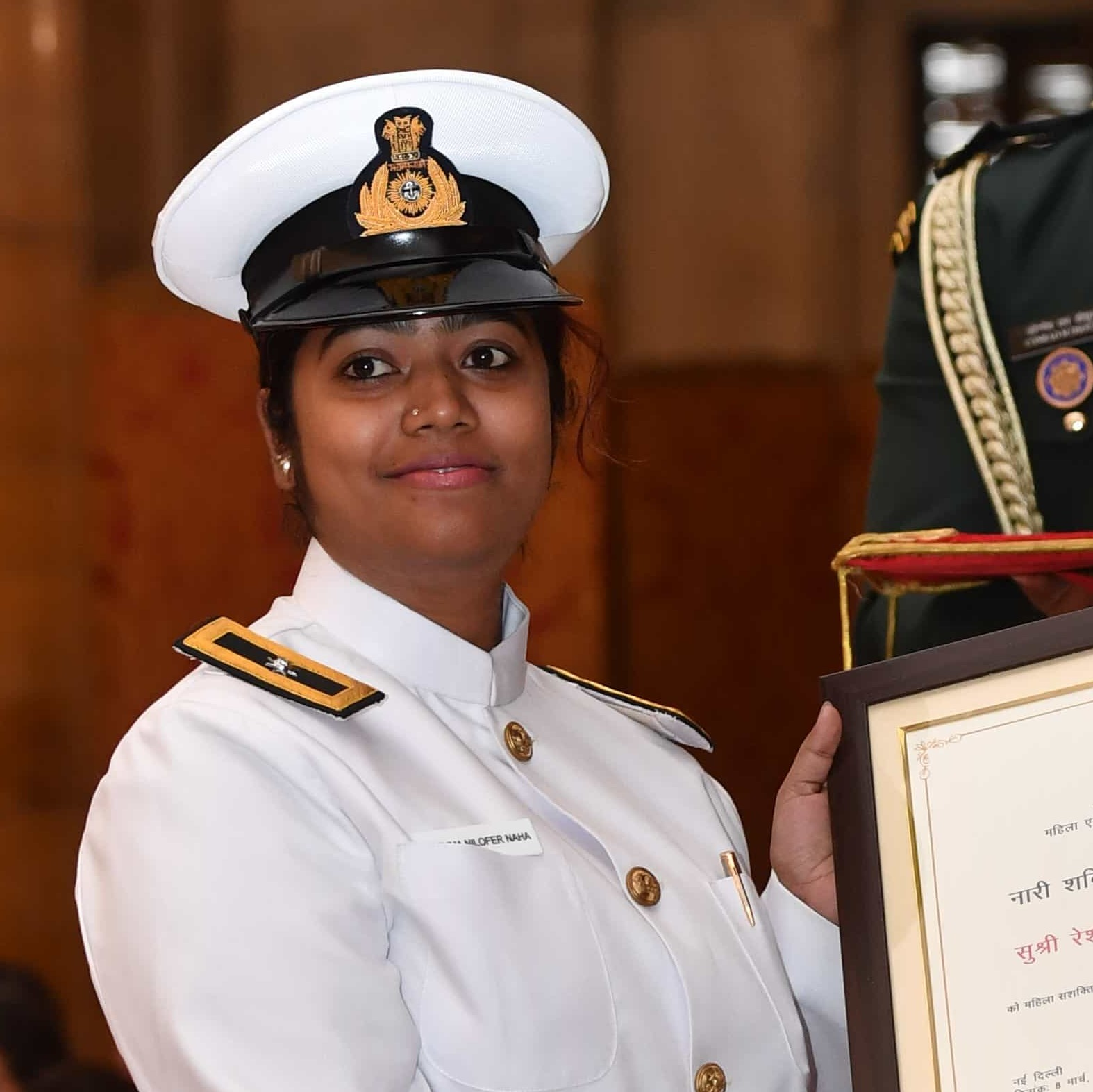
- Born: 4 February 1989 (age 37); Chennai, Tamil Nadu
- Education: AMET, Kanathur
- Alma mater: Birla Institute of Technology, Ranchi
- Occupation: maritime pilot
- Known for: India's first woman marine pilot and one among an elite few women River Pilots in the World

Reshma Nilofer Visalakshi is an Indian maritime pilot who currently involves in steering ships from sea to Kolkata & Haldia port. She became the first Indian as well as one among world's very few female marine pilots after qualifying as a river pilot in 2018. She received Nari Shakti Puraskar Award in 2019 from the current Indian President Ram Nath Kovind.

She joined the Kolkata Port Trust in 2011 as a trainee and became Hooghly River pilot in 2018. She holds a B.E in Marine Technology from Birla Institute of Technology, Ranchi.

== See also ==
- Abhinandan Varthaman
