= Naha, Ghana =

Coordinates: 9°52′N 2°26′W

Naha is a community in Tolon District in the Northern Region of Ghana.
