= Froggy =

Froggy may refer to:

- Frog, especially a diminutive version
- An ethnic slur to describe the French

== Nickname, pen name or stage name ==
- Kermit Davis (born 1959), men's head basketball coach at Middle Tennessee State University
- F. Gwynplaine MacIntyre (1948-2010), journalist, novelist, poet and illustrator
- Tiffani McReynolds (born 1991), American hurdler
- Alan Thomson (cricketer) (born 1945), Australian former cricketer
- DJ Froggy, real name Steven Howlett, British DJ
- Froggy Fresh, American rapper

== Fictional characters ==
- Froggy the Gremlin, on the Buster Brown Gang radio show and Andy's Gang TV show in the 1940s and 1950s
- Froggy, an Our Gang film character played by Billy Laughlin
- Froggy, in Russell Banks's novel Rule of the Bone
- "Froggy" LeSueur, in The Foreigner (play)
- Froggy (Sonic the Hedgehog character), a frog in the Sonic the Hedgehog series of video games
- Froggy, the titular character of the Froggy book series written by Jonathan London
- Froggy, a character in ENA: Dream BBQ

== Other uses ==
- Froggy (game), a Commodore 64 computer game
- Froggy (brand), a brand of radio stations that play mostly country music
- Froggy (ISP), an Australian internet service provider that went bankrupt in 2002

== See also ==
- Frogger (disambiguation)
