= Joy Navasie =

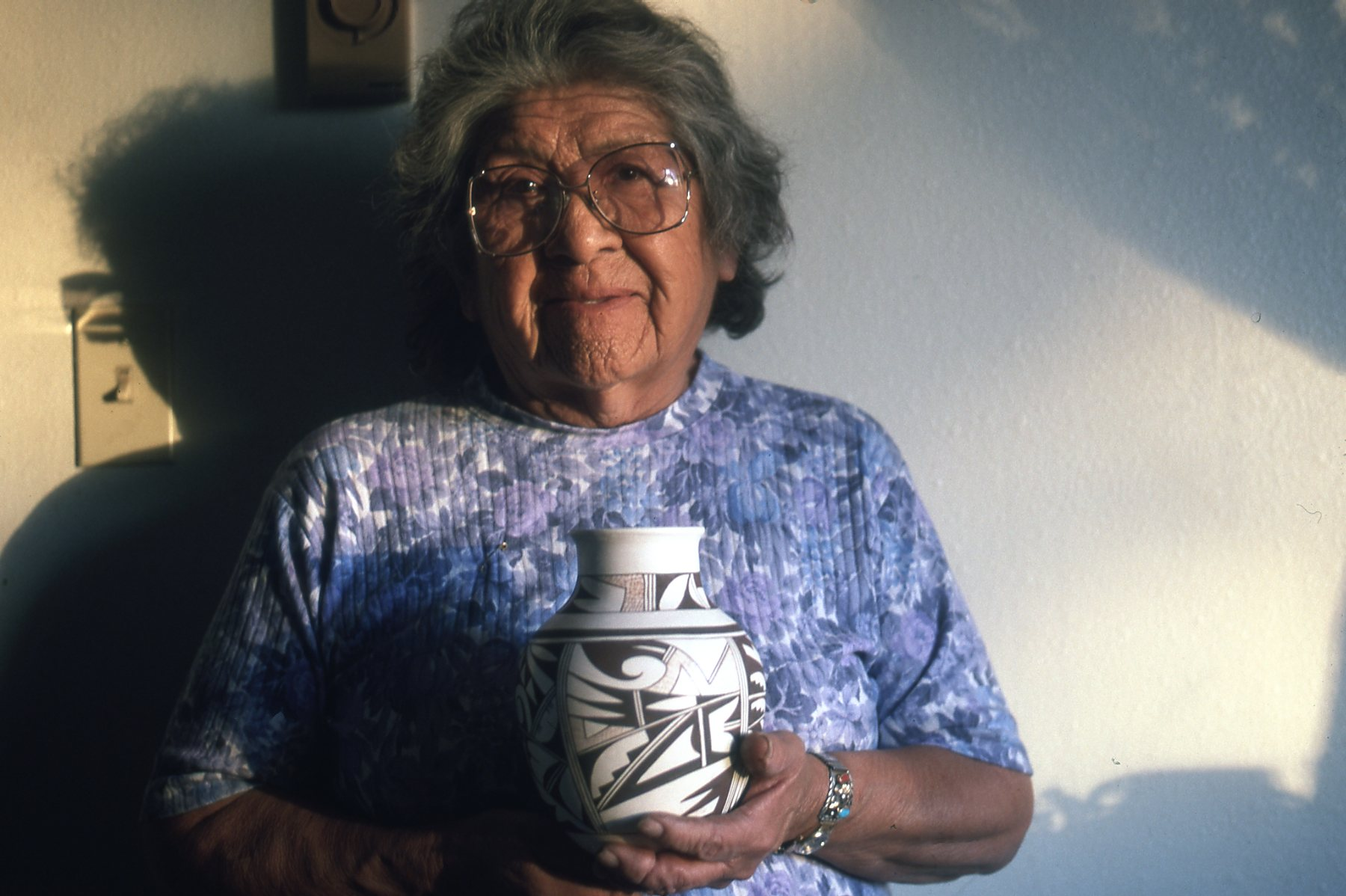
- Joy Navasie (1994), holding a pot
- Born: 1919
- Died: 2012 (aged 92–93)
- Other names: "Frog Woman", "Yellow Flower"
- Citizenship: American
- Movement: Pueblo pottery

Joy Navasie (also known as second Frog Woman or Yellow Flower; 1919–2012) was a Hopi-Tewa potter. Her work has been recognized globally.

== Biography ==
Joy Navasie was born in 1919. As well as the art of pottery, the name Frog Woman was passed down from her mother, Paqua Naha.

Navasie carries on the white ware pottery tradition from her mother, which she contends was developed around 1951 or 1952. She is particularly known for her black and red on white designs, and her favorite motifs include rain, clouds, parrots, and feathers. She also produces well received pottery with challenging Kachina designs. Her pots are signed with a frog—a hallmark she began around 1939. Her signature differs from her mother's in that it features web feet rather than short toes. All Navasie's pottery is made the traditional way, from the gathering of the clay to the polishing and painting. Pots are fired in sheep dung, which she says is getting more difficult to acquire, but she prefers this over commercial products.

Navasie's pots can be found in a number of museums including the Museum of Northern Arizona, Heard Museum, and Spurlock Museum and they have fetched high prices at auction, some over $1,000.

She was, alongside Terrista Naranjo and others, honored by the Nixons at a special White House reception for leading Native American artists.
