= Hano, Arizona =

Populated place in Navajo County, Arizona

- Populated Place
- Location within the state of Arizona Hano (the United States)
- Coordinates: 35°50′13″N 110°23′32″W
- Country: United States
- State: Arizona
- County: Navajo
- Elevation: 6,211 ft (1,893 m)
- Time zone: UTC-7 (Mountain (MST))
  - Summer (DST): UTC-7 (MST)
- Area code: 928
- FIPS code: 04-31040
- GNIS feature ID: 5545

Hano is a populated place situated in the First Mesa CDP in Navajo County, Arizona, United States, on the Hopi Reservation.

It is located on the southern end of First Mesa, approximately 0.7 miles (1.1 km) west of Polacca.

== History ==
The village was settled by the Hopi-Tewa, a band of Tewa people, in the early 17th century on First Mesa.

== Name ==
The village has been known by a plethora of names, including Ha-no-me, Hanoki, Janogualpa, Na-ca-ci-kin, Tanoquevi, Tanus, Te-e-wun-na, and Tewa. In 1915, the Board on Geographic Names officially named it Tegua, before changing their decision in 1989 to the current Hano. Hano is a Hopi term meaning "eastern people".
