= Kukum, Honiara =

Coordinates: 9°26′S 159°59′E

Kukum
- Ward
- Interactive map of Kukum
- Country: Solomon Islands
- Island: Guadalcanal
- Time zone: UTC+11 (UTC)

Kukum is a suburb of Honiara, Solomon Islands.
