= Michael Kabotie =

American painter (1942–2022)

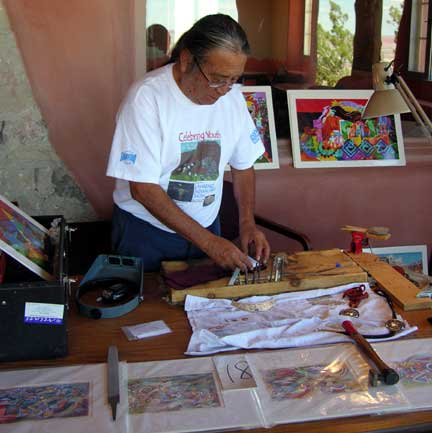
- Katobie as artist in residence at Petrified Forest National Park, 2006
- Born: Michael Kabotie; September 3, 1942; Shongopovi, Arizona, US
- Died: October 23, 2009 (aged 67); Flagstaff, Arizona, US
- Other name: Lomawywesa
- Citizenship: Hopi
- Known for: Silversmithing, painting, sculpture, poetry, printmaking

Michael Kabotie, also known as Lomawywesa (September 3, 1942 – October 23, 2009) was a Hopi silversmith, painter, sculptor, and poet. He is known for his petroglyph and geometric imagery.

== Background ==
Michael Kabotie was born September 3, 1942, in Shongopovi, Arizona to Alice Talayaonema, a traditional Hopi basket weaver, and the Hopi artist Fred Kabotie. He grew up in the village of Shongopavi and when the high school on the Hopi reservation closed, he moved and graduated from Haskell Indian School in Lawrence, Kansas in 1961. While in his junior year in high school, he was invited to spend the summer at the Southwest Indian Art Project at the University of Arizona, other participants included Fritz Scholder, Helen Hardin, Charles Loloma, and Joe Hererra (Hererra became a lifelong friend and a primary artistic mentor).

Kabotie inherited his mothers membership in the Snow Clan and he was initiated into the Hopi Wuwutsim Society in 1967. During this ceremony he was given the Hopi name, Lomawywesa (Walking in Harmony), which he used to sign his paintings and hallmark his jewelry.

His father Fred Kabotie helped develop many of the overlay techniques that have come to typify quality Hopi silverwork, and he learned these techniques as a teenager. He began to paint soon after high school and had a one-man show at the Heard Museum, soon after dropping out of University of Arizona engineering in 1966.

== Art career ==
Lomawywesa made artwork for close to fifty years. In the early 1970s Lomawywesa founded, with painters Neil David Sr, Milland Lomakema, Delbridge Honanie and Terrance Talaswaima, a group called Artist Hopid which was dedicated to new interpretation of traditional Hopi art forms. After that, Lomawywesa painted, made jewelry, wrote poetry and essays, and lectured around the country. His paintings and silverwork have an organic graffiti-like quality with dynamic motion and symbolism, with a rich color palette on canvas and an added dimension when rendered in silver.

In his paintings, Lomawywesa combined traditional kiva murals, figures from Hopi oral history, motifs present in Pueblo Native basketry and embroidery, and contemporary elements of design. Compared to his father, who depicted ceremonies in his traditional work, Lomawywesa sought to illustrate the feeling, motion, and spirituality embedded within these ceremonies. Particularly interested in the Tricksters and Clowns of Hopi history, Lomawywesa thought it important to express their purpose of bringing about harmony through the exposure of human folly and imperfection. In addition to drawing inspiration from his cultural background, Lomawywesa was greatly inspired by music ranging beyond traditional Hopi songs including Gregorian, Peruvian, and Celtic chants, as well as music from Beethoven, Jim Morrison, and the Doors, music which he claimed "[searched] deep within for the inner spirit." Lomawywesa also finds cultural connections in Buddhism and Hinduism, relating them to the Hopi initiation process of finding one's inner spirit. Lomawyesa states that "finding the middle way is the essence of all spiritual movements and the essence of my art," motivating his search for harmony, spiritual unity, and self discovery in contemporary America.

Lomawywesa's work, especially that in conjunction with his group Artist Hopid, has been compared to that of Pablo Picasso, Georges Braque, Fernand Léger, and Vasily Kandinsky for its visual similarities to cubism and expressionism. However, he did not know of these movements until after his work began to gain traction in the art world. Lomawywesa stated that both he and Artist Hopid drew from early Puebloan painters, only that they abstracted the same thematic elements of dance and song, emphasizing the motion within traditional Hopi ceremonies.

Lomawywesa lectured across America, in New Zealand, Germany, and Switzerland. His works are in such museums as the Heard Museum in Phoenix, Arizona, the Museum of Mankind in London, the Sequoyah Research Center in Little Rock, Arkansas, and the Gallery Calumet-Neuzzinger in Germany. Lomawywesa was Signature Artist for the 2010 Heard Museum Indian Fair and Market in Phoenix and a consultant to the Native American Arts Festival on Idyllwild Art's campus in Idyllwild, California for nine years up until his death.

== Jewelry and silversmithing ==
Lomawywesa learned the overlay technique from both his father and Wallie Sekayumptewa, but did little silverwork until the late 1970s. Adding in contemporary construction methods, Lomawywesa's technique consisted of layering two pieces of silver on top of one and other, cutting the design into the top layer, and oxidizing or blackening the bottom layer to fill the negative spaces and provide relief like depth. His jewelry designs echoed his paintings, steeped in Hopi culture. He exhibited annually at Indian Market from 1982 to 1999. Though best known as a painter, he considered jewelry his livelihood, stating to CNN correspondent Bill Tucker in 2000, "Jewelry is my job. Art and painting is my journey."

Lomawywesa taught Hopi silversmithing for twenty-six years at Idyllwild Arts in California. Utilizing the techniques he practiced in his jewelry work, he designed the front gate for the Heard's Berlin Gallery and the Museum of Northern Arizona.

== Death and legacy ==
Lomawywesa died on October 23, 2009, from complications of the H1N1 swine flu at Flagstaff Medical Center in Flagstaff, Arizona. He was honored at the Museum of Northern Arizona in Flagstaff, Arizona, with an exhibit titled "Walking in Harmony: The Life and Work of Lomawywesa Michael Kabotie" showcasing his art, family, and local Hopi community. He was also given tribute by Idyllwild on July 11, 2010, with an exhibition that celebrated him as "an artist, teacher, philosopher, trickster, mythic archaeologist, and friend."

Lomawywesa has a son named Ed Kabotie who is a pottery and ceramics artist and a musician.

== See also ==
- List of Native American artists
- Native American jewelry
- Visual arts by indigenous peoples of the Americas

== Sources and external links ==
- Michael Kabotie artwork on artnet.com
- Artist's website
- Artist Hopid
