= Hopi-Tewa =

Tewa Pueblo group in Hopi Reservation in Arizona

The Hopi-Tewa (also Tano, Southern Tewa, Hano, Thano, or Arizona Tewa) are a Tewa Pueblo group that resides on the eastern part of the Hopi Reservation on or near First Mesa in northeastern Arizona.

== Name ==
The name Tano is a Spanish borrowing of an older Hopi-Tewa autonym tʰáánu tééwa, meaning "down-country people" and referring to their original homeland in the Galisteo Basin. Tano is often encountered in the anthropological literature referring to the ancestors of the Arizona Tewa before they relocated to Hopi territory. The name Hano, similarly, is a borrowing of tʰáánu into Hopi as hááno, háánòwɨ, which was then Anglicized. Hano in English also refers to Tewa Village, one of the main Arizona Tewa settlements. Other historical names include Tamos, Tamones, Atmues, Tanos, Thanos, Tagnos, Janos. Tewa is the preferred autonym (over Hano, Tano, and Hopi-Tewa) because the Tewa language refers to its people as "Tewas."

== History ==
The Hopi-Tewa are related to the Tewa communities living in the Rio Grande Valley, such as Santa Clara Pueblo and Ohkay Owingeh. Many Hopi-Tiwa are descended from the Tano, a southern branch of the Tewa which inhabited the Galisteo Basin, prior to their dispersal following the Pueblo Revolt. While many assimilated into other pueblos, including the Keresan Santo Domingo, others migrated north to the area of La Puebla, where they founded or joined the village of Ts’ą̈waḏi. Amid an increase in Apache raids, the Tano, along with Tewa from Phíˀôegeh (near Los Luceros) and other villages, joined the Hopi at First Mesa.

The long contact with Hopi peoples has led to similarities in social structure with their kinship system and their organization to clans being almost identical with the Hopi (the other Tanoan Pueblo groups do not have clans). However, the Tewa dual moiety and language has been preserved.

== Language ==
Many Hopi-Tewa are trilingual in Tewa, Hopi, and English. Some speakers also speak Spanish and/or Navajo. Hopi-Tewa is a variety of the Tewa language of Tanoan family and has been influenced by Hopi (which is an unrelated Uto-Aztecan language). Arizona Tewa and the forms of Rio Grande Tewa in New Mexico are mutually intelligible with difficulty.

What is remarkable about this speech community is that the influence of the Hopi language on Hopi-Tewa is extremely small in terms of vocabulary. Arizona Tewa speakers, although they are trilingual, maintain a strict separation of the languages (see also Code-switching: Example). These attitudes of linguistic purism may be compared with other Tewa speech communities in New Mexico where there has been very little borrowing from Spanish even though the Tewa and Spanish have had long periods of contact and the Tewa were also bilingual in Tewa and Spanish.

Traditionally, the Hopi-Tewa were translators for Hopi leaders and thus also had command of Spanish and Navajo. This contrasts with the Hopi who generally can not speak Tewa (although they may have limited proficiency in Navajo).

== Notable people ==
- Nakotah LaRance, hoop dancer
- Nampeyo, potter
- Fannie Nampeyo, potter, daughter of Nampeyo
- Elva Nampeyo, potter, granddaughter of Nampeyo
- Priscilla Namingha Nampeyo, potter, great-granddaughter of Nampeyo
- Joy Navasie, second Frog Woman, potter
- Dextra Quotskuyva, potter, great-granddaughter of Nampeyo
- Neil David Sr, artist; katsina figure carver

== See also ==
- Hopi
- Hopi Reservation
- Pueblo people
- Pueblo Revolt
- Tewa language

== Bibliography ==
- Dozier, Edward P. (1951). "Resistance to acculturation and assimilation in an Indian pueblo". American Anthropologist. 53 (1): 56–66. doi:10.1525/aa.1951.53.1.02a00060.
- Dozier, Edward P. (1954). The Hopi-Tewa of Arizona. Berkeley: University of California.
- Dozier, Edward P. (1956a). "Two examples of linguistic acculturation: The Yaqui of Sonora and Arizona and the Tewa of New Mexico". Language. 32 (1): 146–157. doi:10.2307/410663. JSTOR 410663.
- Dozier, Edward P. (1956b). "The role of the Hopi-Tewa migration legend in reinforcing cultural patterns and prescribing social behavior". The Journal of American Folklore. 69 (272): 176–180. doi:10.2307/537276. JSTOR 537276.
- Dozier, Edward P. (1960). "The pueblos of the south-western United States". The Journal of the Royal Anthropological Institute of Great Britain and Ireland. 90 (1): 146–160. doi:10.2307/2844222. JSTOR 2844222.
- Dozier, Edward P. (1966). Hano: A Tewa Indian Community in Arizona. Holt, Rinehart and Winston, Inc.
- Kroskrity, Paul V. (2000). Language ideologies in the expression and representation of Arizona Tewa identity. In P. V. Kroskrity (Ed.), Regimes of language: Ideologies, polities, and identities (pp. 329–359). Santa Fe: School of American Research Press.
- Stanislawski, Michael B. (1979). Hopi-Tewa. In A. Ortiz (Ed.), Southwest (pp. 587–602). W. C. Sturtevant (Ed.), Handbook of North American Indians (Vol. 9). Washington, D.C.: Smithsonian Institution.
