= Sikyátki =

Former Hopi village

Coordinates: 35°51′32″N 110°22′12″W

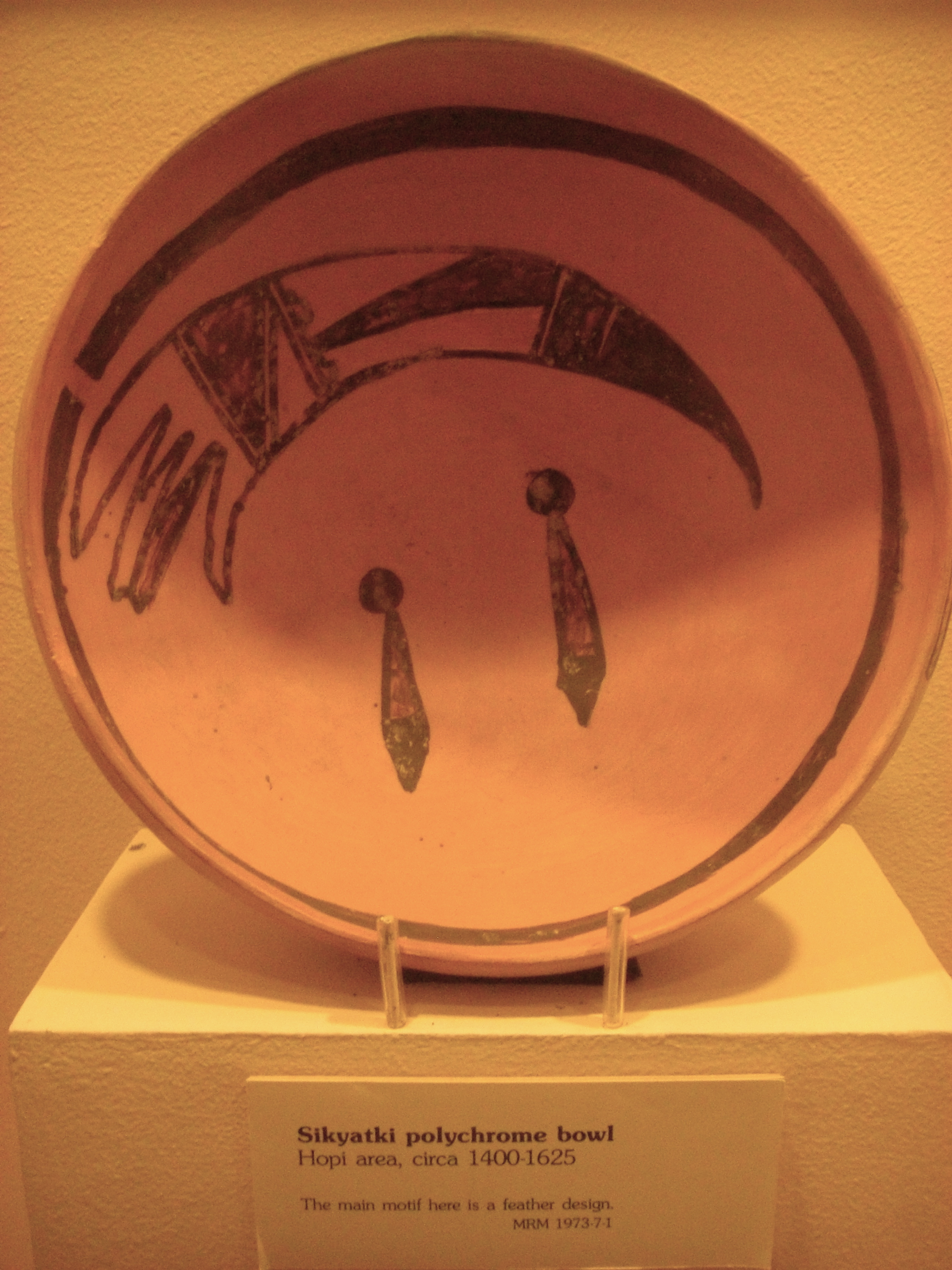
Sikyátki bowl, AD circa 1400-1625

Sikyátki is an archeological site and former Hopi village spanning 40,000 to 60,000 square metres (430,000 to 650,000 sq ft) on the eastern side of First Mesa, in what is now Navajo County in the U.S. state of Arizona. The village was inhabited by Kokop (Firewood) clan of the Hopi from the 14th to the 17th century. Jesse Walter Fewkes led a Smithsonian Institution funded excavation of the site in 1895. During the excavations many well-preserved ceramic sherds were found. The designs on the sherds inspired the artist Nampeyo; sparking the Sikyátki revival in polychrome pottery.

Sikyátki means "Yellow House" in the Hopi language. According to oral history, the neighboring village of Wálpi burned Sikyátki and exterminated its residents. The attack was triggered when a Sikyátki villager cut off the head of the sister of a Wálpi man who had offended him.
