= Polacca, Arizona =

Unincorporated community in the state of Arizona, United States

- Unincorporated community
- Location within Arizona Location within the United States
- Coordinates: 35°50′12″N 110°22′53″W
- Country: United States
- State: Arizona
- County: Navajo
- Tribal reservation: Hopi Reservation
- Elevation: 5,811 ft (1,771 m)
- Time zone: UTC-7 (Mountain (MST))
- ZIP code: 86042
- Area code: 928
- GNIS feature ID: 9616

Polacca is an unincorporated community in Navajo County, of northeastern Arizona, United States. It is Hopi-Tewa community on the Hopi Reservation.

== Demographics ==
10.4% of people over 25 in Polacca have a bachelor's degree or an advanced degree, significantly less than the national average of 21.8%. The per capita income in Polacca in 2010 was $10,331, which is low income relative to Arizona and the nation. This equates to an annual income of $41,324 for a family of four. Polacca also has one of the higher rates of people living in poverty in the nation, with 39.8% of its population below the federal poverty line.

== Economy ==
The town of Polacca does not have a sales tax and there is only one convenience store. There are no hotels, restaurants, gas stations, or department stores in Polacca. Many of the residents are employed by one of six major employers. Many of the residents not employed locally are artists who rely on tourists, local galleries, art shows, and internet sales.

== Education ==
Local schools:

- Polacca Head Start
- First Mesa Elementary School
- Hopi Jr/Sr High School
- Northland Pioneer College

== Employment ==
Local employers:

- Bureau of Indian Affairs
- Hopi Jr/Sr High School
- KUYI Radio
- The Hopi Tribe
- The Village of Sichomovi
- The Village of Tewa
- US Health and Human Services

== Geography ==
The town of Polacca is located in northeastern Arizona on the Colorado Plateau. Natural resources on the Colorado Plateau include coal, uranium, petroleum, and natural gas. Polacca is located along Arizona State Route 264 7.5 miles (12.1 km) northeast of the Hopi Second Mesa. Polacca has a post office with ZIP code 86042.

Some famous places to visit nearby include, the Grand Canyon, Homolovi State Park, Canyon de Chelly, Antelope Canyon, San Francisco Peaks, and Meteor Crater.

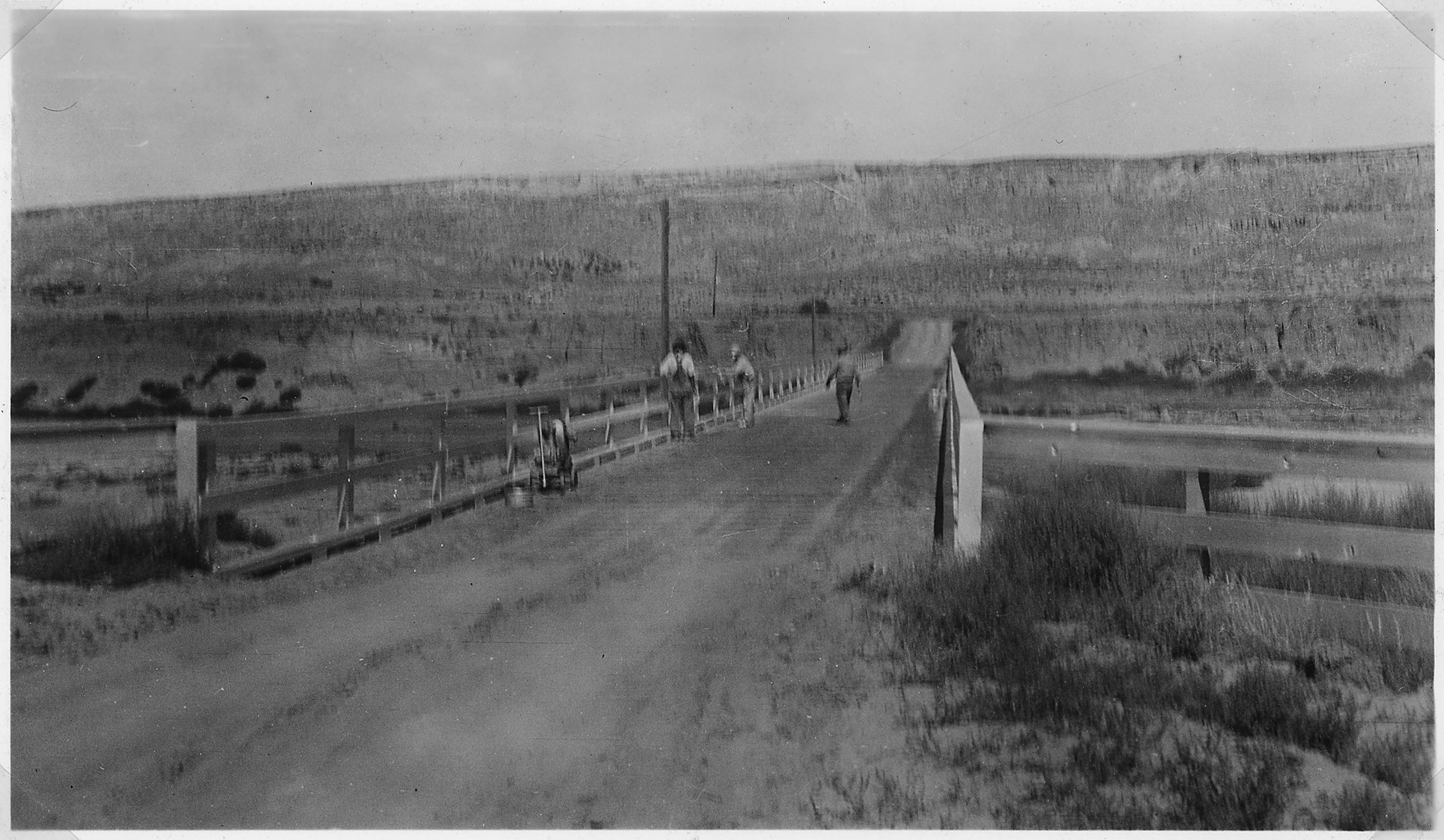
Bridge near Polacca (1940s)

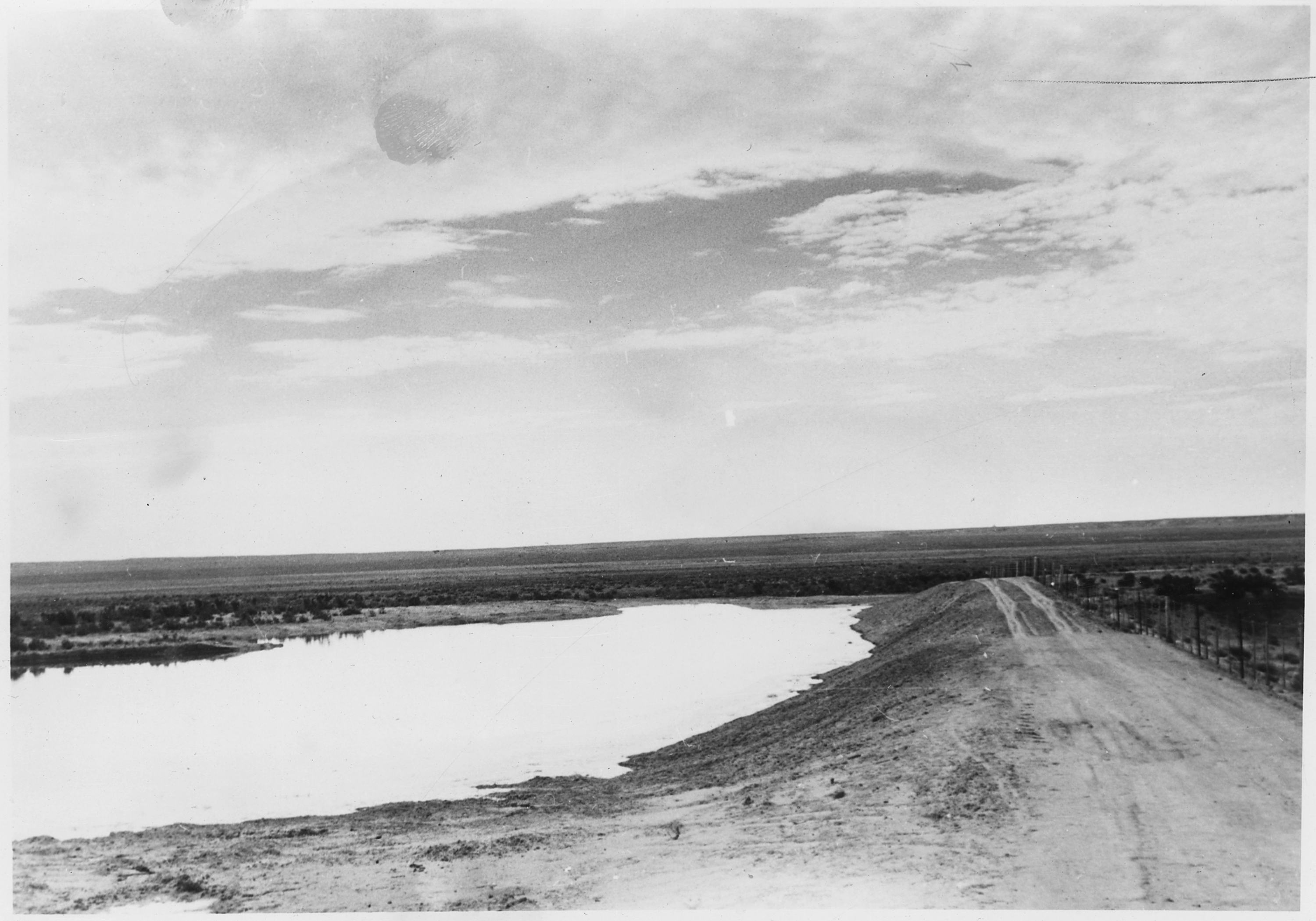
Polaca Dam below junction of Wepo and Polacca washes (1950s).

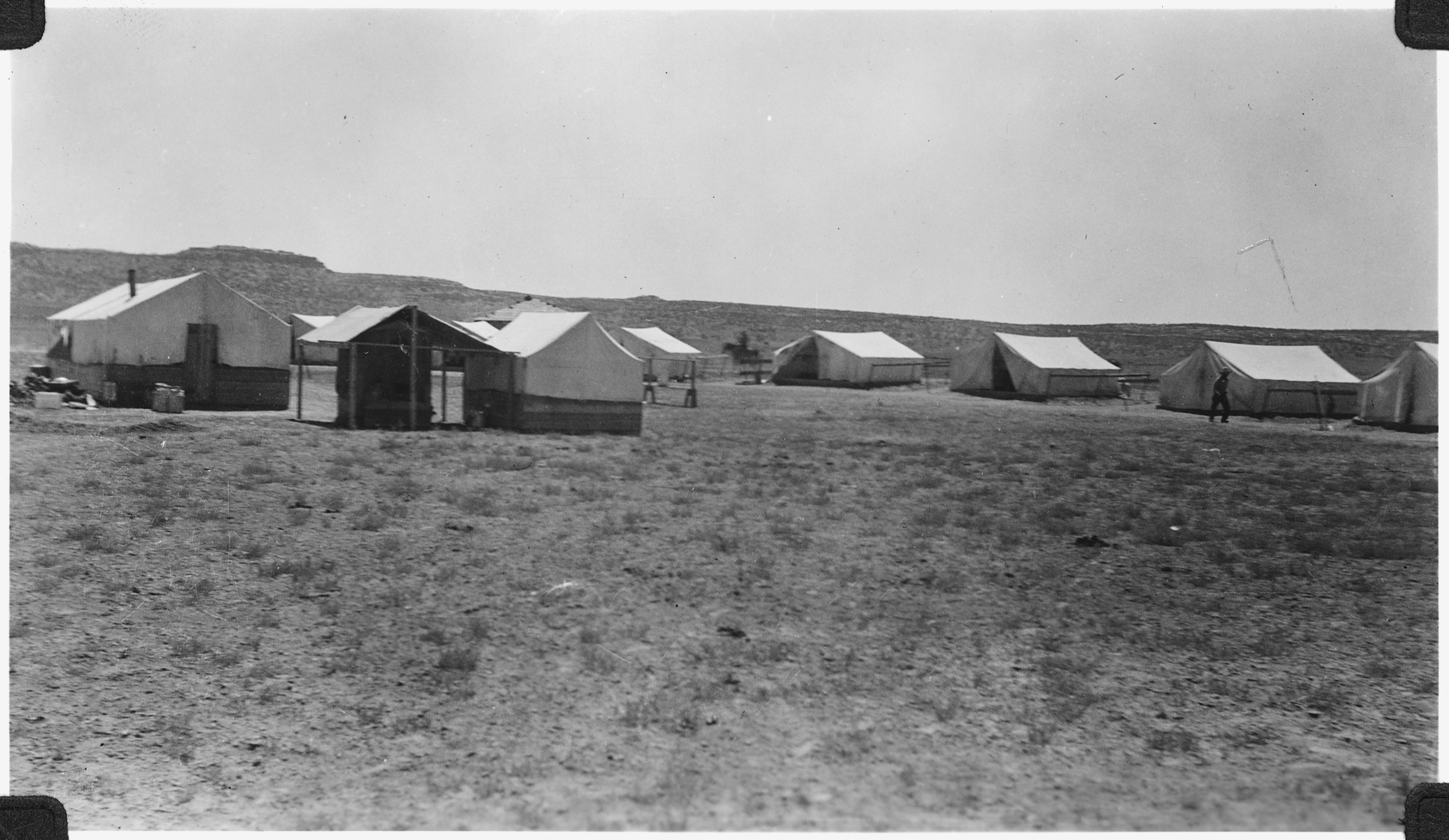
Camp in Polacca Canyon (1950s).

== History and culture ==
Polacca is a community located below the villages of First Mesa. Polacca got its name (originally pronounced Poo la ka ka) from Tom Polacca, brother to Nampeyo, the famous potter. He was a man of many talents, being fluent in many languages (Hopi, Tewa, Zuni, Spanish, English, etc.) and having a great mind for innovation. He was also the first businessman on the Hopi Reservation and among the first Hopi to convert to the Church of Jesus Christ of Latter-day Saints.

The town of Polacca is directly below First Mesa and is home to members of the Hopi tribe. Included in Polacca are: a convenience store, three churches, a Head Start school, an elementary school, and a health care center. The healthcare center is an Indian Health Service facility named the Hopi Health Care Center and provides emergency services 24-hours a day, 7-days a week.

The residents of Polacca are employed locally by the US Health and Human Services, Bureau of Indian Affairs, the Hopi Tribe, McGee's trading post, and many are self-employed. According to the site, Sperling's Best Places to Live, there were 2,046 people living in Polacca in 2016.

In Polacca, crops consist of corn, lima beans, grapes, squash, apricots, watermelon, and peaches. Corn is an important and sacred crop to the Hopi people. Blue corn is used to make somiviki, piki, tortillas, and pancakes. Squash is an important part of the Hopi diet, and has been used to make both eating utensils and musical instruments.

Polacca residents also raise cattle, horses, chickens, goats, and sheep. Mutton is a vital part of the diet during ceremonial and other events, such as baby naming and wedding ceremonies.

Residents also produce a variety of elegant arts and crafts, such as pottery, Kachina dolls, rattles, bows & arrows, baskets, jewelry and oil painting. Some notable artists from Polacca include: Anita Polacca, Nolan Youvella, Romona Ami, Neil David Sr., Tawnya Mahle, Lydia Huma Mahle, Emerson Ami, Dorothy Ami, Karen Abeita, and Nampeyo.

The Polacca Head Start Center is active in the revitalization of the Hopi language. Its Shooting Stars Hopi Lavayi Radio Project broadcasts for students in the First Mesa Dialect are carried on KUYI, 88.1 FM.

== See also ==
- Arizona Tewa
- Walpi, Arizona — includes Tewa Pueblo history.
