= First Mesa, Arizona =

CDP in Navajo County, Arizona

- CDP
- Location in Navajo County and the state of Arizona

- Location in the United States
- Coordinates: 35°50′20″N 110°22′00″W
- Country: United States
- State: Arizona
- County: Navajo

Area
  - Total: 15.75 sq mi (40.78 km^{2})
  - Land: 15.74 sq mi (40.76 km^{2})
  - Water: 0.0077 sq mi (0.02 km^{2})
- Elevation: 5,660 ft (1,730 m)

Population (2020)
  - Total: 1,352
  - Density: 85.9/sq mi (33.17/km^{2})
- Time zone: UTC-7 (MST)
- ZIP code: 86042
- Area code: 928
- FIPS code: 04-23512
- GNIS feature ID: 2408213

First Mesa (Hopi: Wàlpi) is a census-designated place (CDP) in Navajo County, Arizona, United States, on the Hopi Reservation. As of the 2010 census, the CDP population was 1,555, spread among three Hopi villages atop the 5,700-foot (1,740 m) mesa: Hano (or Tegua, Arizona), Sitsomovi (or Sichomovi), and Waalpi (or Walpi).

== History ==
Sikyátki is an abandoned village found near Walpi. According to oral tradition recorded by Henry Voth, it was destroyed by the inhabitants of Walpi.

== Geography ==
According to the United States Census Bureau, the CDP has a total area of 9.4 square miles (24 km^{2}).

== Demographics ==
=== Racial and ethnic composition ===
First Mesa CDP, Arizona – Racial composition Note: the US Census treats Hispanic/Latino as an ethnic category. This table excludes Latinos from the racial categories and assigns them to a separate category. Hispanics/Latinos may be of any race.
Race (NH = Non-Hispanic)	% 2020	% 2010	% 2000	Pop 2020	Pop 2010	Pop 2000
White alone (NH)	0.8%	1.3%	2.4%	11	20	27
Black alone (NH)	0%	0%	0%	0	0	0
American Indian alone (NH)	98.2%	97%	94.5%	1,327	1,508	1,062
Asian alone (NH)	0.1%	0.3%	0%	1	5	0
Pacific Islander alone (NH)	0%	0%	0%	0	0	0
Other race alone (NH)	0.1%	0%	0%	1	0	0
Multiracial (NH)	0.1%	0.5%	0.6%	2	7	7
Hispanic/Latino (any race)	0.7%	1%	2.5%	10	15	28

=== 2020 census ===
As of the 2020 census, First Mesa had a population of 1,352. The median age was 38.6 years. 27.2% of residents were under the age of 18 and 18.9% were 65 years of age or older. For every 100 females, there were 91.0 males, and for every 100 females age 18 and over, there were 86.4 males age 18 and over.

As of the 2020 census, 0.0% of residents lived in urban areas, while 100.0% lived in rural areas.

As of the 2020 census, there were 402 households in First Mesa, of which 48.0% had children under the age of 18 living in them. Of all households, 32.3% were married-couple households, 16.4% were households with a male householder and no spouse or partner present, and 39.3% were households with a female householder and no spouse or partner present. About 19.9% of all households were made up of individuals, and 9.2% had someone living alone who was 65 years of age or older.

As of the 2020 census, there were 555 housing units, of which 27.6% were vacant. The homeowner vacancy rate was 0.0% and the rental vacancy rate was 12.8%.

As of the 2020 census, the most reported ancestries were Hopi (84%), Navajo (4.2%), Pueblo (3.2%), and Kittian and Nevisian (1.6%).

=== Language ===
Languages (2000)	Percent
Spoke English at home	60.1%
Spoke Hopi at home	31.1%
Spoke Tewa at home	8.8%

Historical population
Census	Pop.	Note	%±
2000	1,124		—
2010	1,555		38.3%
2020	1,352		−13.1%
U.S. Decennial Census

=== 2000 census ===
As of the census of 2000, there were 1,124 people, 294 households, and 251 families residing in the CDP. The population density was 119.3 inhabitants per square mile (46.1/km^{2}). There were 367 housing units at an average density of 39.0 per square mile (15.1/km^{2}). The racial makeup of the CDP was 96.1% Native American, 2.9% White, no Black/African American, Asian, or Pacific Islander, 0.2% from other races, and 0.9% from two or more races. 2.5% of the population were Hispanic or Latino of any race.

There were 294 households, out of which 43.5% had children under the age of 18 living with them, 46.6% were married couples living together, 32.3% had a female householder with no husband present, and 14.6% were non-families. 11.6% of all households were made up of individuals, and 2.7% had someone living alone who was 65 years of age or older. The average household size was 3.82 and the average family size was 4.10.

In the CDP, the population was spread out, with 38.3% under the age of 18, 9.1% from 18 to 24, 25.3% from 25 to 44, 19.4% from 45 to 64, and 7.9% who were 65 years of age or older. The median age was 28 years. For every 100 females, there were 90.2 males. For every 100 females age 18 and over, there were 89.9 males.

The median income for a household in the CDP was $19,605, and the median income for a family was $21,346. Males had a median income of $37,000 versus $21,458 for females. The per capita income for the CDP was $7,897. About 36.5% of families and 45.2% of the population were below the poverty line, including 45.5% of those under age 18 and 21.4% of those age 65 or over.

== Education ==
First Mesa is served by the Cedar Unified School District.

Hopi High School serves First Mesa.
