= Sekaquaptewa =

Sekaquaptewa is a Hopi surname. Notable people with the surname include:

- Emory Sekaquaptewa (1928–2007), Hopi leader and scholar
- Helen Sekaquaptewa (1898–1990), Hopi Mormon homemaker, matriarch and storyteller
- Phillip Sekaquaptewa (1948–2003), Hopi artist and silversmith
