= Shell jewelry =

Jewelry made primarily of seashells

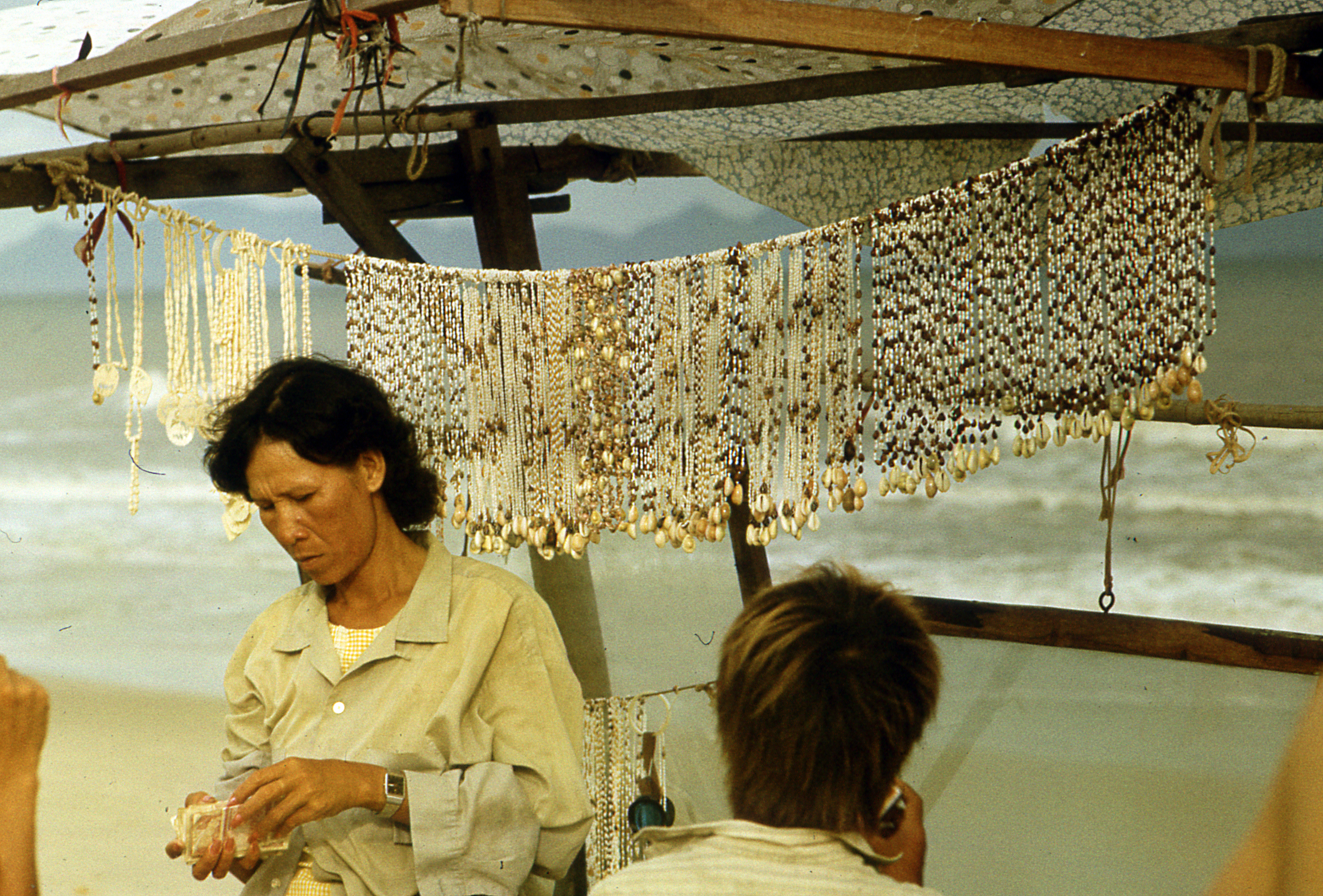
Shell jewelry for sale on a beach in Vietnam, 1990

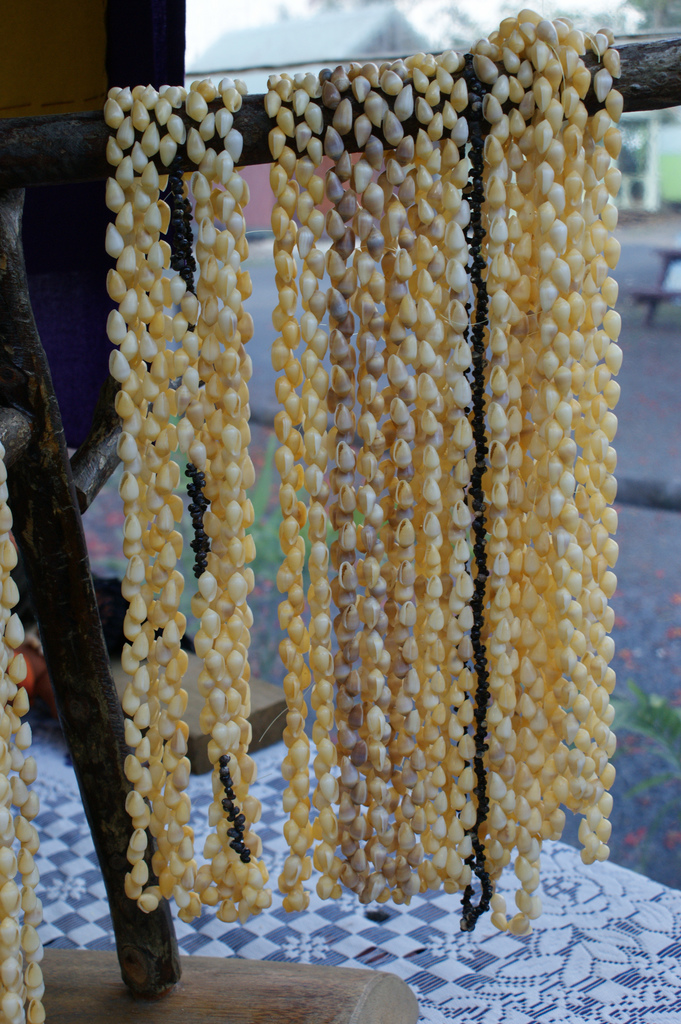
Necklaces made in Rarotonga, Cook Islands

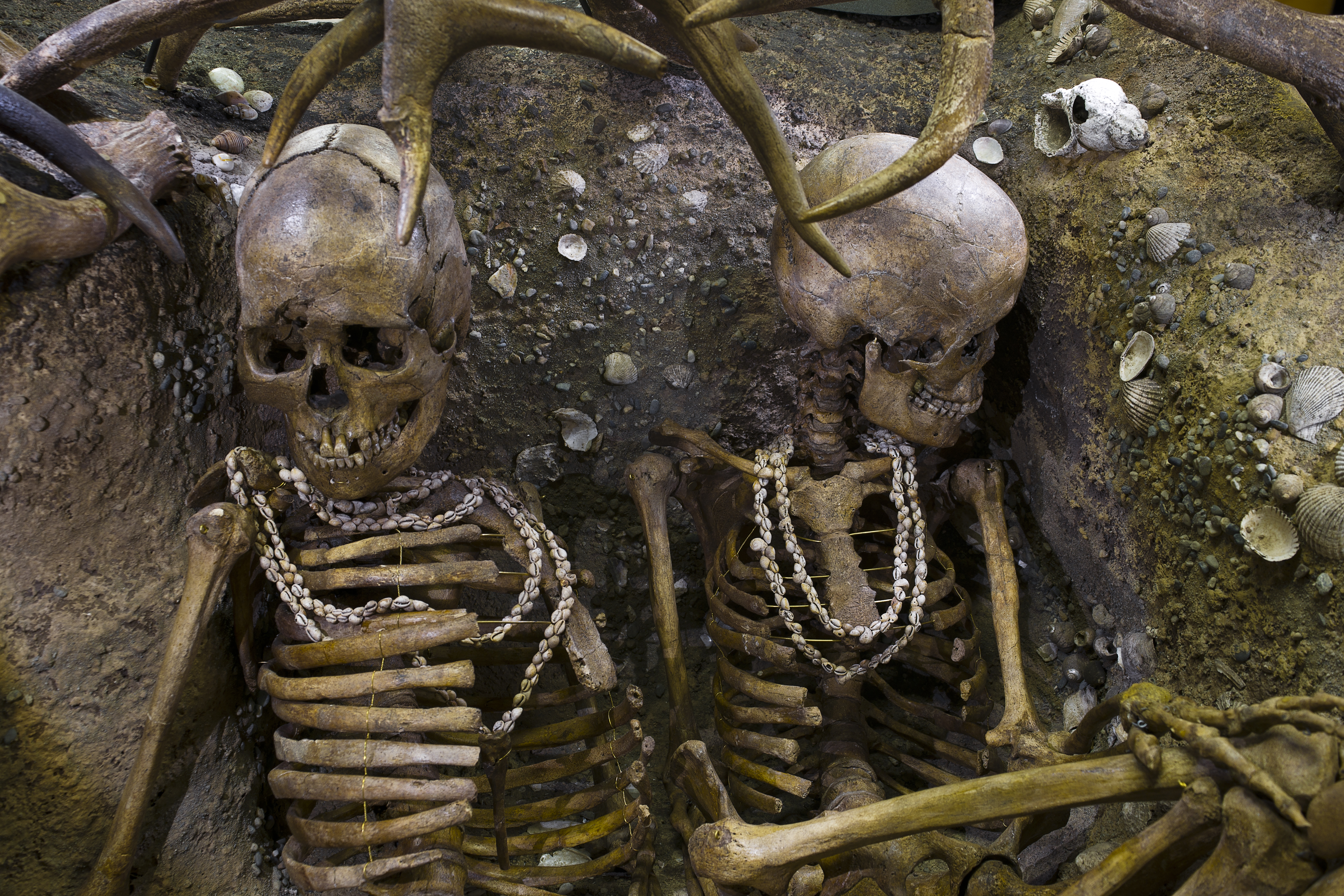
A Stone Age burial in Brittany dating from 5000-7000 BC shows the skeletons of two women who were buried wearing necklaces made of numerous shells of the sea snail Trivia.

Shell jewelry is jewelry that is primarily made from seashells, the shells of marine mollusks. Shell jewelry is a type of shellcraft. One very common form of shell jewelry is necklaces that are composed of large numbers of beads, where each individual bead is the whole (but often drilled) shell of a small sea snail. Numerous other varieties of shell jewelry are made, including bracelets and earrings.

As well as sea snail shells, shell jewelry also sometimes uses the shells of clams (bivalves) and tusk shells (scaphopods). Occasionally shell jewelry is made from the shells of non-marine mollusks such as the shells of land snails, or the shells of freshwater mollusks. Not all shell jewelry is made from whole shells; some kinds are made from parts of shells, including the shell layer known as mother of pearl or nacre, and the "trapdoor" or operculum which is part of some sea snails.

In recent times, inexpensive shell jewelry is often found at tropical beach destinations, where it is offered to tourists as informal wear, or as a souvenir. However, shell jewelry has a very ancient past, and is of great importance in archeology and anthropology. In fact, shell beads are the oldest form of jewelry known, dating back over 100,000 years.

== In prehistory ==
The oldest known jewelry in the world consists of two perforated beads made from shells of the sea snail Nassarius gibbosulus. These beads were discovered at Skhul in Palestine, and were recently dated to between 100,000 and 135,000 years ago. Similar ornaments (some made from shells of Nassarius kraussianus and the bittersweet clam Glycymeris nummaria as well as from Nassarius gibbosulus) have been discovered at a number of Middle Paleolithic sites, and are considered a key piece of evidence for the theory that early anatomically modern humans in Africa and the Levant were more culturally sophisticated than had previously been thought. In some cases shells had been transported a considerable distance from the species' natural habitat. One example is the site of Oued Djebbana in Algeria, for example, where an N. gibbosulus bead was found; at the time the shell was used there, this site was at least 190 km away from the sea.

Some of the oldest known examples of shell jewelry in Africa was around 82,000 years ago in the Taforalt Cave in North Africa. What was discovered was Nassarius shell beads so far inland that they had to have been transported from there coast, providing very strong evidence that there was a series of long distance exchanged networks. The perforations and wear marks around the wholes on the shell beads proves that the shells were strung and worn as jewelry and personal ornaments. This is one of then many examples of symbolic behavior among modern humans.

Shell ornaments were very common during the Upper Paleolithic, from 50–40,000 years ago onwards, when they spread with modern humans to Europe and Asia. They generally take the form of perforated shells (as well as other hard organic material such as tooth, bone, antler and mammoth ivory) which are thought to have been suspended and used as jewelry. The most commonly found species are Homalopoma sanguineum, Littorina obtusata, Cyclope species, Nassarius mutabilis and Nassarius gibbosulus. Fossil shells were used alongside those of contemporary species. Some shells were stained with ochre. In Europe, the shells of both Atlantic and Mediterranean species were used, again circulating over distances of hundreds of kilometers. During the Neolithic period shell necklaces were made with the shells of 3 genera Spondylus, Glycymeris and Charonia.

== See also ==
- Cameo (carving)
- Dentalium shell
- Heishe
- Puka shell
- Shell gorget
- Wampum
