= Heishi =

Heishi may refer to:

- Taira clan of Japan, also known as Heishi (平氏)
- Heishe or heishi, disk-shaped shell, coral or turquoise beads, created by Pueblo people
