= Gail Bird and Yazzie Johnson =

Southwestern American Indian artists

Gail Bird Yazzie Johnson
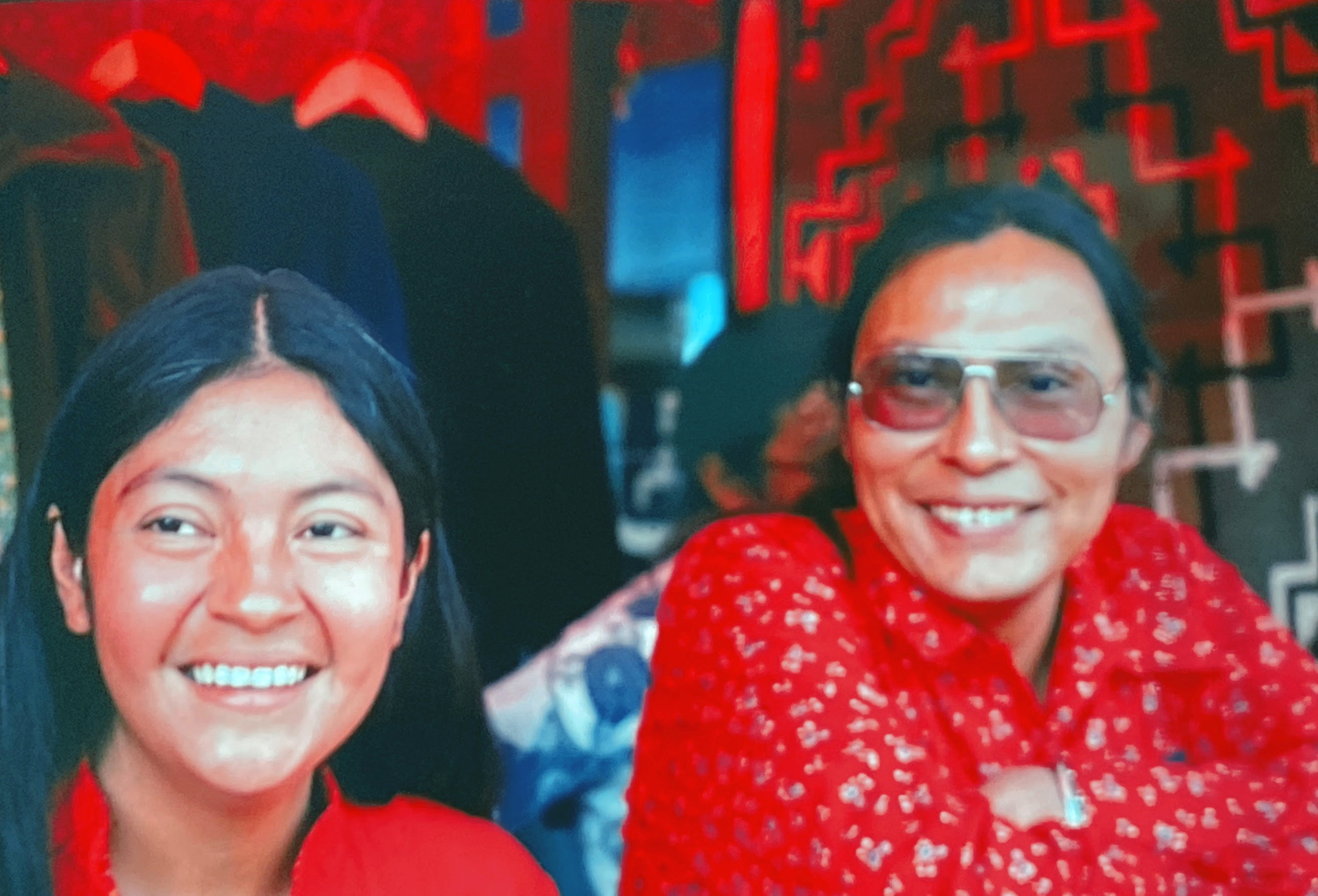
- Southwest American Indian jewelry artist, Gail Bird, in 1979
- Born: 1949 (age 76–77) (Gail Bird); 1946 (age 79–80) (Yazzie Johnson); Oakland, California (Gail Bird); Winslow, Arizona (Yazzie Johnson)

Gail Bird and Yazzie Johnson are Southwest American Indian artists known for their innovative jewelry partnership that has led to unique creations using stone and metalwork which blends both contemporary and prehistoric design motifs. Bird and Johnson have been crafting jewelry together since 1972, with Bird designing the pieces and Johnson leading on fabrication and metalwork.

== Early life and education ==
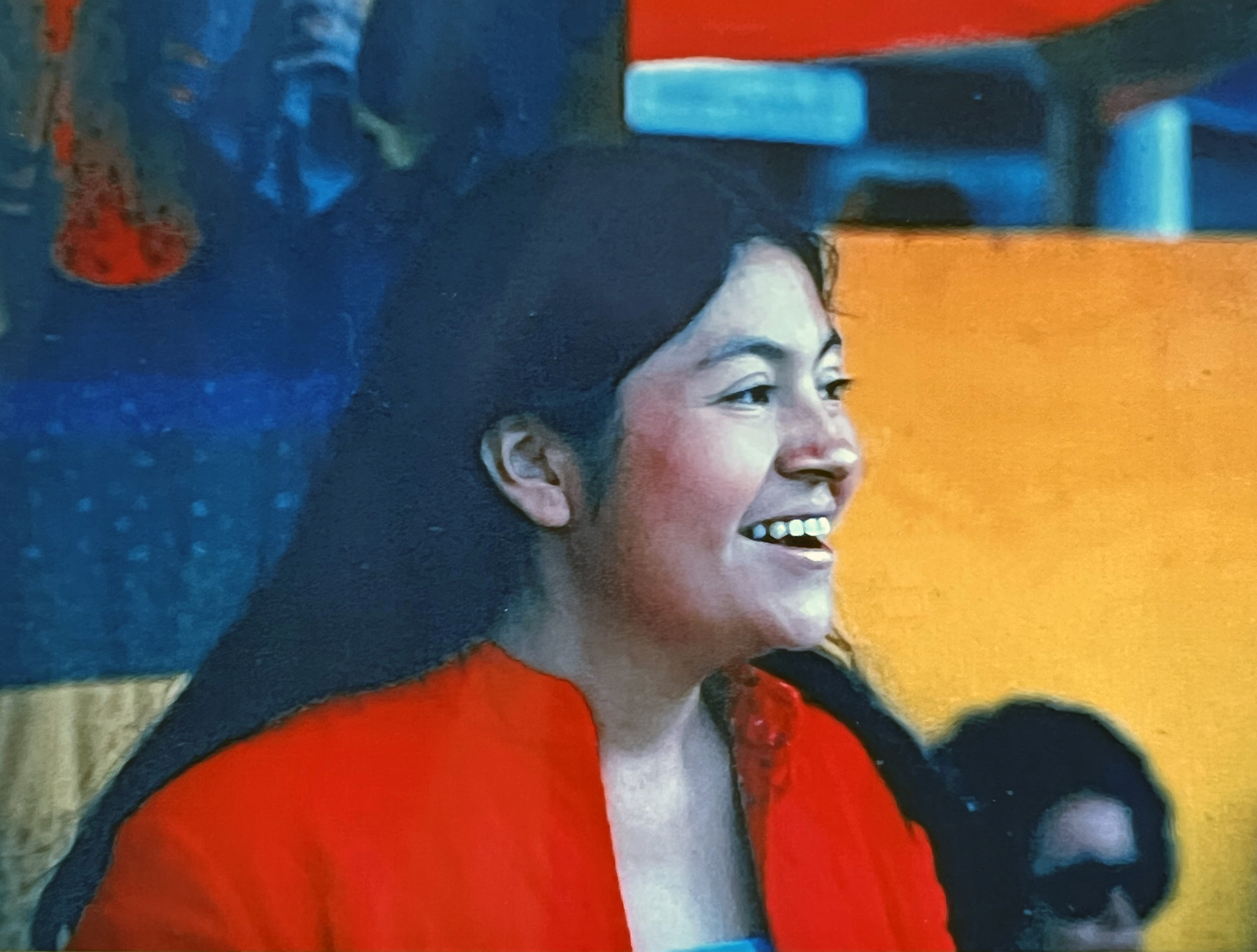
Southwest American Indian jewelry artist, Gail Bird, in 1979.

=== Gail Bird ===
Gail Bird was born in 1949 at Oakland, California. Her father, Tony Bird, was from Santo Domingo Pueblo and her mother, Andrea, was from Laguna Pueblo. Tony worked for the Southern Pacific Railroad and her mother worked for the Bureau of Indian Affairs Inter-Mountain Indian School in Brigham City, Utah. She and Yazzie Johnson had known each other since childhood. After high school, Bird studied at University of California Berkeley and the University of Colorado at Boulder.

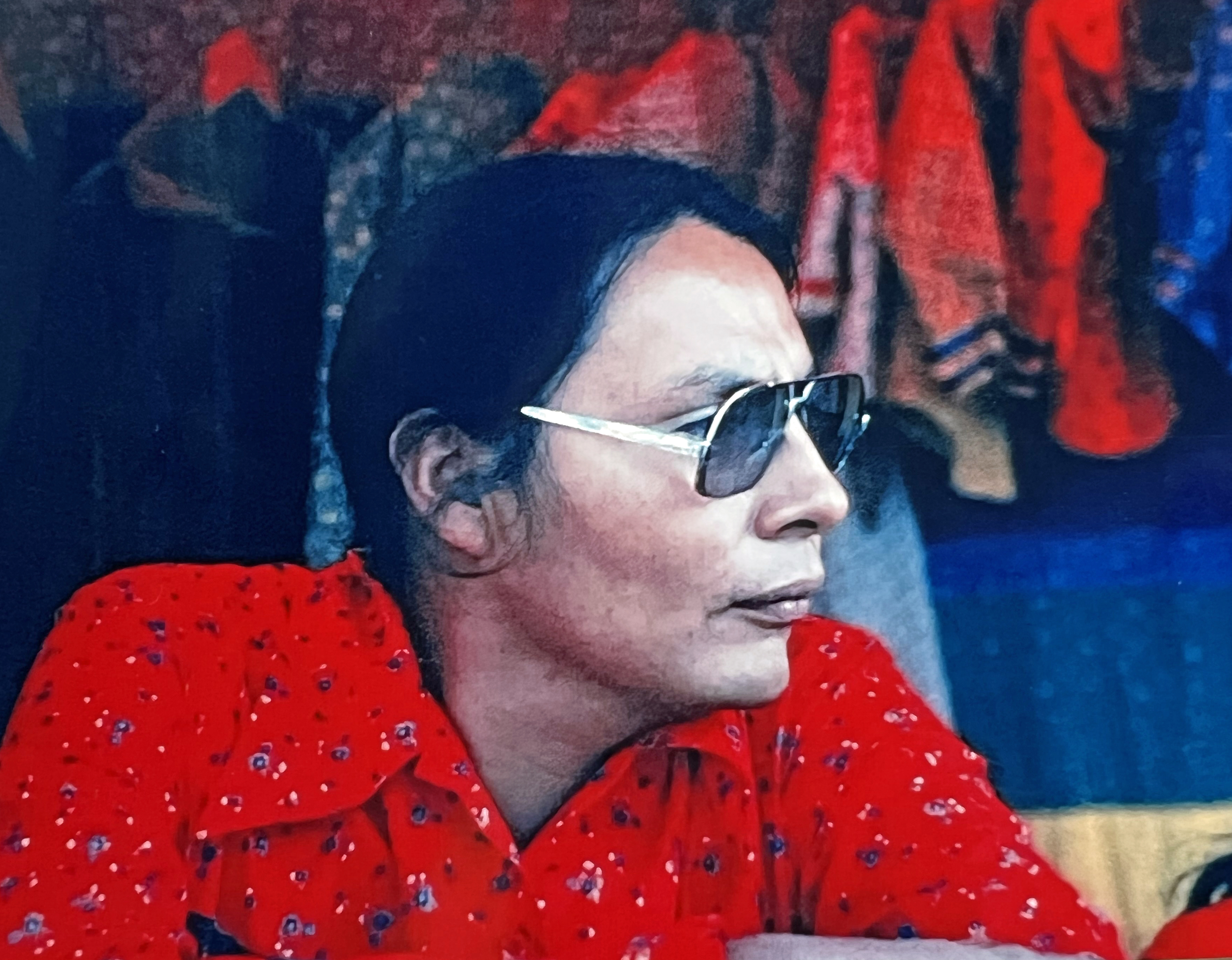
Southwest American Indian jewelry artist, Yazzie Johnson, in 1979.

=== Yazzie Johnson ===
Yazzie Johnson was born in 1946 in Winslow, Arizona. His father, Matthew Johnson, was from Leupp, Arizona and his mother, Marilyn, was from Sanostee, New Mexico, both from the Navajo Nation. Both his parents worked for the Bureau of Indian Affairs Inter-Mountain Indian School in Brigham City, Utah where he met Gail Bird at age fourteen. He was influenced at an early age by one of the teachers at the School, Dooley D. Shorty, who was a silversmith (and had been a Navajo Code Talker in World War II). Johnson enlisted in the U. S. Army in 1966 and served in Germany and Vietnam. He studied at University of California Berkeley and the University of Colorado at Boulder.

== History ==
The artists have known each other since they were children and have collaborated in designing and fabricating jewelry since 1972. Bird and Johnson use non-traditional stones, often resembling landscapes and uncommon juxtapositions of materials like pearls, opals and dinosaur bone. They are inspired by prehistoric pictographs and petroglyph sites.

To many, they are best known for the thematic belts they make each year (since 1979) for the Southwestern Association for Indian Arts (SWAIA) Santa Fe Indian Market, but they also design earrings, bracelets, rings and necklaces which are shown in galleries and museums across the country. In 1981 they won Best of Show for such a belt at the Santa Fe Indian Market. Bird and Johnson emphasize, “We see our jewelry as being very traditional in nature. But we carry the traditions further. The stones we use are of a wider variety than those usually associated with Indian jewelry. The symbols and narrative on our pieces are expansions of traditional symbols and stories.”

Southwest Native American art dealer and book author Martha Hopkins Lanman Struever held the first gallery show for Bird and Johnson in Chicago in 1978. Struever describes their work, “The jewelry they produce is distinct from the work of other American Indian jewelers. Their pieces are frequently dramatic and always wearable. By seeking out stones of unusual color and surface pattern or pearls of various shapes and hues, then juxtaposing them in original compositions, they have created a unique style. After years of visiting prehistoric pictograph and petroglyph sites, Gail and Yazzie realized that these ancient peoples had developed a distinctive set of designs, from which they have drawn much inspiration. Over their career of more than three decades, Gail and Yazzie have developed a body of work that is both distinctly their own and continuously evolving.”

In 1981, Bird and Johnson won Best of Show at the Santa Fe Indian Market. More recently, they have become famous for their necklaces which often carry designs on the reverse side of bezel-set stones which reflect symbols that are personalized to the intended wearer. They use an overlay technique, which they describe as "underlay", that was inspired by Charles Loloma's stone inlay designs on the interior sides of rings and bracelets. In 1991, they began to incorporate carved stone into their work.

The couple live and work in northern New Mexico.

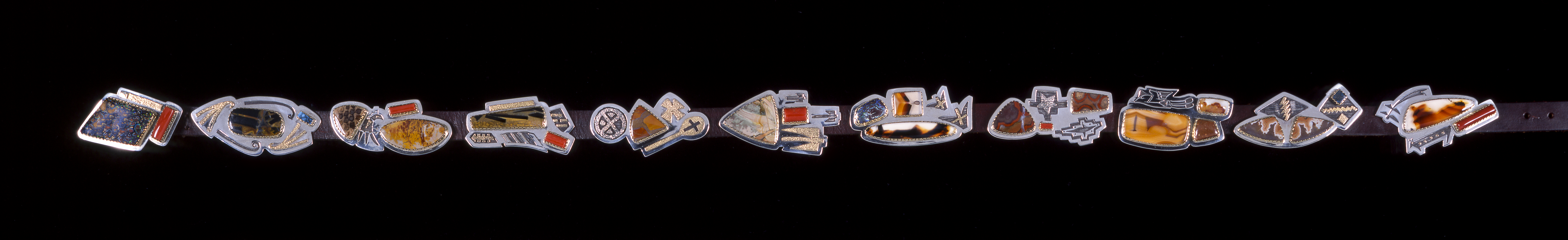
All Things Hopi Belt, 2005, by Gail Bird and Yazzie Johnson in the Heard Museum Collection, Phoenix, Arizona.

The jewelry works of Bird and Johnson are included in the permanent collections of several museums, including the British Museum, the Museum of Arts and Design, the National Museum of Scotland and the Smithsonian Institution.

In 2022, the Heard Museum acquired one of the largest and most complex pieces every made by the artists, entitled All Things Hopi Belt. The belt was made in 2005 for Martha Hopkins Lanman Struever, a scholar of Hopi art and culture. The buckle reverse of a Hopi design of a hand with a bracelet refers to Struever's love of jewelry. The belt is silver with 18k gold applique and embellished with Yowah opals, coral, turquoise, petrified pinecone and various jaspers and agates (see photo).

In 2007 the book “Shared Images: The Innovative Jewelry of Yazzie Johnson and Gail Bird” was written about Johnson and Bird's jewelry work.

== Collections ==
Bird and Johnson's work is held in numerous collections including the Smithsonian Institution, the Heard Museum, the National Museum of the American Indian, the Museum of Fine Arts Boston, Eddie Basha Collection, among others.

== See also ==
- List of Native American artists
- Native American jewelry
- Visual arts by indigenous peoples of the Americas
