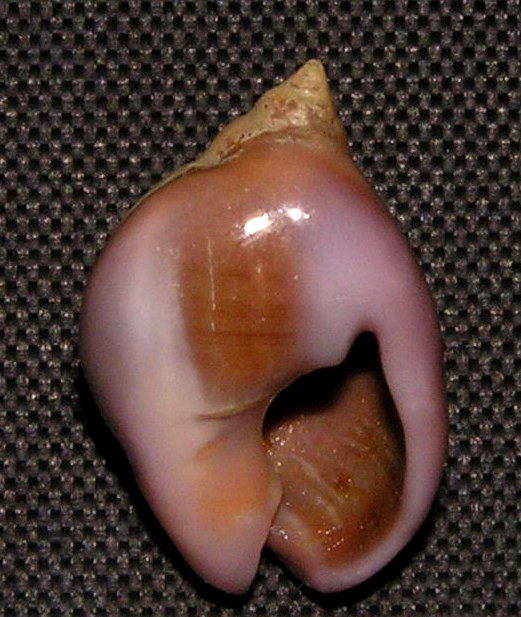
- Apertural view of a shell of Tritia gibbosula

Scientific classification
- Kingdom: Animalia
- Phylum: Mollusca
- Class: Gastropoda
- Subclass: Caenogastropoda
- Order: Neogastropoda
- Family: Nassariidae
- Subfamily: Nassariinae
- Genus: Tritia
- Species: T. gibbosula

Binomial name
- Tritia gibbosula (Linnaeus, 1758)

Synonyms
- list of synonyms: Arcularia gibbosula (Linnaeus, 1758); Arcularia gibbosula obscura Pallary, 1913; Arcularia gibbosula var. minor Pallary, 1912; Arcularia gibbosula var. obscura Pallary, 1912; Buccinum gibbosulum Linnaeus, 1758 (original combination); Cassis callosa Röding, 1798; Cassis callosus Röding, 1798; Nassa gibbosula (Linnaeus, 1758); Nassa gibbosula var. syriaca Puton, 1856; Nassarius gibbosulus (Linnaeus, 1758); Nassarius (Plicarcularia) gibbosulus (Linnaeus, 1758); Sphaeronassa irregularis Locard, 1892 (dubious synonym)

= Tritia gibbosula =

Species of gastropod

Tritia gibbosula, common name the swollen nassa, is a species of sea snail, a marine gastropod mollusc in the family Nassariidae, the Nassa mud snails or dog whelks.

== Description ==
The length of the shell varies between 15 mm and 20 mm.

The thick shell is smooth, ovate, somewhat gibbous upon the back of the body whorl, flattened and widened upon the sides. The spire is short and acute. It is formed of five or six whorls. The aperture is ovate, smooth and white. The interior of the cavity is brown. The outer lip is margined without, smooth within, joining towards the top a large polished callosity, by which the columella and inferior surface of the whorls are entirely covered. The color is olive or of a brown fawn-color and ash, sprinkled with spots or clearer undulated lines. Sometimes one or two transverse brown bands surround the body whorl. The edge of the callosity is always of a more or less deep orange color.

== Distribution ==
This species occurs in the Eastern Mediterranean Sea off Greece, Lebanon, Syria and Egypt.

== Use in prehistory ==
The oldest known jewelry in the world consists of two perforated beads made from shells of this species. These were discovered at Skhul in Israel, and were recently dated to between 100,000 and 135,000 years ago. Similar ornaments (some made from Nassarius kraussianus and the bittersweet clam Glycymeris nummaria as well as Nassarius gibbosulus) have been discovered at a number of Middle Paleolithic sites and are considered a key piece of evidence for the theory that early anatomically modern humans in Africa and the Levant were more culturally sophisticated than had previously been thought. In some cases the shells have been transported a considerable distance from the species' natural habitat. One example is the site of Oued Djebbana, near Bir el-Ater in Algeria, for example, where an N. gibbosulus bead has been found; this site was at least 190 km away from the sea at the time the shell was used there.
