= Phillip Sekaquaptewa =

Hopi artist and silversmith (1948–2003)

- Born: May 5, 1948
- Died: January 21, 2003 (aged 54)

Phillip Sekaquaptewa (May 5, 1948 – January 21, 2003) was a Hopi artist and silversmith in Hopi silver overlay and stone inlay, featuring the lapidary genres of commesso and intarsia. Sekaquaptewa used colorful stones and shell for his Hopi silver overlay, not only plain silver decorated with chisel strokes on black oxide surfaces, a Hopi-signature technique known as matting.

He was born in 1948 in a traditional Hopi village on Second Mesa on the Hopi Reservation, located in Northern Arizona. He learned his cultural heritage as a resident Hopi and then began silversmithing, taking up the tools after his uncle, Emory. Sekaquaptewa is internationally known for his contemporary and idiosyncratic designs which incorporate traditional Hopi pottery designs with contemporary flush stonework and inlay of bone and shell in blocky, masculine style. He does other styles as well, but the rectangular-themed composite rugged silver/stonework is his artistic signature and makes his work instantly recognizable to anyone who has encountered it before, not only experts. Sekaquaptewa died of cancer on January 21, 2003.

== Career ==
Sekaquaptewa was a 1973 graduate of Northern Arizona University with a bachelor of Fine Arts degree and a master's degree from the University of Arizona, 1974. He gained interest in the field of jewelry from his father Wayne and from his uncle Emory Sekaquaptewa, the linguist and silversmith as well, who co-founded the Hopi Gallery on the Third Mesa, Arizona. In the early 1970s he trained in the art of traditional silver overlay jewelry at Hopicrafts, a business owned by his father and uncle Emory. Sekaquaptewa won awards for his unique silver designs at the most prestigious American Indian Art competitions in the U.S., including Red Earth, Oklahoma City, Santa Fe Indian Market, Santa Fe, New Mexico, The Hopi Show, Museum of Northern Arizona in Flagstaff, Heard Museum Indian Fair in Phoenix, Arizona, Indian Ceremonial, held annually in Gallup, New Mexico, and many others. His work has also been published and featured in Southwest Art, American Indian Art, Native Peoples' Magazine, Beyond Tradition, and is described in a book by Jerry Jacka titled Art of the Hopi, the definitive guide to silversmiths, weavers, potters, and kachina doll-makers of the Hopi Tribe, also authored by Jacka, Magazine of the Southwest, and several times in Arizona Highways magazine. During the height of the Navajo-Hopi Land Dispute, he did political cartoons for the Hopi weekly newspaper Qua 'Toqti.

== Art and residence ==
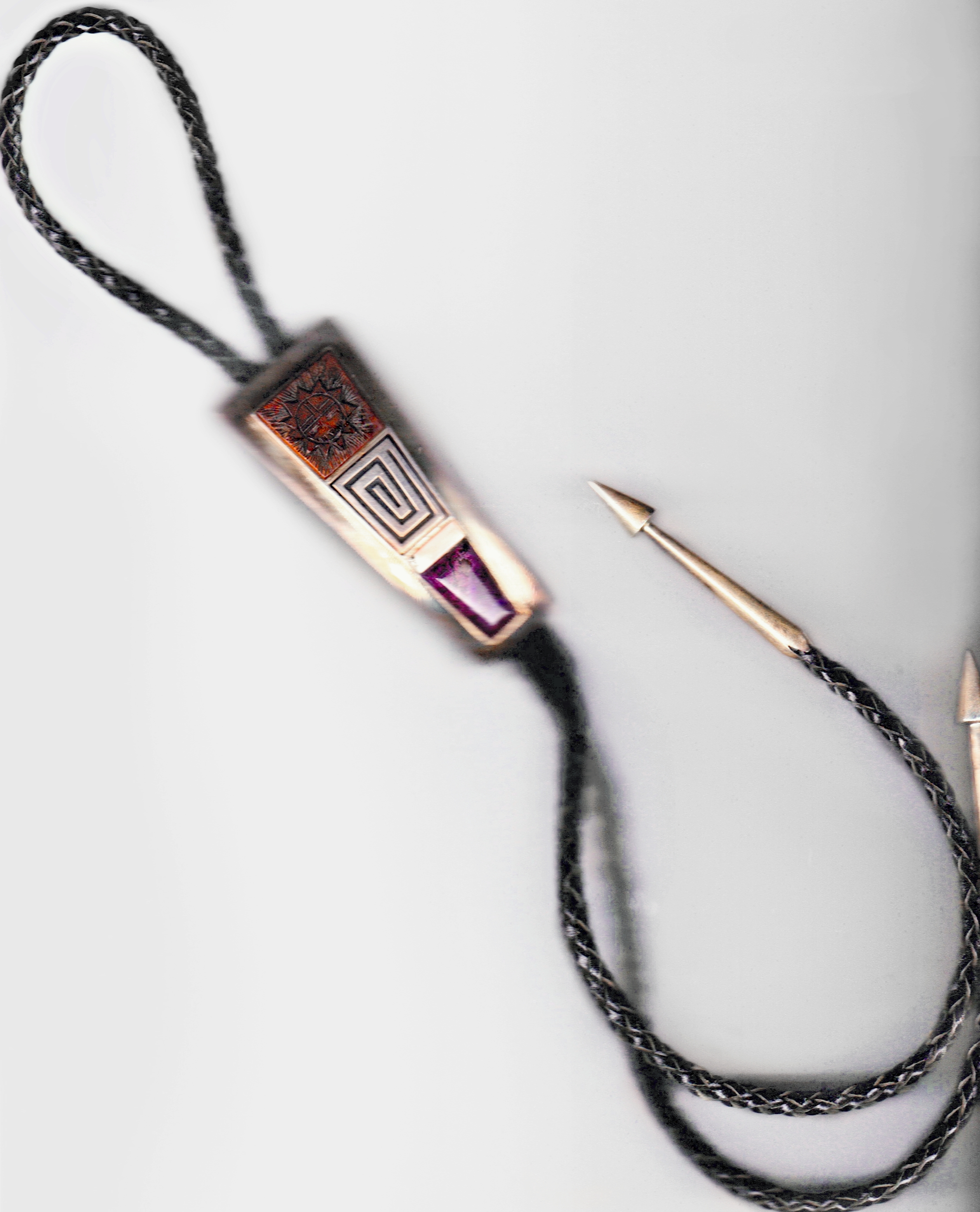
Bolo tie circa 1988. Private collection of Hopi silver overlay of Marek Wojciech Ługowski (Lugowski)

Sekaquaptewa used a unique combination of traditional silver or gold overlay with contemporary design of his own. Combined, his jewelry comprises stylized or preserved traditional Hopi pottery motifs, as well as lapidary texture and color inserted through the use of semi-precious stones and abalone shell. Using stone and shell is unusual for Hopi silversmiths, and is more typical of the Zuni and other Pueblo people, as well as the ethnographically disjoint Diné (Navajo) silversmiths—usually turquoise. In sum, the main features are sterling silver, stones, and contemporary design of his authorship, all applied in a synthetic blend as new Hopi jewelry.

Sekaquaptewa resided at the village of Sipaulovi (or Supawlavi) on Second Mesa in Northern Arizona, and worked at his Weseoma Studio. He lived with his family: daughter Caroline, son Wayne, and two family dogs Drexler and Bambi. He assiduously attended the children's sporting events, practiced golf extensively, and was an accomplished fly-fishing sports fisherman. He was a member of the Eagle clan, as well as on his distaff side, the Snake clan. As befits a resident Hopi, in that obligatory capacity Sekaquaptewa participated actively in observances obligatory under the traditional Hopi calendar, which comprises various public and restricted attendance ceremonies.

Sekaquaptewa worked towards the preservation of the Hopi language and the Hopi tradition, while funding his Nation and making a living by creating new contemporary art uniquely informed by his heritage, silver apprenticeship, artistic creativity, and academic training.

== Major exhibitions ==
- The Hopi Show, Museum of Northern Arizona in Flagstaff
- annual: Heard Museum Indian Fair, Phoenix
- annual: Indian Ceremonial, Gallup
- annual: Santa Fe Indian Market, Santa Fe, New Mexico

== Bibliography ==
- Jacka, Jerry: Art of the Hopi , Flagstaff, Arizona: Northland Publishers, 1998. (link to WorldCat entry)
- Mori, John & Mori, Joyce: Hopi silversmithing, Los Angeles: Southwest Museum, 1971. (link to WorldCat entry)

== See also ==
- Mosaics as a popular craft
- Native American jewelry
