= Native American jewelry =

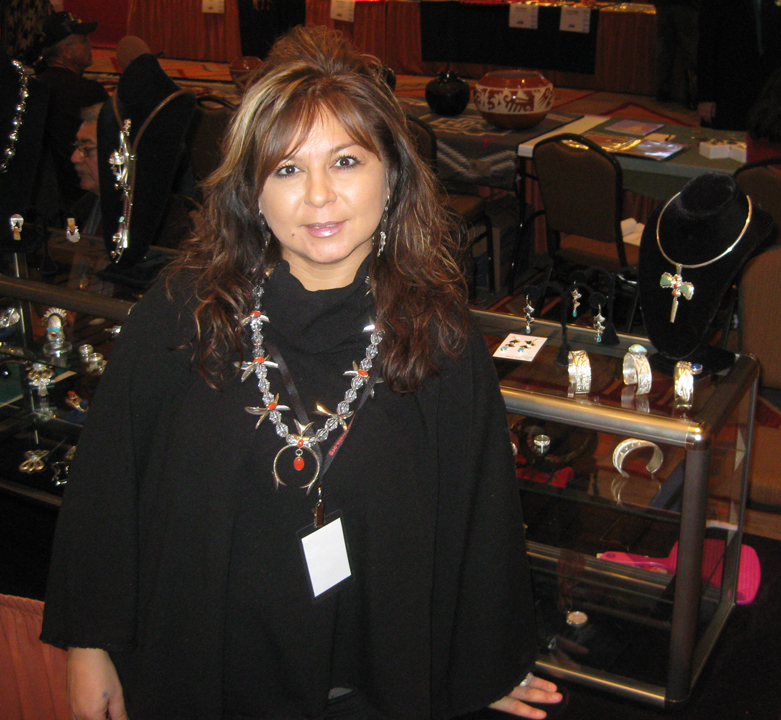
Wanesia Spry Misquadace (Fond du Lac Ojibwe), jeweler and birch bark biter, 2011

Native American jewelry refers to items of personal adornment, whether for personal use, sale or as art; examples of which include necklaces, earrings, bracelets, rings and pins, as well as ketohs, wampum, and labrets, made by one of the Indigenous peoples of the United States. Native American jewelry normally reflects the cultural diversity and history of its makers, but tribal groups have often borrowed and copied designs and methods from other, neighboring tribes or nations with which they had trade, and this practice continues today. Native American tribes continue to develop distinct aesthetics rooted in their personal artistic visions and cultural traditions. Artists may create jewelry for adornment, ceremonies, and display, or for sale or trade. Lois Sherr Dubin writes, "[i]n the absence of written languages, adornment became an important element of Indian communication, conveying many levels of information." Later, jewelry and personal adornment "...signaled resistance to assimilation. It remains a major statement of tribal and individual identity."

Native American jewelry can be made from naturally occurring materials such as various metals, hardwoods, vegetal fibers, or precious and semi-precious gemstones; animal materials such as teeth, bones and hide; or man-made materials like beadwork and quillwork. Metalsmiths, beaders, carvers, and lapidaries combine these materials to create jewelry. Contemporary Native American jewelry ranges from hand-quarried and processed stones and shells to computer-fabricated steel and titanium jewelry.

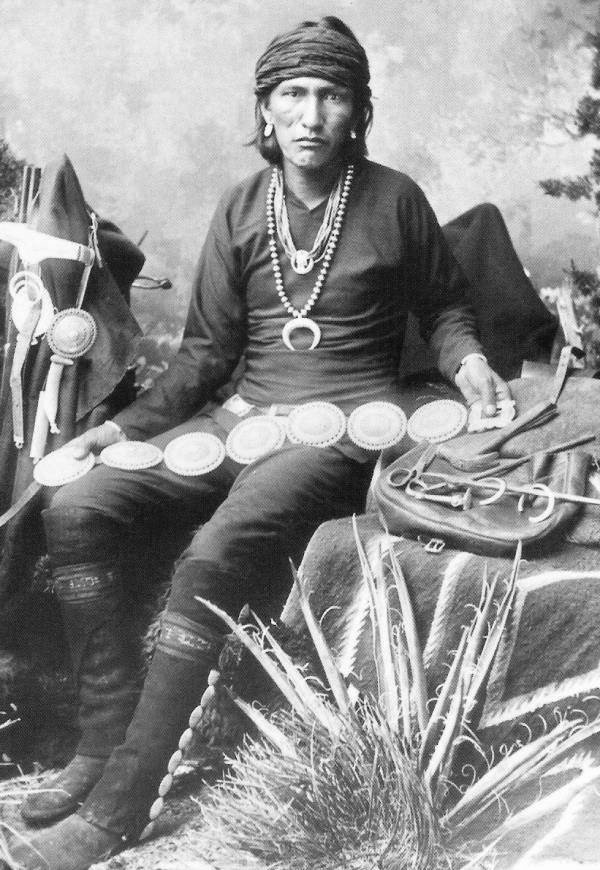
Bai-De-Schluch-A-Ichin or Be-Ich-Schluck-Ich-In-Et-Tzuzzigi (Slender Silversmith) "Metal Beater," Navajo silversmith, photo by George Ben Wittick, 1883

== Origins ==
Jewelry in the Americas has an ancient history. The earliest known examples of North American jewelry are four bone earrings found at the Mead Site, near Fairbanks, Alaska that date back 12,000 years. Beginning as far back as 8800 BCE, Paleo-Indians in the American Southwest drilled and shaped multicolored stones and shells into beads and pendants. Olivella shell beads, dating from 6000 BCE, were found in Nevada; bone, antler, and possibly marine shell beads from 7000 BCE were found in Russell Cave in Alabama; copper jewelry was traded from Lake Superior beginning in 3000 BCE; and stone beads were carved in Poverty Point in Louisiana in 1500 BCE.

Necklaces of heishe beads, or shells ground into flat discs, have been discovered in ancient ruins. Remnants of seashells that were used to make beads were also found. Oyster shell, mother of pearl, abalone, conch, and clam shells have been important trade items in the Southwest for over a thousand years.

Native beadwork continued to advance in the pre-Columbian era. Beads were made from hand-ground and filed turquoise, coral, and shell. Carved wood, animal bones, claws, and teeth were made into beads, which were then sewn onto clothing, or strung into necklaces. Turquoise is one of the dominant materials of Southwestern Native American jewelry. Thousands of pieces were found in the Ancestral Pueblo sites at Chaco Canyon. Some turquoise mines date back to Precontact times, and Ancestral Pueblo peoples traded the turquoise with Mesoamericans. Some turquoise found in southern Arizona dates back to 200 BCE.

== Great Plains ==
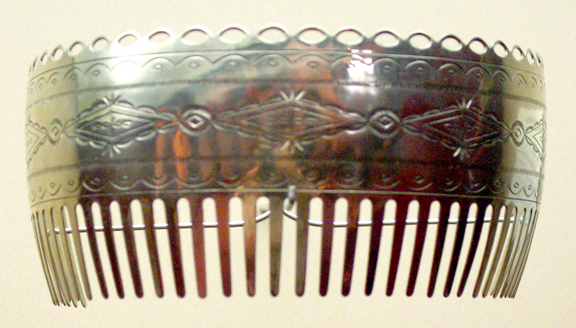
Nickel silver comb by Bruce Caesar (Pawnee/Meskwaki, 1984) Oklahoma History Center

Plains Indians are most well known for their beadwork. Beads on the Great Plains date back to at least to 8800 BCE, when a circular, incised lignite bead was left at the Lindenmeier site in Colorado. Shells such as marginella and olivella shells were traded from the Gulf of Mexico and the coasts of California into the Plains since 100 CE. Mussel shell gorgets, dentalia, and abalone were prized trade items for jewelry.

Bones provided material for beads as well, especially long, cylindrical beads called hair pipes, which were extremely popular from 1880 to 1910 and are still are very common in powwow regalia today. These are used in chokers, breastplates, earrings, and necklaces worn by women and men, and in ceremonial headdresses as well.

Porcupine quillwork is a traditional embellishment for textiles on the Northern Plains, but quillwork is also used in creating bracelets, earrings, hatbands, belt buckles, headdresses, hair roaches, and hairclips, as well as umbilical cord fetishes. Glass trade beads were first introduced to the Great Plains as early as 1700 and were used in decoration in a manner similar to quillwork, but they never fully replaced it. The Lakota became particularly adept at glass bead work, especially the members of the Standing Rock Sioux Tribe in the Western Dakotas. Several award-winning quillworkers are active in the art world today, such as Joyce Growing Thunder Fogarty (Assiniboine-Sioux).

Metal jewelry came to the Plains through Spanish and Mexican metalsmiths and trade with tribes from other regions. Southern Plains Native Americans adopted metalsmithing in the 1820s. They typically cut, stamped, and cold hammered German silver, a nickel alloy. Plains men adopted metal pectorals and armbands. In the late 19th and early 20th centuries, members of the Native American Church revealed their membership to others through pins with emblems of peyote buttons, water bird, and other religious symbols. Bruce Caesar (Meskwaki/Pawnee) is one of the most prolific Southern Plains metalsmiths active today and was awarded the NEA's National Heritage Fellowship in 1998. US Senator Ben Nighthorse Campbell (Northern Cheyenne descent) is an accomplished silversmith.

== Northeastern Woodlands ==
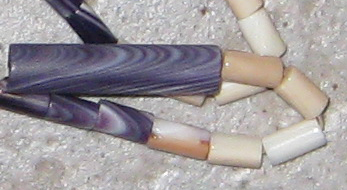
Contemporary wampum beads made Elizabeth James-Perry (Wampanoag/Eastern Cherokee)

Before European contact and at least 1,500 years ago indigenous peoples of the Northeastern Woodlands produced barrel-shaped and discoidal shell beads, as well as perforated small whole shells. The earliest beads are larger when compared to later beads and those of wampum, with hand drilled holes. The use of the more slender iron drills much improved drilling.

"Wampum" is a Wampanoag word referring to the white shells of the channeled whelk shell. The term now refers to both those and the purple beads from quahog clamshells. Wampum workshops were located among the Narragansett tribe, an Algonquian people located along the southern New England coast. The Narragansett tribal bead makers were buried with wampum supplies and tools to finish work in progress in the afterlife. Wampum was highly sought as a trade good throughout the Eastern Woodlands, including the Great Lakes region.

Narragansett favored teardrop-shaped shell pendants, and the claw pendants made of purple shell were worn by Iroquois in the Hudson Valley, around the Connecticut River. The Seneca and Munsee made shell pendants with drilled columns, decorated with a circular shell called a runtee. Whelk shells were carved into bird, turtle, fish, and other shaped pendants, as well as ear spools.

Carved stone pendants in the Northeastern Woodlands date back as far as the Hopewell tradition from 1—400 CE. Bird motifs were common, ranging from the stylized heads of raptors to ducks. Carved shells and incised animal teeth, especially bear teeth, have been popular for pendants. Historically, pearls are incorporated into necklace and bear teeth have been inlaid with pearls. Seneca and other Iroquois carved small pendants with human faces, which were believed to be protective amulets, from bone, wood, and stone, including catlinite.

Haudenosaunee artists have carved ornamental hair combs from antlers, often from moose, since 2000 BCE. The combs are topped with anthropomorphic or zoomorphic imagery. These became more elaborate after the introduction of metal knives from Europe in the late 16th and 17th centuries.

In the Northeast Woodlands and Great Lakes regions, rectangular gorgets have been carved from slate and other stones, dating back to the late archaic period.

Copper was worked in precontact times, but Europeans introduced silversmithing to the northeast in the mid-17th century. Today several Iroquois silversmiths are active. German silver is more popular among Great Lakes silversmiths.

== Northwest Coast ==
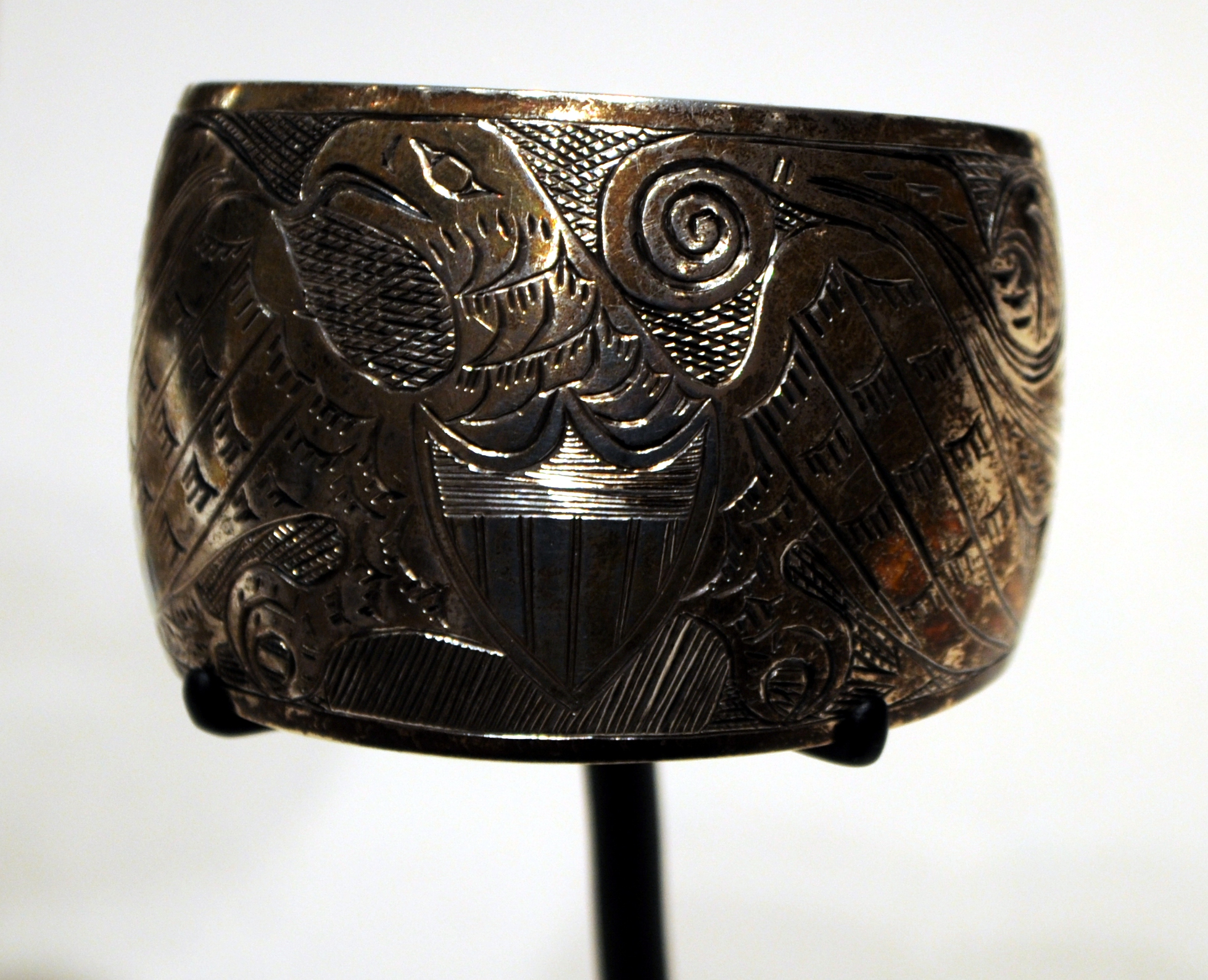
Haida silver bracelet featuring an American eagle, c. 1900, Seattle Art Museum

In the past, walrus ivory was an important material for carving bracelets and other items. In the 1820s, a major argillite quarry was discovered on Haida Gwaii, and this stone proved easier to carve than ivory or bone and was adopted as a carving material. Venetian glass seed beads were introduced in great numbers by Russian traders in the late 18th century, as part of the fur trade. Red and amber were the most popular colors, followed by blue. Historical Chinese coins with defenestrated section were strung as beads.

Copper, initially traded from tribes near the Coppermine River in the interior, was worked into jewelry even before European contact. Later, silver and gold became popular materials for jewelry. Bracelets in particular are hammered and then carved with heraldic or mythic designs, and given away at potlatches. Northwest Coast jewelers increasingly use repoussé techniques in metalworking. Charles Edenshaw (Haida, 1839–1920) and Bill Reid (Haida, 1920–1998) were highly influential Northwest Coast jewelers.

Dentalium shells have been traditional beads, used in necklaces, earrings, and other adornment. Kwakwaka'wakw and Nuu-chah-nulth people used to harvest the shell from the waters off Vancouver Island, but that stock is depleted and today most dentalia are harvested from southeast Asia. Abalone shell provides beads and jewelry. High-ranking women traditionally wore large abalone shell earrings.

Today Haida and Tlingit basket weavers often create miniature red cedar (Thuja plicata), yellow cedar, and spruce root baskets to be worn as pendants or earrings.

== Southeastern Woodlands ==
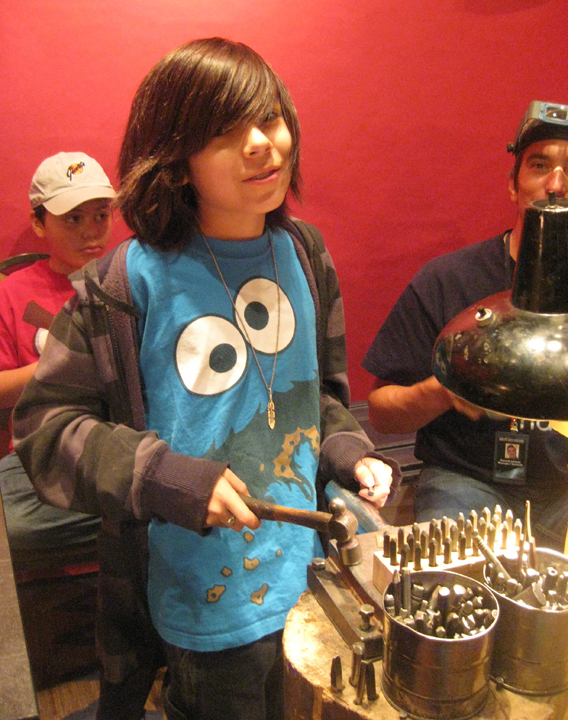
Young Seminole jeweler, SWAIA Winter Market, 2011

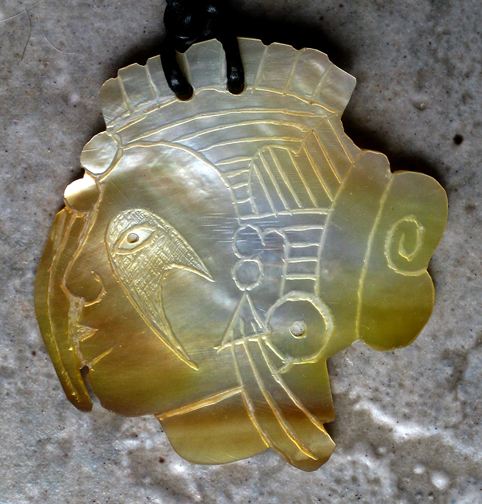
Contemporary Shell gorget carved by Bennie Pokemire (Eastern Band Cherokee)

In the Mississippian culture of the Southeast, dating from 800 BCE to 1500 CE, clay, stone, and pearl beads were worn. Shell gorgets were incised with bold imagery from the Southeastern Ceremonial Complex. These are still carved today by several Muscogee, Chickasaw, and Cherokee jewelers. Long-nosed god maskettes were made from bone, copper and marine shells. These are small shield-shaped faces with squared-off foreheads, circular eyes, and large noses of various lengths. They are often shown on SECC representations of falcon impersonators as ear ornaments. Before Europeans brought glass beads to the southeast in the 16th century, pearls and Job's tears were popular materials for necklaces. Ear spools of stone, or sometimes wood overlaid with copper foil, were popular, and many have been found at Spiro Mounds from 1100 to 1400 CE.

European contact introduced glass beads and silversmithing technology. Silver and brass armbands and gorgets became popular among Southeastern men in the 18th and 19th centuries. Sequoyah was an 18th/19th-century Cherokee silversmith. Until the 19th century, Choctaw men wore horsehair collars when playing stickball. Choctaw women's dance regalia incorporates ornamental silver combs and openwork beaded collars. Caddo women wear hourglass-shaped hair ornaments, called dush-tohs when dancing.

== Southwest ==
Heishe necklaces have been made by several southwest tribes since ancient times. The word "heishe" comes from the Santo Domingo word for "shell." A single heishe is a rolled bead of shell, turquoise, or coral, which is cut very thin. Shells used for heishe included mother-of-pearl, spiny oyster, abalone, coral, conch and clam. Tiny, thin heishe was strung together by the Santo Domingo to create necklaces, which were important trade items.

Silversmiths dominate the production of jewelry centered in the Four Corners region of the American Southwest. Early in the 1800s, Spanish and, later, Mexican, silver buttons, bridles, etc. became available in what is now Arizona, Colorado, New Mexico and Utah through acquisition and trade. Navajo (Diné) artists began working silver in the 1850s after learning the art from Mexican smiths. The Zuni, who admired the silver jewelry made by Navajo smiths, traded livestock for instruction in working silver. By 1890, Zuni smiths had instructed the Hopi as well.

The centuries-old art of lapidary, preserved by clan and family tradition, remains an important element of design. Stone on stone mosaic inlay, channel inlay, cluster work, petite point, needle point, and natural cut or smoothed and polished cabochons fashioned from shells, coral, semi-precious and precious gems commonly decorate these works of art with blue or green turquoise being the most common and recognizable material used.

=== Apache ===
Both Apache men and women have traditionally worn a variety of jewelry, including earrings and bracelets with strung beads of shell and turquoise. Many bracelets and other jewelry are made of silver with turquoise inlays, and rings have been made from brass or silver. Apache women historically wore a number of necklaces simultaneously, from chokers to strung beads of abalone and other shells, turquoise, jet, stones, glass beads, and certain seeds, such as mountain laurel seeds, and even plant roots. Necklaces often feature abalone shell pendants. When trade beads became available from Europeans and European-Americas, Apache women began wearing several layers of string glass bead necklaces. Mirrors obtained from traders were also worn as pendants, or woven into vests and other clothing items.

Apache jewelers use virtually any color, but do tend toward traditional favorite color combinations, including black and white, red and yellow, or pale blue and dark blue. The beadwork of Plains tribes influenced eastern Apaches tribes. Even today, young Apache girls wear necklaces with scratching sticks and drinking tubes during their puberty ceremonies.

San Carlos Apache jewelers are known for their use of peridot, a green gemstone, in silver bolo ties, necklaces, earrings, and other jewelry.

=== Hopi ===
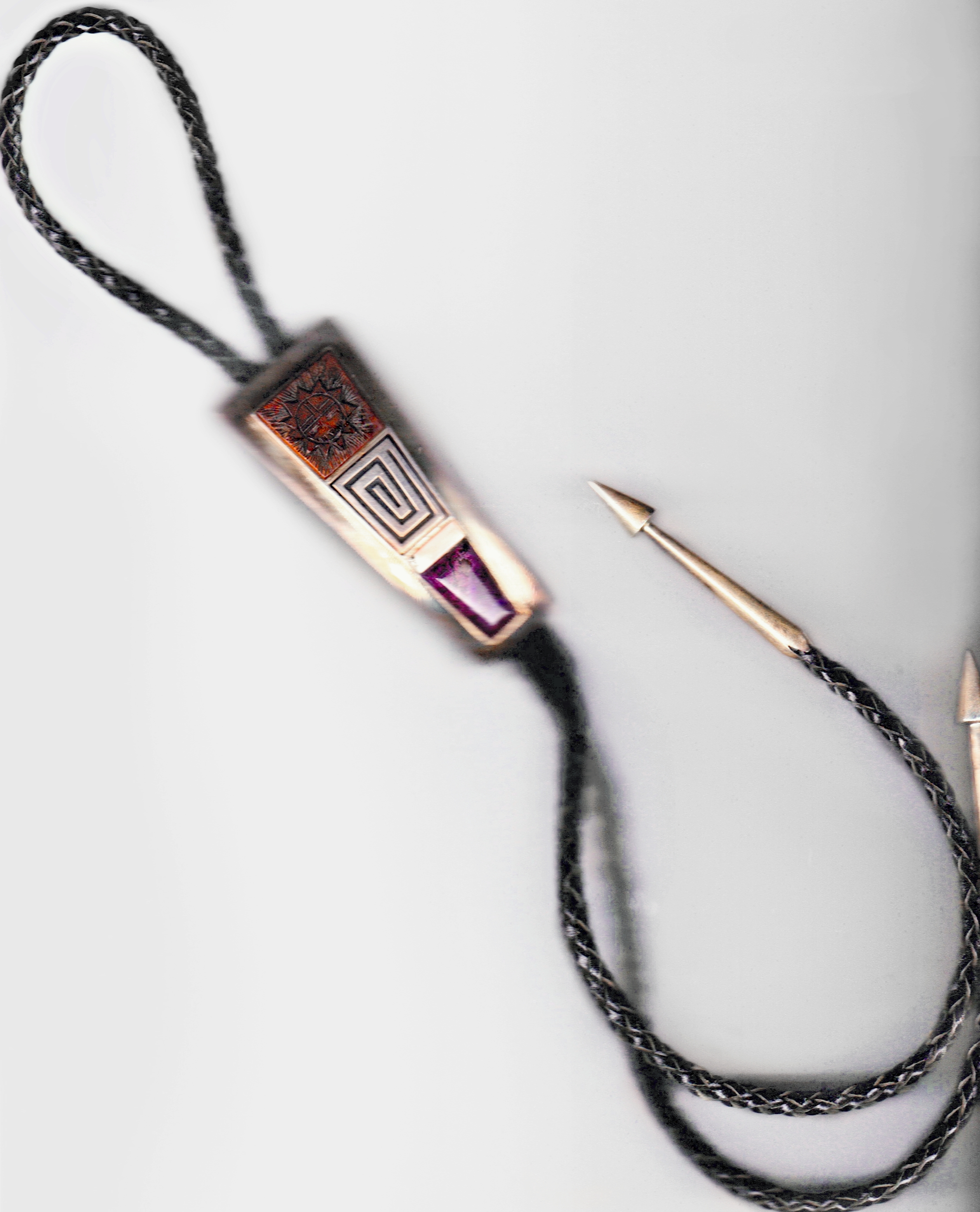
Phillip Sekaquaptewa's signature commesso bolo tie, circa 1988, contemporary Hopi silver overlay with stone and shell. At full magnification, note matting, characteristic minute, closely packed chisel strokes applied by the Hopi (and no one else) to the oxidized areas of the bottom silver sheet in overlay work.

Sikyatata became the first Hopi silversmith in 1898. Hopi Indian silversmiths today are known for their overlay technique used in silver jewelry designs. The scarcity of silver kept the primary jewelry components used by the Hopi to shell and stone until the 1930s and 1940s, and very few Hopi knew how to work silver.

In 1946, Willard Beatty, director of the Indian Education for the US Department of the Interior, saw an exhibit of Hopi art and was inspired to develop a silversmithing program for Hopi veterans of World War II. The veterans learned cutting, grinding and polishing, as well as die-stamping and sand-casting of stylized Hopi designs. The students then taught fellow tribesmen silversmithing, which they used to stylize traditional designs from the decorative patterns of old pottery and baskets.

The Museum of Northern Arizona encouraged the early silversmiths to develop their own style, distinct from neighboring tribes. Victor Coochwytewa was one of the most innovative jewelers - one who is often credited with adapting the overlay technique to Hopi jewelry, along with Paul Saufkie and Fred Kabotie. The Hopi Silvercraft Cooperative Guild was organized by these early students. Saufkie's son Lawrence continued making silver overlay jewelry for more than 60 years.

Overlay involves two layers of silver sheets. One sheet has the design etched into it, and then is soldered onto the second sheet with cut out designs. The background is made darker through oxidation, and the top layer is polished where the bottom layer of silver is allowed to oxidize. The top un-oxidized top layer is made into a cutout design, which allows the dark bottom layer to show through. This technique is still in use today in silver jewelry.

Hopi jeweler Charles Loloma (1921–1991) transformed mid-20th-century Native American jewelry by winning major awards with his work that incorporated new materials and techniques. Loloma was the first to use gold and to inlay multiple stones within a piece of jewelry, which completely changed the look of Hopi jewelry.

=== Navajo ===
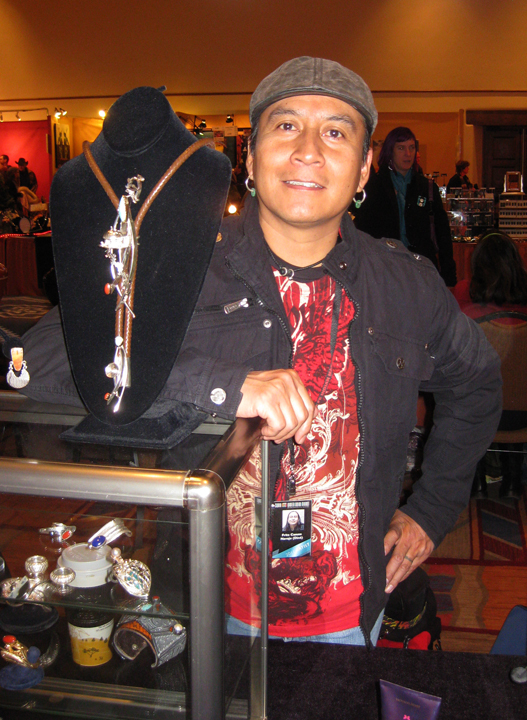
Fritz Casuse, Navajo jeweler, Santa Fe

The Navajo, or Diné, began working silver in the 19th century. Atsidi Sani, or "Old Smith" (c. 1828 – 1918), who may have been the first Navajo blacksmith and is credited as the first Navajo silversmith, learned to work silver from a Mexican smith as early as 1853. Navajo metalsmiths make buckles, bridles, buttons, rings, canteens, hollow beads, earrings, crescent-shaped pendants (called "najas"), bracelets, crosses, powder chargers, tobacco canteens, and disks, known as "conchas" or "conchos" - typically used to decorate belts - made from copper, steel, iron, and most commonly, silver.

Early Navajo smiths rocker-engraved, stamped, and filed designs into plain silver, melted from coins, flatware, and ingots obtained from European-American traders. Later, sheet silver and wire acquired from American settlers were also made into jewelry. The punches and stamps used by Mexican leather workers became the first tools used to create these decorations. Still later, railroad spurs, broken files, iron scraps and, later, piston rods became handmade stamps in the hands of these skilled artisans. As commercially-made stamps became available however, through contact with the larger American economy, they were also utilized. Several other traditional hand tools are employed, being relatively simple to construct.

The bellows consists of a skin bag about a foot long, held open with wooden hoops. It is provided with a valve and a nozzle. A forge, crucibles, an anvil, and tongs are used during the melting process. Molds, the matrix and die, cold chisels, scissors, pliers, files, awls, and emery paper also come into play. A soldering setup, consisting of a blowpipe and a torch made of oil-soaked rags used with borax, is manipulated by the smith. The silversmith uses a grinding stone, sandstone dust, and ashes for polishing the jewelry, and a salt called almogen is used for whitening. Navajo jewelers began sand casting silver around 1875; silver was melted and then poured into a mold, which would be carved from sandstone. When cooled and set, the piece normally required additional filing and smoothing. Cast jewelry was also occasionally engraved. Sterling silver jewelry was soldered, and surrounded by scrolls, beads, and leaf patterns.

Turquoise is closely associated with Navajo jewelry, but it was not until 1880 that the first turquoise was known to be set in silver. Turquoise became much more readily available in ensuing decades. Coral and other semi-precious stones came into common use around 1900.

One of the most important forms of Navajo and Southwestern Native American jewelry, is the Squash Blossom Necklace. Most are made of a string of plain round silver beads, interspersed with more stylized "squash blossoms", and feature a pendant, or "naja", hung from the center of the strand. The squash blossom beads are copied from the buttons which held together the pants worn by the Spanish, and later, Mexican caballeros. These buttons represent - and are modeled after - pomegranates. Their identification as "squash blossoms", which they closely resemble, is an understandable, and often repeated, error. The naja, which resembles an upside-down horseshoe, completes the design. Their origin can be found a continent, and several hundred years away, as a traditional part of Spanish horse halters.

In 1903, anthropologist Uriah Hollister wrote about the Navajo; he said, "Belts and necklaces of silver are their pride... They are so skillful and patient in hammering and shaping that a fairly good-shaped teaspoon is often made of a silver dollar without melting and casting."

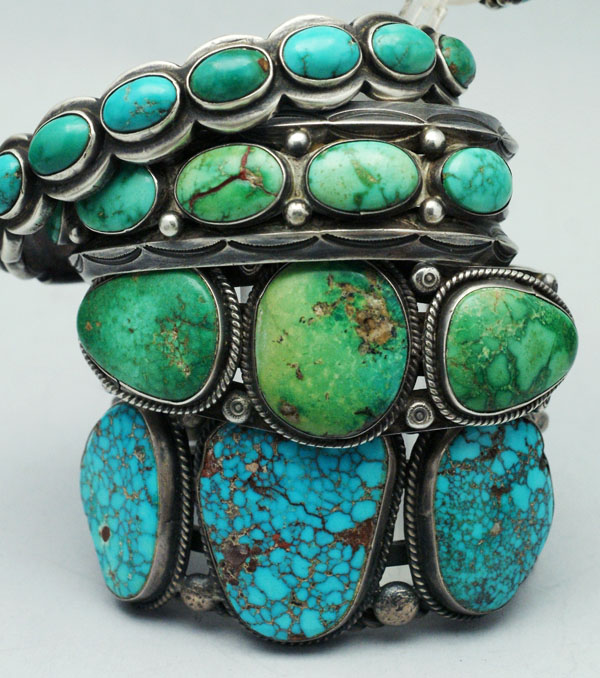
Navajo bracelets with turquoise

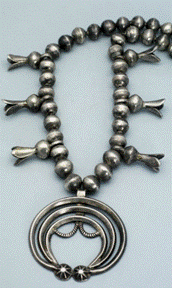
Navajo Squash Blossom Necklace

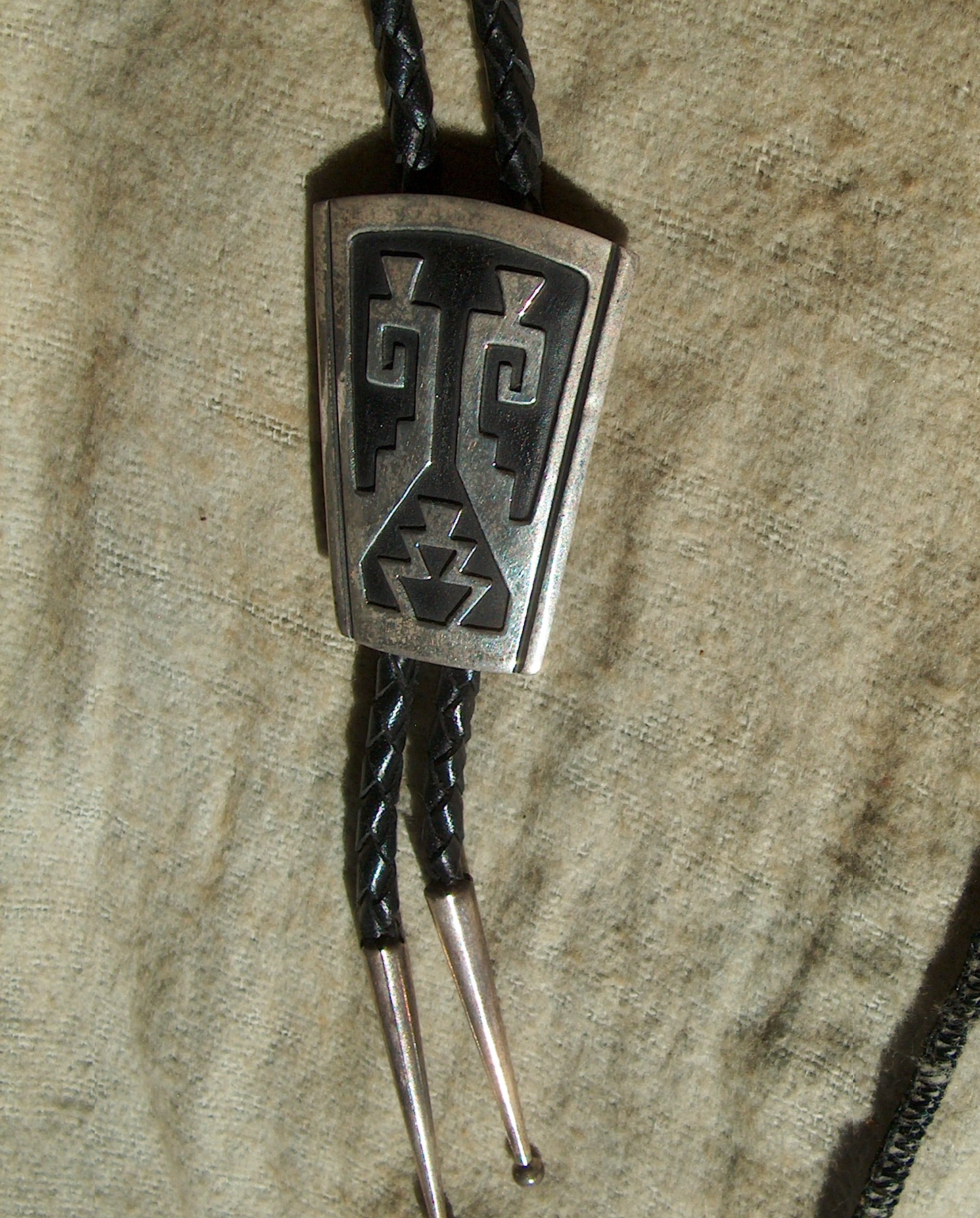
silver overlay bolo tie, by Tommy Singer, c. 1980s. This is an example of a Navajo copy of Hopi silver overlay technique, evident from the absence of matting on the black oxidized surfaces of the bottom silver sheet, or small, repeated, closely packed chisel strokes, very taxing on the silversmith, especially the eyes.

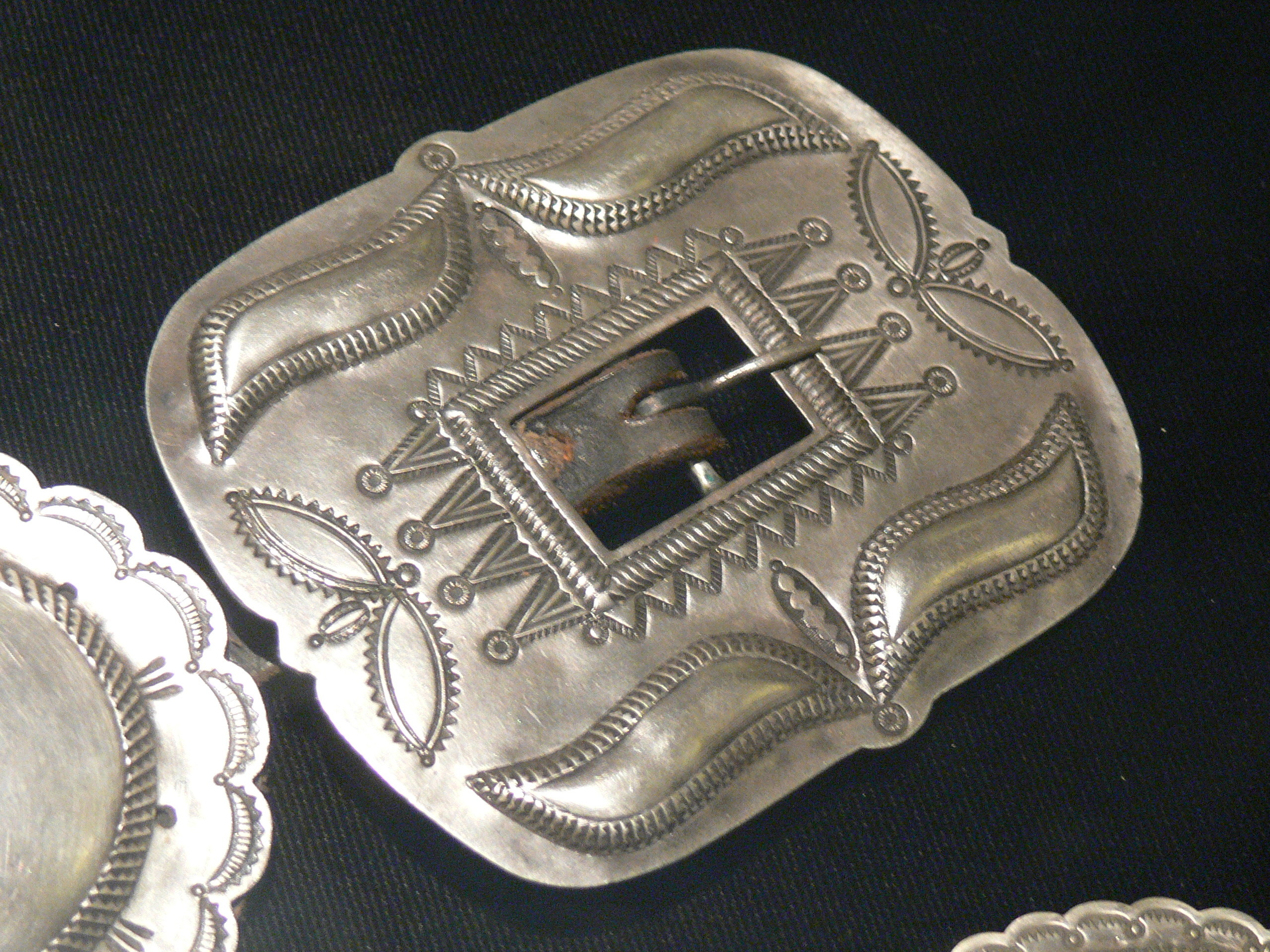
Silver Navajo belt buckle, Woolaroc

=== Kewa Pueblo ===
Kewa Pueblo, formerly known as Santo Domingo, is located on the Rio Grande and is particularly known for heishi necklaces, as well as a style of necklace consisting of tear-shaped, flat "tabs" strung on heishe shell or turquoise beads. The tabs were made from bone inset with a design in the traditional mosaic style, using bits of turquoise, jet and shell. These beautiful and colorful necklaces are also sometimes incorrectly identified as "Depression Jewelry", however their origin certainly predates the Great Depression, and they are still being made today in large quantities by Kewa artists.

Gail Bird is a contemporary Kewa jeweler, known for her collaborations with Navajo jeweler Yazzie Johnson and their themed concha belts.

=== Zuni ===
Zuni jewelry-making dates back to Ancestral Pueblo prehistory. Early Zuni lapidaries used stone and antler tools, wooden drills with flake stone, or cactus spine drillbits, as well as abrading tools made of wood and stone, sand for smoothing, and fiber cords for stringing.

With the exception of silver jewelry, which was introduced to Zuni Pueblo in the 19th century, most of the materials commonly worked by Zuni jewelry makers in the 20th century have always been in use in the Zuni region. These include turquoise, jet, argillite, steatite, red shale, freshwater clam shell, abalone, and spiny oyster.

Since pre-contact times, Zuni carve stone and shell fetishes, which they trade with other tribes and even non-Natives. Fetishes are carved from turquoise, amber, shell, or onyx. Today, Zuni bird fetishes are often set with heishe beads in multi-strand necklaces.

Lanyade became the first Zuni silversmith in 1872. Kineshde, a Zuni smith of the late 1890s, is credited for first combining silver and turquoise in his jewelry. Zuni jewelers soon became known for their clusterwork.

Following the Sitgreaves Expedition in 1854, Captain Lorenzo Sitgreaves illustrated a Zuni forge, which was still in use as late as the early part of the 20th century. The forge was made from adobe, with bellows handmade from animal skins. Silver was cast in sandstone molds, and finished by tooling - as opposed to engraving. Thin sheets of silver were cut with scissors and shears.

The establishment of the railroad, with the accompanying tourist trade and the advent of trading posts, heavily influenced Zuni and other Southwest tribes' jewelry manufacturing techniques and materials. In the early 20th century, trader C.G. Wallace influenced the direction of Zuni silver and lapidary work to appeal to a non-Native audience. Wallace was aided by the proliferation of the automobile and interstate highways such as Route 66 and I-40, and promotion of tourism in Gallup and Zuni. Wallace employed local Zuni people as clerks, jewelry makers, and miners. He provided tools, equipment, and silversmithing supplies to the jewelers with whom he did business. Wallace influenced Zuni art by encouraging the use of specific materials that sold well at his posts - such as coral - and discouraging others such as tortoise shell.

Wallace provided large chunks of turquoise to Zuni artists, giving them the opportunity to carve figures in the round. Wallace also encouraged the increased production and improvement of small-stone techniques like needlepoint and petit point in the hope that these styles would thwart the production of machine-made jewelry. He also urged jewelers to experiment with silver construction to satisfy his customers' preferences for lightweight jewelry.

== See also ==
- Native American art
- Native American beadwork
- List of indigenous artists of the Americas
- Bracer
