= Puka shell =

Naturally occurring bead-like objects

Puka shells are naturally occurring bead-like shells found on the beaches of Hawaii or other places. Each bead is the beach-worn apex of a cone snail. Such shells are often strung as necklaces, known as puka shell necklaces. Puka is the Hawaiian word for "hole" and refers to the naturally occurring hole in the middle of these rounded and worn shell fragments.

Numerous inexpensive imitations are now widely sold as puka shell necklaces. The majority of contemporary "puka shell necklaces" are not made from cone shells, but from other shells, or even from plastic. In addition, some strings of beads are currently sold that are made from cone shells, but the beads in these necklaces were not formed by natural processes. They were instead worked by hand from whole shells using pliers to break the shell down to the needed part, and then subjecting the rough results to tumble finishing, in order to give each bead more or less smooth edges in imitation of the natural wear-and-tear a shell receives when tumbled in the surf over long periods of time.

The original all-natural puka shells were very easily made into necklaces, bracelets and anklets because they were naturally pierced, which enabled them to be strung like beads. Such jewellery were often gifted by Hawaii's royal families to foreign dignitaries, but it was only during the tourism boom of the 1960s, after the islands' admission into the US, that it became massively popular as an attractive and inexpensive lei that could be made and sold on the beach. In the 1970s, this type of shell jewelry became highly sought after by celebrities like Elizabeth Taylor and prices skyrocketed. The craftsmanship also became more refined and the lei pūpū puka, puka shell leis were strung in graduated or matching styles, rather than the original random patterns. It was highly sought after in the 1990s starting from Californians and their surf culture.

== Natural puka shell formation ==
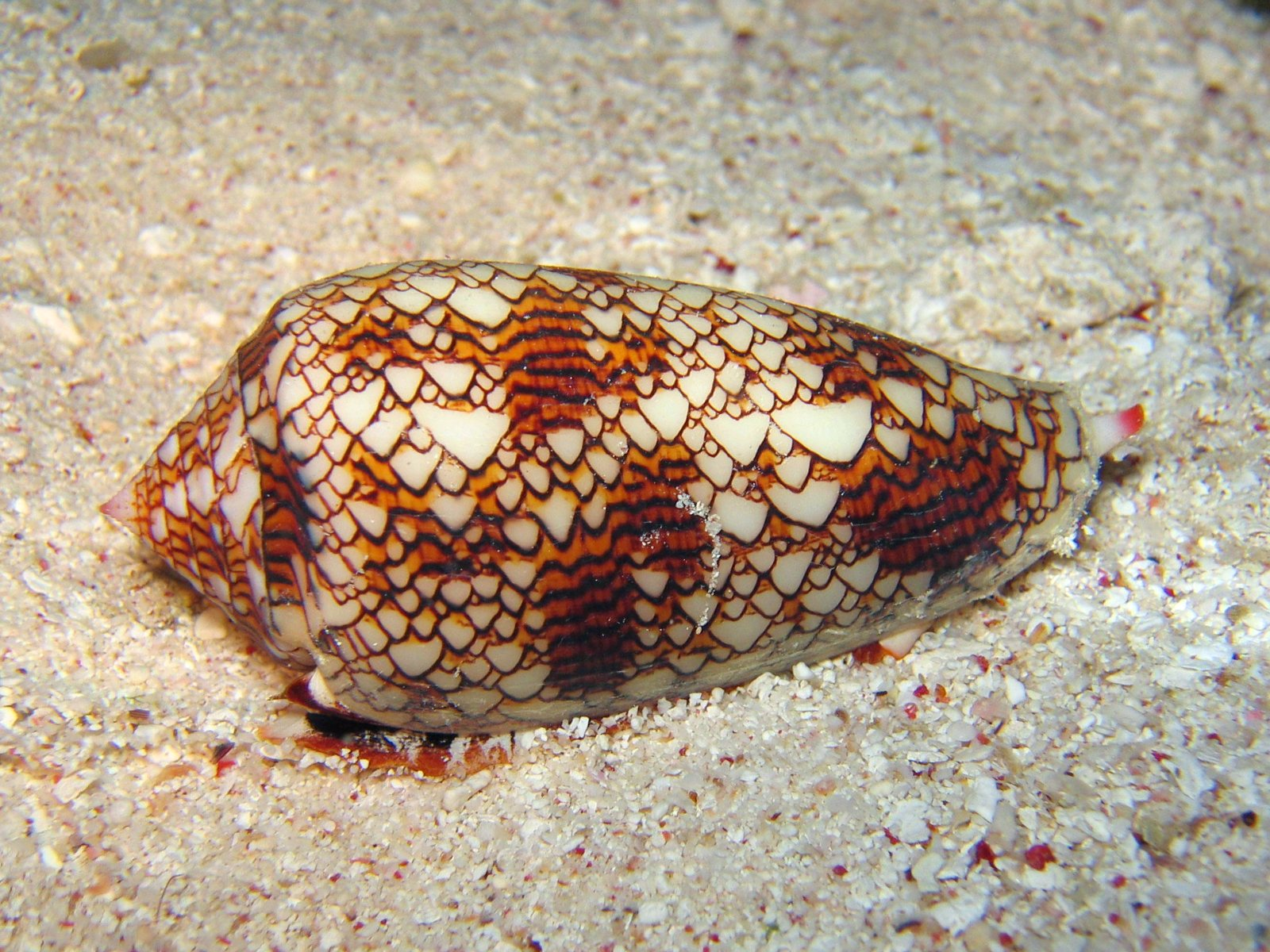
A live textile cone snail from Australia

The terminal helix of the shell of a cone snail is cone-shaped, and closed at the apex. When the empty shell is rolled over a long time by the waves in the breaking surf and coral rubble, the terminal helix of the shell breaks off or is gradually ground off, leaving the solid top of the shell intact.

Given enough time, the tip of the spire of the shell usually also wears down, and thus a natural hole is formed from one side to the other. This shell fragment can be viewed as a sort of a natural bead, and is known in Hawaii as a "puka". Real puka shells are not flat: one side of the bead is slightly convex; the other is concave. The concave side of the bead clearly shows the spiral form of the interior of the spire of the cone shell.

== Modern substitutes ==
Naturally-formed rounded cone shell fragments suitable to be used as beads are hard to find in large quantities, so true puka jewelry, formed entirely naturally, is now uncommon. Shell jewellery made from naturally occurring puka shells is also now more expensive because of the labor and time involved in locating and hand-picking these rather uncommon shell fragments from the beach drift.

In modern times, beads cut from other types of shell, or even beads of plastic, are used to make imitation puka jewellery. Cone snail shells are sometimes harvested so that they can be chipped and ground down to make more authentic-looking puka jewellery, which is however still not genuine by the standards of the originals.

A very glossy patina indicates that the shells in a necklace have been tumble polished. If the edges of the shell beads are chipped, the shells were harvested and manually broken into shape. If the "puka" or central hole is perfectly circular and parallel-sided, then the hole was drilled by humans.

== See also ==
- Shell jewelry
- Wampum

== Books ==
- Elbert, Pukui (1986). Hawaiian Dictionary. University of Hawaii Press.
- Mattes, Paul Joel (1974). Allan Seiden (ed.). Puka shell Hawaii: The story of puka shell jewelry in the Hawaiian Islands. Hawaiian Puka Shell.
