= Bernard Dawahoya =

Hopi silversmith (1935–2011)

- Masaqueva
- Born: c.1935 Hopi Pueblo, Arizona, U.S.
- Died: 2011
- Citizenship: Hopi Pueblo, American
- Known for: Silversmithing
- Style: Onlay
- Awards: Arizona Living Treasure, 1998

Bernard Dawahoya (c.1935-2011), was a Hopi silversmith of the Snow Clan. He was also known for his Kachina figurines, textile pieces, leatherwork and painting. Dawahoya was awarded the designation of an Arizona Living Treasure in 1998.

His Hopi name, Masaqueva, translates as "Little Sun" or "Wings of the Sun".

== Early life and education ==
Dawahoya was born in the village of Shungopavi, Second Mesa, Hopi Pueblo, in Arizona. He learned silversmithing from his grandfather and his uncles Sidney Sekakuku and Washington Talayumptewa, from the age of 7. He began silversmithing in earnest during his teenage years. He was a member of the Hopi Silver Craft Cooperative Guild, where he also took classes.

== Work ==
Dawahoya's heavyweight silver work has been described as having crisp designs with precise texturing in negative spaces. Symbols incorporated into the designs include Hopi Snake Dancers, representations of Crow Mother, Mudhead Katchinas, and other images that are relevant to Hopi beliefs, culture, and history. His hallmark stamp is in the form of a snow cloud, and has also used the Hopicrafts hallmark when he worked with the Sekaquaptewa brothers.

His style incorporates mixed metals – gold, silver, brass and copper – that are soldered together in layers to created designs. His jewelry incorporates lapidary work in turquoise, coral, malachite and coral in his jewelry. He favors turquoise from the Sleeping Beauty Mine, Kingman Mine, and Spider Mine. He also has made silver jars and vases using his distinct overlay technique, as well as vessels in the squat shape of Sikiyaki pottery

Dawahoya worked for a time at Wayne and Emory Sekaquaptewa's silversmithing shop, Hopi Enterprise in Phoenix and later in Kykotsmovi after the shop moved locations. In 1960, he opened his own shop on Second Mesa, called Dawa's Crafts Shop.

In the 2014 book, Reassessing Hallmarks of Native Southwest Jewelry, authors Pat and Messier state that Dawahoya was "considered one of the most prominent silversmiths of his generation. He used heavier gauge silver than most overlay artists, and his designs were bold and elegant; his cuts were crisp and precise."

== Collections ==
Dawahoya's work is held in many private collections, as well as the permanent collection of Harvard University's Peabody Museum of Archaeology and Ethnology, the Mint Museum, among other museums.
