= Emory Sekaquaptewa =

- Born: December 28, 1928; Hopi Reservation, Arizona, U.S.
- Died: December 14, 2007 (aged 78)
- Education: United States Military Academy; University of Arizona
- Known for: Role in compiling the first dictionary of the Hopi language
- Relatives: Phillip Sekaquaptewa (nephew)

Emory Sekaquaptewa (December 28, 1928 – December 14, 2007) was a Hopi leader and scholar from the Third Mesa village of Hotevilla. Known as the "Noah Webster of the Hopi Nation," he is best known for his role in compiling the first dictionary of the Hopi language. He became assistant professor, Department of Anthropology, University of Arizona in 1972, and was Professor in its Bureau of Applied Research in Anthropology from 1990 to 2007. Emory received the 4th Annual Spirit of the Heard Award by the Heard Museum in October 2007.

== Background ==
Emory Sekaquaptewa was born in Hotevilla in the Third Mesa, on the Hopi Reservation of northern Arizona, in 1928. His birth was never formally noted so he took 28 December as his birthday for official purposes. He was believed to be the first Arizona Native American to attend West Point, and he later attended law school at the University of Arizona, graduating in 1970.

He held various leadership positions within the village of Kykotsmovi, as well as positions on the Hopi Tribal Council and serving as a judge on the appellate division of the Hopi Tribal Court.

Sekaquaptewa was at one time married to Beverly Sekaquaptewa, and was the son of Helen and Emory Sekaquaptewa Sr who met at the Phoenix Indian School about 1915. His mother's story was told in the book Me and Mine: The Life Story Of Helen Sekaquaptewa as told to Louise Udall, Published by University of Arizona Press, Tucson, 1969. His father was a farmer and tribal court judge. Among his siblings were Abbott, longtime Tribal Chairman, and Marlene, a political leader and quilt maker.

Sekaquaptewa received the 4th Annual Spirit of the Heard Award by the Heard Museum on October 5, 2007, for his contributions to the Heard Mission: "To educate the public about the heritage and the living cultures and art of Native peoples, with an emphasis on the peoples of the Southwest."

== Scholarship ==
Sekaquaptewa was the "Cultural Editor" on the Hopi Dictionary Project, which produced the first ever Hopi dictionary: Hopi Dictionary/Hopìikwa Lavàytutuveni: A Hopi–English Dictionary of the Third Mesa Dialect in 1998. The 900-page dictionary contains entries on 30,000 words, as well as a sketch of Hopi grammar. This dictionary is credited with playing an important role in revitalizing the Hopi language and took him thirty years to complete, since the language had no standard or received variant and is highly complex.

He became assistant professor, Department of Anthropology, University of Arizona in 1972, and was Professor in its Bureau of Applied Research in Anthropology from 1990 to 2007. As an academic, Sekaquaptewa was the coauthor of books and articles including a chapter on the Hopi concept of clowning called "One More Smile for a Hopi Clown".

== Hopicrafts ==
About 1961 Sekaquaptewa and his brother Wayne Sekaquaptewa opened Hopi Enterprises in Phoenix, a business which employed Hopi silversmiths to make overlay jewelry for sale. Two of the silversmiths hired were Harry Sakyesva and Bernard Dawahoya. In 1962 Emory and Wayne relocated the business to the village of Kykotsmovi at Third Mesa on the Hopi Reservation and renamed it Hopicrafts. The business developed its own designs and style of overlay and successfully competed with the Hopi Silvercraft Guild on Second Mesa. It employed many talented silversmiths while in operation. Pieces made in the shop all bore a shop hallmark of a conjoined capitol "H" and lowercase "C". Sekaquaptewa made silver jewelry that was hallmarked SEKAQUAPTEWA, his brother Wayne only occasionally made jewelry and shared the hallmark. Hopicrafts closed in 1983. His nephew Phillip Sekaquaptewa, son of Wayne Sekaquaptewa, was a talented silversmith and skilled at not only Hopi silver overlay technique but an original contemporary master of stone and silver flush inlay.

== See also ==
- List of Native American artists
- Native American jewelry
- Surviving Columbus: The Story of the Pueblo People; Interview with Emory Sekaquaptewa
