= Silver overlay =

Method for creating art and luxury items

Silver overlay is an electroplated coating of silver on a non-conductive surface such as porcelain or glass. Most techniques used to create silver overlay involve the use of special flux which contains silver and turpentine oil. This is then painted on the glass ornament as a design. After the painting is complete, the entire ornament is fired under relatively low heat, it is then cleaned after being quenched and cooled, then it is placed in a solution of silver. A low-voltage current is run through the solution and the silver binds in the design, creating a permanent fusion of the silver with the glass.

A much older technique of overlay, which was commonly used in the Indian subcontinent since ancient times, involves the use of a silver sheet wrapped around the ornament and then the design beaten onto the sheet or it may be burnished. This technique renders the design silhouetted against a dark backdrop and was commonly called the Aftabi design technique. This technique of overlay predates the technique that is common today, but without the use of electroplating, it was a time-consuming and tedious process, which could only be accomplished by skilled artisans.

== History ==
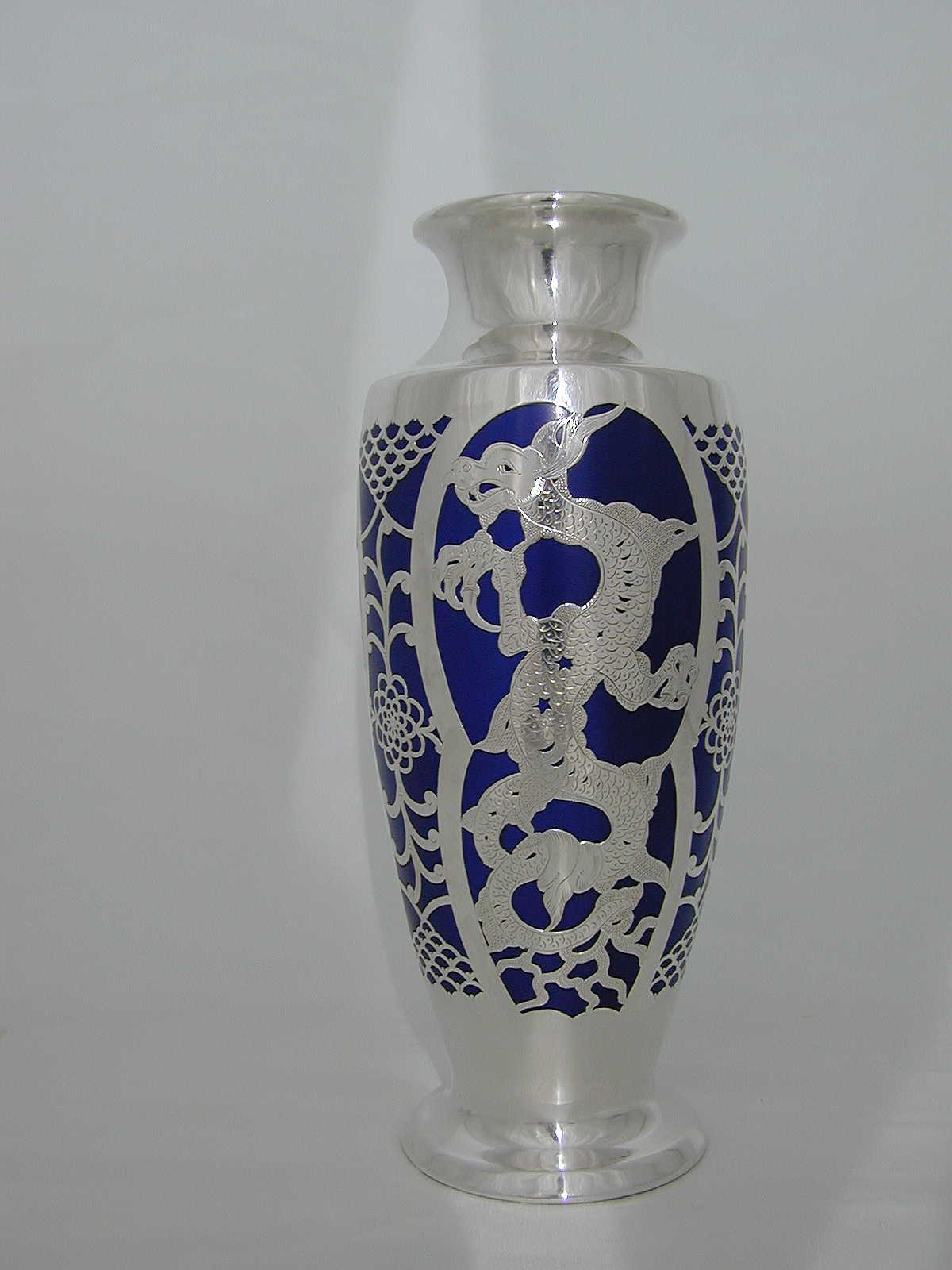
The typical thick, palpable silver work, permanently fused with the blue porcelain

The history of who first devised the process is unknown. What is known is that from 1870 onwards, a number of patents were filed for the process. Although all patents appear after 1870, it has been suggested that the process may have been discovered earlier, and the patents claimed a short time afterward. The most well known patent holders are Frederick Shirley from the United States of America, whose patent dates to 1879, Erard and Round who were under the auspices of Stevens & Williams Ltd. whose patent is from 1889, John Sharling also of the USA, whose patent is from 1893 and Friedrich Deusch, the German inventor whose name is most associated with silver overlay today, who patented the process in 1895 and displayed his work in 1907 at an exhibition in Bordeaux.

Deusch returned to Schwäbisch Gmünd in southern Germany where, in 1912, he founded his firm Deusch & Co. Deusch continued exhibiting his wares and gained the Gold Medal at the 1913 World Exposition in Ghent, Belgium.

With his presence, Schwäbisch Gmünd became the center of German silver overlay production. Schwäbisch Gmünd (about 20,000 inhabitants at that time) had a long tradition since the 16th century in the art of artists working with gold and silver. A school for applied arts existed there from an early date, which became a school for the precious metal industry in 1907. In the 1920s almost 190 firms were involved in the precious metals industry. The presence of materials, artisans, and component suppliers in on place created an ideal environment for the industry to thrive.

After Deusch and Company, other firms specializing in silver overlay were founded. In particular, the firms of Friedrich Wilhelm Spahr and Alfred and Manfred Veyhl were established.

Parallel to the development of German silver overlay, silver overlay production was also initiated in the United States.

== Technique ==
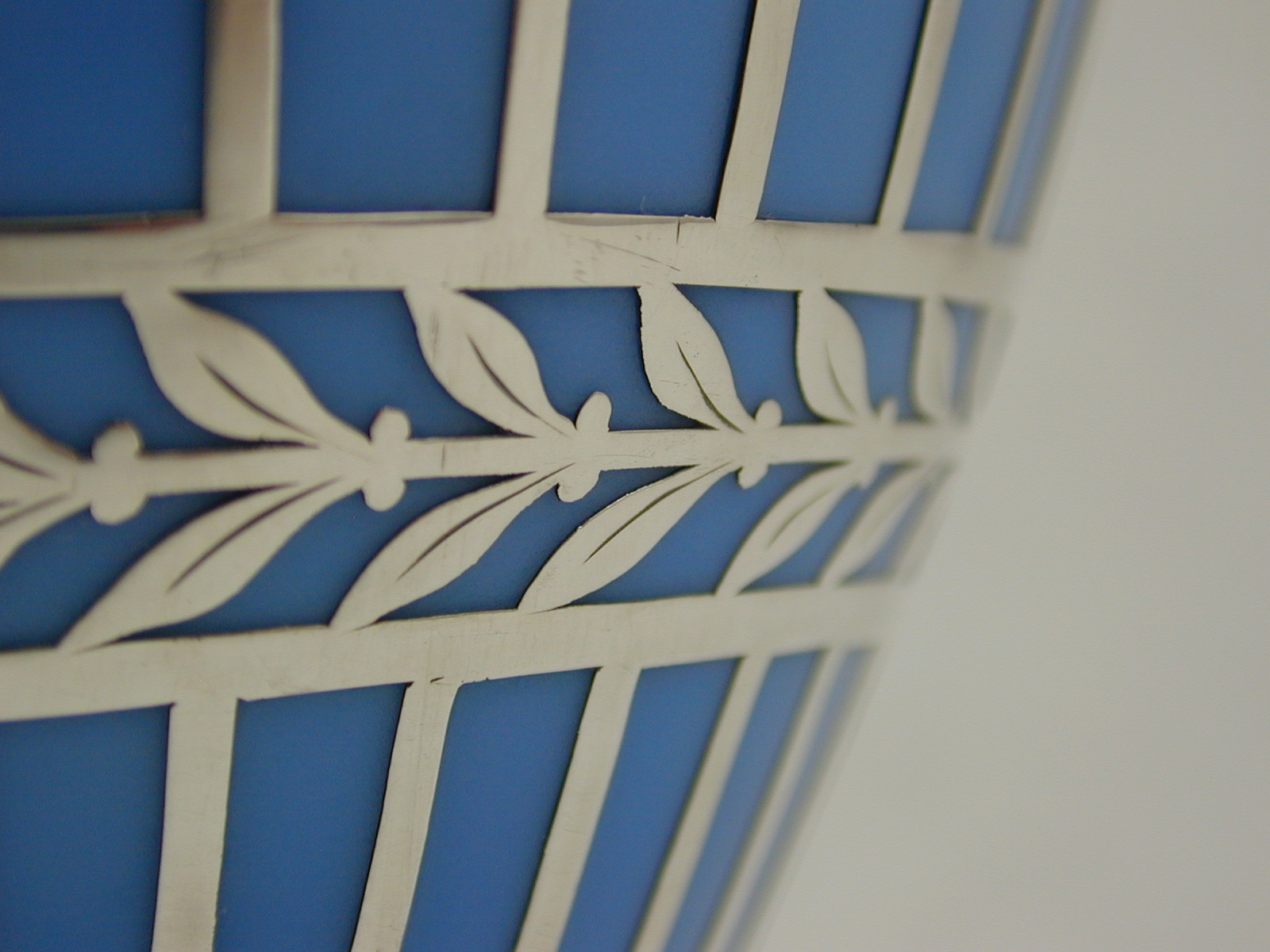
Palpable overlay with purest silver

The specific feature of German silver overlay is the degree of purity – 925 for Sterling silver or 999 for fine silver. The quality of silver used for German overlay can be seen by identifying the impressed 1000 mark (usually on the base or side of an item). The purity and thickness of the silver overlay ensures the beauty of the item is maintained without any loss to the silver even after many years of cleaning. Although other kinds of silver, such as nickel silver, can be used for silver overlay, the effect is not as vibrant.

Bohemian and Venetian Murano glass are often described as silver overlay, but the silver is so thin that it looks as though it has been painted onto the surface, producing a flat effect.

Friedrich Deusch invented a way to combine silver and a non-conductive surface such as porcelain or glass with galvanization. He achieved this with a special conductive fluid (a type of flux) which was fixed permanently on the prepared form. The particular objects (such as a vase) were first roughened by engraving or using hydrofluoric acid to etch a design. This implies that a very exact covering of the surfaces had to be achieved to prevent any damage to areas which were not to be overlaid. Maybe they used a masking lacquer which could withstand the following baking in the kiln which was used to fuse the flux with the surface of the item. The next step was to galvanize the item with the purest silver (1000).

It was very important to monitor items being overlaid with silver – waiting too long resulted in visible dark spots and slight roughness where the cathode or anode were fixed. The cathode and anode were used to charge the item electronically and this allowed the fusion of silver to the area painted with the silver flux. The thickness of silver desired on the finished item determined how long the item needed to be left in the silver bath; this could be more than 30 hours. Finally, if the masking lacquer (discussed earlier) did not burn in the kiln, it must have been removed later (probably with chemical fluids).

When colored enamels were to be used on the finished product, they had to be fired prior to the final stage of the silver overlay process. Engraving the silver was the last, and sometimes most laborious, work; it was brought to the highest level by Friedrich Wilhelm Spahr and his workers.

== Classifying ==
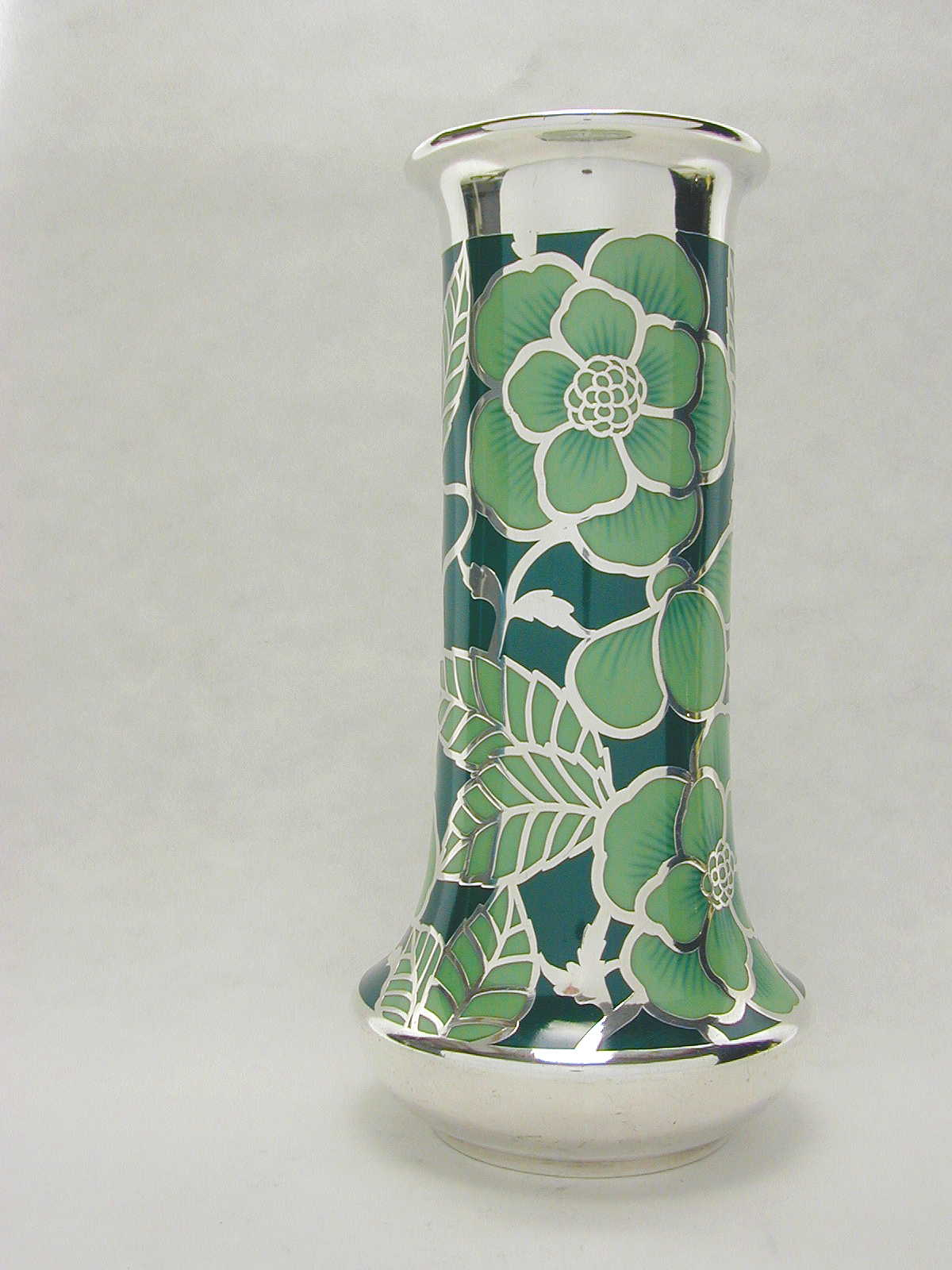
A vase of Friedrich Wilhelm Spahr

Early items designed and produced by Friedrich Deusch are very classical, and this was followed by an abstract phase of Art Déco in its purest form. From the 1950s, it was more a concrete style with flowers and so forth. Deusch applied silver overlay to vases, plates, coffee and tea services, and other items.

From the outset, the firm of Alfred Veyhl had its own style. It was mostly a combination of polychromatic painted details of birds, flowers, and similar motifs, framed with silver. The more abstract designs are rare. Alfred, and later his son Manfred Veyhl, were the only ones who used varnish to avoid silver oxidation. Alfred used softer and rounder lines in his designs, whereas Manfred had a more angular, expressive style. A specialty for this company was that clients could choose from a certain range of porcelain forms and décors. The items were then produced exclusively in a single production run.

An outstanding figure is Friedrich Wilhelm Spahr. There is evidence that he learned his skill from Friedrich Deusch (some items of both firms have very similar formal designs). He was not only an artisan but an artist in developing repeating circumferential forms in perfect and harmonic proportion. Very often it is the pure arrangement of lines (curved or straight), or their combination, with flowers or birds. Never over-designed, but enough to divide the small surface (for example, a vase) in a self-evident and harmonious way. Like the others, not only did he design and apply the silver overlay, but he also prepared the porcelain with his own enamel colors, painted the motifs, and engraved the silver. He did not produce all these items by himself, instead, Spahr's factory employed about forty specialized workers. The outstanding engraved pieces show the unrivaled quality of Spahr.

The early items typically have a thicker silver layer. One can also see the stroke of the brush which proves the overlay and painted surface were handcrafted. Printed designs were used more often on items produced later, especially those of Manfred Vehyl. These can be recognized by studying the design: if the color is flat and full of small dots, this strongly indicates a printed design. Also, the silver work on printed color designs appears not to cover the design closely, as it should.

The three companies bought and used porcelain blanks from several well-known producers such as Rosenthal, Hutschenreuther, Thomas Bavaria, Krautheim & Adelberg and marketed the finished products under their own names. They also produced silver overlay glass in the same manner. A large amount of glassware came from WMF in Geislingen, which is not far from Schwäbisch Gmünd. A respectable amount of glass to be overlaid also came from Jean Beck, a famous glass designer in Munich. Until recently, it was believed that Beck created the brilliant silver designs himself and that Deusch only produced them. However, this was not the case. As with the porcelain, Deusch and others bought the delightfully stylized glass blanks, decorated them in silver overlay, and sold them under their own names.

== Marks ==
Friedrich Deusch used the impressed mark "Deusch 1000 / 1000" on the early items. This mark was punched directly into the silver. Very often one may also find a red three-digit number on the bottom of the porcelain or glass which indicates this early production. Later, it was replaced by a red stamp which shows a coffeepot and the name Deusch. In addition, to these marks, the following marks may also be found: "1000 / 1000 Silber" or "1000 / 1000 Feinsilber". Later items may have the additional mark "Made in Western Germany".

Alfred and Manfred Veyhl used many different marks, stamps, and labels (always placed on the bottom of the item). Vehyl's work often shows the "1000/1000 silver" mark included in the body of the design. Some rare items are signed by a handwritten monogram (MV for Manfred Veyhl) and the word "Handgemalt" (handpainted).

Friedrich Wilhelm Spahr mostly used marks impressed directly into the silver. The very earliest and rarest of Spahr's marks began with "MSG 1000 10" ("MSG" standing for "Manufaktur Schwäbisch Gmünd"). This mark was followed by "Spahr 1000 10" (sometimes stamped in black letters on a porcelain base), later with "Spahr 1000", and finally with transparent plastic labels on the bottom printed "Spahr Feinsilberauflage 1000 / 1000".

Alvin Corporation, which was later owned by the Gorham Mfg. Co. after 1928, also used special marks. They manufacture pieces of sterling silver flatware, as well as hollowware and special toilet ware.

The La Pierre Manufacturing Company also sued special marks. It was established by Frank H. La Pierre in 1885, and headquartered at 18 East 14th Street, NY. It relocated its offices to Newark, NJ before its incorporation in 1895. Their special marks appear on their silver overlay items such as hollowware and novelty items.

The Rockwell Silver Company established in Meriden, CT around 1905 created a number of designs that featured silver overlay, however, they were merged with Silver City Glass Company in 1978, so even though they have done extensive work, there are no unique marks associated with the company.

The Gorham Manufacturing Co., which was active from 1848 till 1865, used a lion as their mark. They also used a ram head and the phrase "coin" to mark their items.

Various Marks used by companies that created silver overly ornaments

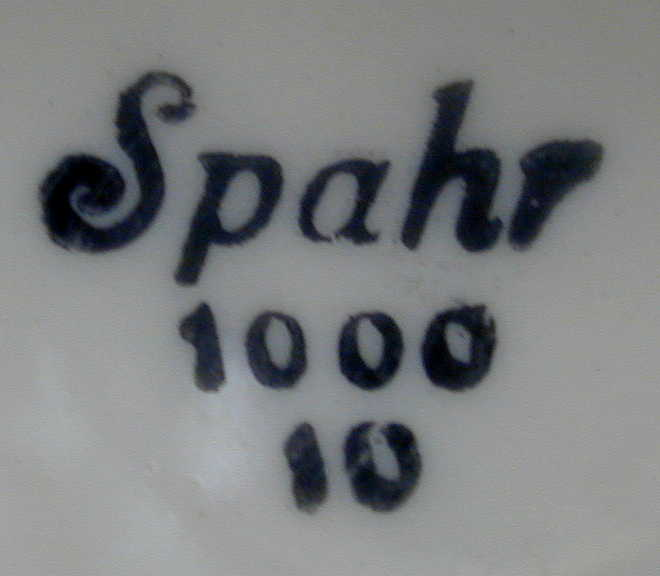

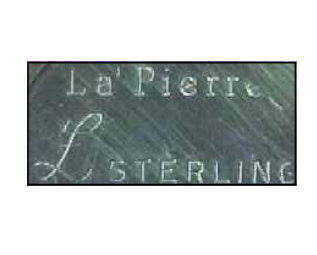

== Sales and distribution ==
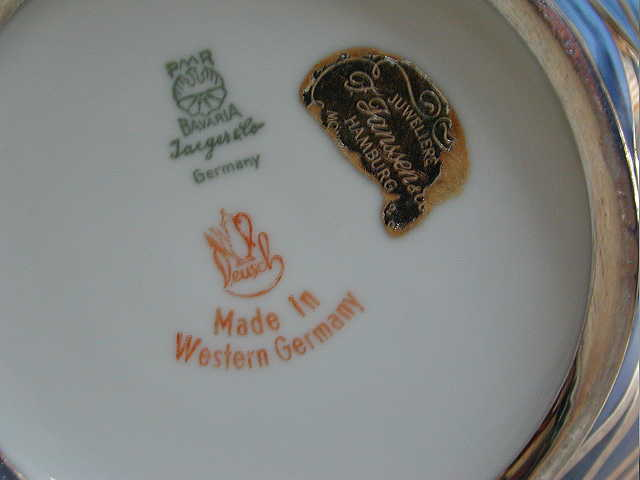
A Vase of Deusch with preserved label of jewellery store

These luxurious products were most often sold in important jewellery stores. Sometimes the retailer's paper labels survived the cleaning attempts of the last decades, and these labels are always a keen addition for any collector. They confirm that silver overlay porcelain and glass were sold all over Germany.

Friedrich Deusch, the oldest and biggest firm, also sold internationally and even produced a large amount of silver overlay tableware for the Royal House of Saudi Arabia. Deusch is the only firm that has survived (as of 2013), although the focus of production has changed from fine art to galvanizing parts for the automobile industry. In 1976, after three generations, the Deusch family relinquished interest in the firm of Friedrich Deusch and Company Today, there is scant knowledge and interest in this firm's history.

Veyhl (father and son) traveled a lot offering their newest items to different jewellery stores. Later, they opened their own shop in Plüderhausen (close to Schwäbisch Gmünd). Friedrich Wilhelm Spahr created timeless designs that can be found today all over Europe and even in the United States. These are rare, desirable, and mostly exquisite.

Silver overlay was a very exclusive luxury ware from the beginning because of the very complicated and time-consuming steps of manufacturing. Silver overlay items were never mass-produced and were made in limited numbers. The development of silver overlay was forged by a technical alliance between artists, artisans, and advances in chemistry, physics, electronics, and, ultimately, the industrialized techniques of the late 19th century. The arts movements of the day were philosophically against industrialized techniques. Yet, ironically, many delightfully decorated pieces of silver overlay porcelain and glass can be seen with superb handicraft and Art Nouveau-inspired designs. Thus, while the handicraft movement died after a single incandescent generation, their designs live on, as do the stunning works of Friedrich Deusch, Friedrich Wilhelm Spahr, and Alfred & Manfred Vehyl.
