= Nassarius kraussianus =

Scientific classification
- Kingdom: Animalia
- Phylum: Mollusca
- Class: Gastropoda
- Subclass: Caenogastropoda
- Order: Neogastropoda
- Family: Nassariidae
- Genus: Nassarius
- Species: N. kraussianus

Binomial name
- Nassarius kraussianus (Dunker, 1846)

Synonyms
- Alectrion kraussiana Dunker, 1846; Buccinum (Nassa) kraussianum Dunker, 1846; Buccinum kraussianum Dunker, 1846 (original combination); Nassa (Eione) orbiculata A. Adams, 1852; Nassa kraussiana (Dunker, 1846)

Species of gastropod

Nassarius kraussianus, common name: tick shell, is a species of sea snail, a marine gastropod mollusk in the family Nassariidae, the Nassa mud snails or dog whelks.

== Description ==
The size of the shell varies from 6 mm to 10 mm.

== Distribution ==
This species occurs in the Indian Ocean off Mozambique, South Africa, and Réunion, and in the Atlantic Ocean off Namibia.
