= Heishe =

Beads of the Kewa Pueblo people

Heishe or heishi (pronounced "hee shee") are small disc- or tube-shaped beads made of organic shells or ground and polished stones. They come from the Kewa Pueblo people (formerly Santo Domingo Pueblo) of New Mexico, before the use of metals in jewelry by that people. The name is the word for shell bead in the Eastern Keresan language of the Santo Domingo Indians.

The oldest specimens of heishe date back to around 6000 BCE, although the same technique was used in northern Africa 30,000 years ago, using ostrich eggshell.

Modern heishe beads are commonly mechanically mass-produced; however, some artists still handmake beads. The beads are hand-chipped, with holes drilled through their centers using pointed stones.
