= Native American women in the arts =

Native American women in the arts are women who are from Indigenous peoples from what is now the mainland United States who are visual art professionals. Women in Native American communities have been producing art intertwined with spirituality, life, and beauty for centuries. Women have worked to produce traditional art, passing these crafts down generation by generation, as well as contemporary art in the form of photography, printmaking, and performance art.

== 19th century ==
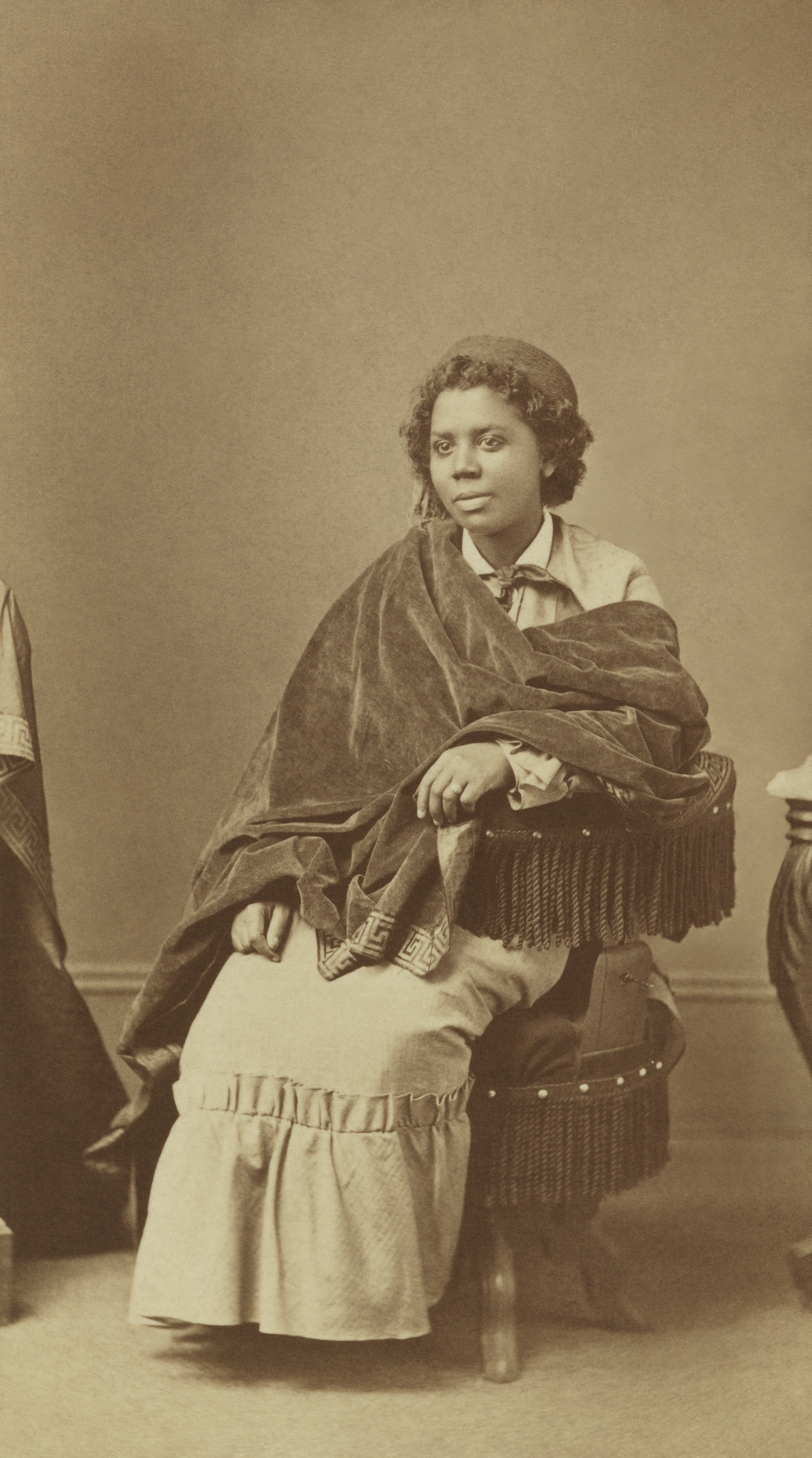
Edmonia Lewis, sculptor

Edmonia Lewis, an African American-Ojibwe sculptor during the mid-1800s, began her studies at Oberlin College, a college known as the first in the United States to admit African American students. It was there that Lewis changed her Ojibwe name Wildfire due to discrimination and pressure she felt from the community. She began to study under the guidance of popular sculptor Edward Augustus Brackett after moving to Boston in 1863, and there she created a bust of Colonel Robert Gould Shaw, the commander of the African American 54th Regiment. This work drew great praise from the community, including that from fellow sculptor Harriet Hosmer and the Shaw family, who offered to buy the bust. With the payments she received from Shaw's likeness Lewis was able to fund her trip to Rome, Italy in 1865. There she expanded her arts in the neoclassical realm and became the first American woman to seek training in neoclassical sculpture.

In Rome, Lewis shared a space, the studio of 18th-century Italian sculptor Antonio Canova, with fellow sculptor Anne Whitney. Lewis began to carve in marble to avoid accusations some would make of fellow artists that their work was done by studio stone cutters. She found inspiration in her dual ancestry, the abolitionist fight, and the civil war. Another great inspiration of hers was the work of Henry Wadsworth Longfellow and his poem, The Song of Hiawatha, and she sculpted a bust in his honor due to her admiration. As described by Anne Whitney, "Mr L. sat to her & they think it is now quite a creditable performance, better I think than many likenesses of him." Another well-known sculpture of hers, Forever Free, stands in white marble. Inspired by the Emancipation Proclamation, it depicts a man with his hand raised with a broken chain and shackle. Beside the man is a woman on her knees praying.

In 1876, Lewis' work was shown at the Philadelphia Centennial Exposition. Lewis's epic work, The Death of Cleopatra, was presented for the occasion. In this piece she portrayed the Egyptian queen in a vulnerable state, which was unprecedented for the time. Artist William J. Clark commented at the time:

this Cleopatra ... resembled the real heroine of history ... Miss Lewis' Cleopatra, like the figures sculpted by Story and Gould, is seated in a chair; the poison of the asp has done its work, and the Queen is dead. The effects of death are represented with such skill as to be absolutely repellent—and it is a question whether a statue of the ghastly characteristics of this one does not overstep the bounds of legitimate art. Apart from all questions of taste, however, the striking qualities of the work are undeniable, and it could only have been reproduced by a sculptor of very genuine endowments.

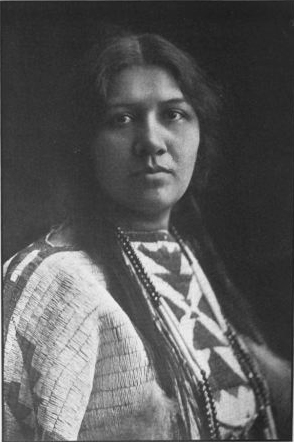
Angel De Cora, painter

In the late 1800s Angel De Cora (Ho-chunk) was a painter and writer who contributed to art as a Native American who had been assimilated through a policy put forth by President Grant. Her earliest paintings appeared with her own stories, The Sick Child and The Grey Wolf's Daughter, in Harper's Magazine. In her writing De Cora sought to change attitudes about Native Americans and described situations everyone could relate to. De Cora had a talent with combining a mix of Native American painting style with the mainstream European American style popular at the time, otherwise described as transculturation, and reflected the emotions from her stories in her art. Her success with her stories in Harper's helped her start a career in illustrating books about Native Americans for children. Though she had other interests in art, she was encouraged by her professors to pursue Native American influenced art because of their idea that art and ethnicity were linked. Though De Cora flourished as an artist, she was still torn between two identities that were placed on her: one the noble savage, the other a product of successful assimilation, and though Harper's had published her work, it described her as a "naive ... Indian girl," and one of her mentors only had this to say about her: "Unfortunately she was a woman and still more unfortunately an American Indian."

In 1900 De Cora was given the opportunity to design the frontispiece for ethnologist Francis LaFlesche's book, The Middle Five, and soon after won a contest to also design the book's cover. On the cover she created her own typography with its own Native American influence and illustrated it with the simplistic style that was popular at the time. Not long after De Cora became a professor of Native Indian Art at the Carlisle Indian Industrial School in 1906 and was invested in building an appreciation for Native American art and history with the idea in mind to bring Native American art into mainstream culture. De Cora felt art was central to the economic survival and preservation of Native American culture and encouraged her students to combine their Native American art into modern art to produce marketable items that could be used in home design. By doing so, De Cora enabled a trend toward art. She knew Native Americans would eventually leave certain aspects of their culture behind in time, but she also felt art would be one of the things to create a united community and help Native Americans to be proud of their heritage. "He may shed his outer skin, but his markings lie below that and should show up only the brighter," she said of Native Americans during a speech in a 1911 proceeding of the Society of American Indians.

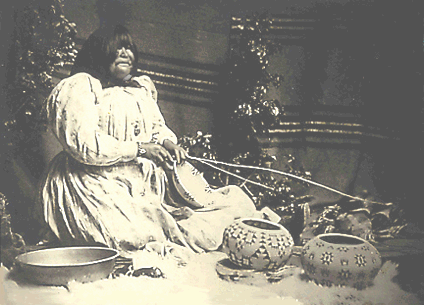
Dat So La Lee, basket weaver

Though the history of Dat So La Lee is slightly of a mythic quality, what is known of her is her discovery as a washerwoman by Amy and Abe Cohn in 1895, who found her baskets incredibly intriguing. The Cohns began selling her baskets in their shop in 1899 to tourists of Lake Tahoe. Though her basketry was revered, like many Native Americans of the day Dat So La Lee was presented by Amy Cohn as the noble savage through her lectures. "To the whole audience there was no incongruity in having a white woman explain the basket's symbols, while the weaver herself remained silent." Further, Dat So La Lee's image was displayed on flyers as a simple-minded, unattractive native who Abe Cohn had to put up with. The Cohns fabricated much of her life for their own advertising purposes. It was Dat So La Lee who created the degikup style of basket weaving, though Amy Cohn preferred to boast in lectures this was of the native "pre-contamination" past (that is, before European settlers had appeared). During this time much appropriation and romanticization of Native American culture was popular, and this was not necessarily out of place: Amy Cohn would dress in native regalia for her lectures. Eventually, as a ploy to raise the demand for baskets, the Cohns announced that baskets would be made less and less due to Dat So La Lee's oncoming blindness, though a reporter at the time who interviewed Abe Cohn blamed the decrease on alcoholism. Whether either of these claims are true is undocumented.

== 20th century ==
Photography was a new medium at the turn of the century and women quickly added it to their repertoire, finding ways to send powerful messages about identity through their images.

These photographers portray their cultures not as vanishing, but as part of a lively, assertive group of people confident about the importance of their cultures in the past, their importance to the present and their influence on the future. They sometimes use images identified with Indian cultures, but these images are not used as emblems of a generic unified past. Instead the images carry specific messages or stories about how individual artists interpret family and tribal histories, how they experience the present, or what they project for the future.

Jennie Ross Cobb (Cherokee) began to break stereotypes about Native Americans by presenting Cherokee women who were "poised, self-assured, fashionable, confident carriers of two cultures and extremely proud of their Cherokee heritage." Cobb, the great-granddaughter of Cherokee chief John Ross, began photography as a child in Tahlequah, Oklahoma after receiving a camera from her father. Though formal poses were more traditional at the time, Cobb insisted on taking photographs of women as they did daily activities. Through her photography Cobb was able to capture women with the care that no other photographer could have brought to the medium. This was attributed to Cobb's close connection to her subjects and the ability to, as Hulleah Tsinhnahjinnie puts it, "truly (imagine) Native American women with love and a humanizing eye."

As a child Mabel McKay (Pomo) had dreams that foresaw her roles of a sucking doctor and basket weaver. During these dreams she learned to weave baskets as young as six years old and was inspired for designs and their special uses. McKay believed "baskets are living entities, not just pretty objects to look at, and each basket has a particular purpose." She connected baskets with her healing as a doctor and would give a patient a basket of their own. McKay began holding classes to share her basket weaving skills and helped to introduce traditional basket weaving to those outside of the Native American community. During the 1950s and 1960s McKay also made public-speaking engagements at universities and museums in California on Native American culture and the art of basket weaving. By 1975, McKay was known as the last remaining spiritual adviser of the Pomoans. McKay said of her basket weaving, "It's no such thing art. I only follow my dream. That's how I learn."

By 1920 an interest was growing for Native American art, either made by or influenced by Native Americans. Pop Chalee, who originally came from Taos Pueblo, ended up running away from her mother's home in Utah when she was only sixteen years old. She and her family settled in Taos Pueblo where, for the most part, she felt like an outsider. These clashing feelings made Chalee and her family decide to move back to Utah.

Chalee began attending the Santa Fe Indian School in 1930 as a student of Dorothy Dunn. Chalee was taught in a specific design which would come to be associated with the Kiowa Movement. At Dunn's studio, Native American students were encouraged for the first time to pursue a career in art. In 1936 one of Chalee's paintings was purchased by Disney as an inspiration for Bambi. After graduating Chalee was commissioned to paint a mural for Maisel's Trading Post along with fellow artists of the time: Awa Tsireh, Joe H. Herrera, Pablita Velarde, Harrison Begay, and Popovi Da. Chalee, and continued to paint murals which included sites such as the Albuquerque Airport and the Santa Fe Railroad.

Chalee was not just a visual artist. She also performed while promoting the film version of Annie Get Your Gun, telling stories, lecturing, and even singing while wearing native dress and elaborate accessories.

Around the same time as Pop Chalee was gaining popularity, another artist, Ellen Neel, was taking risks in Canada by taking part in potlatch. This was banned by both the United States and Canada, who saw it as a "useless custom." Neel (Kwakwaka'wakw) was a totem woodcarver who was the first to transfer elements of her totem designs to paper and fabric and carved miniature poles for tourists. In 1946 Neel opened Totem Arts Studios and began her work in a former World War II bunker. During this time she also worked on repairing and restoring older poles for the University of British Columbia, but this work proved tedious and time-consuming, and she eventually returned to work on her own art. In 1955 Neel carved five totem poles for Woodward's department store. In her history, Neel also carved major poles for Stratford, Ontario, and the Museum of Copenhagen in Denmark. "In spite of the fact that she predated (Mungo Martin) and acted as his mentor, Canadian Council turned down a request to fund her totem pole projects as late as 1960." She would die six years later.

As Ellen Neel was becoming nationally renowned for her carving work, Jaune Quick-To-See Smith (Flathead Salish) was still in high school, completing a correspondence art course from Famous Artists School. Born in 1940, Quick-To-See Smith did not have an entirely stable childhood. As a daughter of a migrant worker, her family was constantly moving, and she lived in foster homes intermittently. Her father would later inspire Quick-To-See Smith's art in the area of aesthetics, and by 1978 Quick-To-See Smith would display her paintings in her first solo art show before she had even completed her M.F.A. at University of New Mexico. Quick-To-See Smith's "art responds to art's historical misappropriations of Native cultures' symbols," with horses, buffalos, and petroglyphs as constants. Jaune said in 1994 about her work:

My paintings are expressing my feelings about particular things. They are not generic works ... Each painting is a kind of story about something that I'm thinking about. And if I can't relate to it personally, if it doesn't have meaning for me ... then how can I make a painting about it?

Other concerns that influence Quick-To-See Smith's work are racism, sexism, and environmental issues. Quick-To-See Smith is a member of Greenpeace and has organized protests over land rights, and uses natural art products.

== Artwork ==
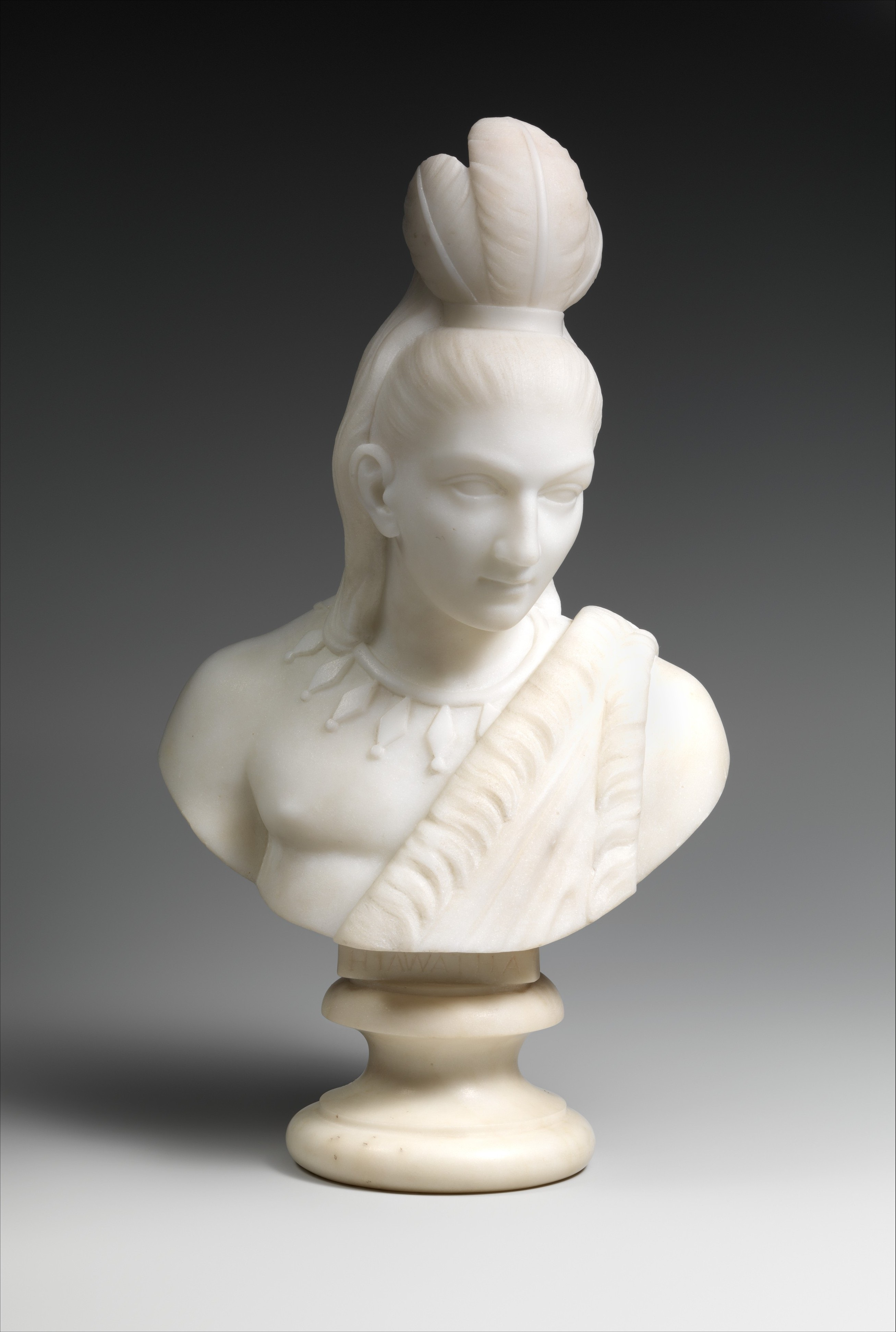
Hiawatha, marble, 1868, by Edmonia Lewis.

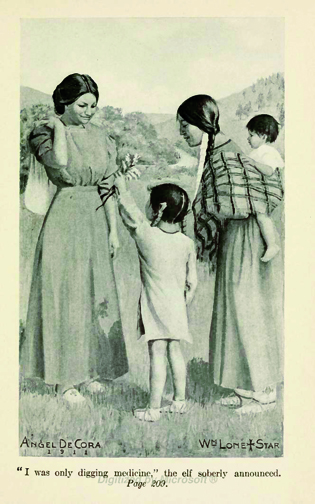
Painting by Angel De Cora.

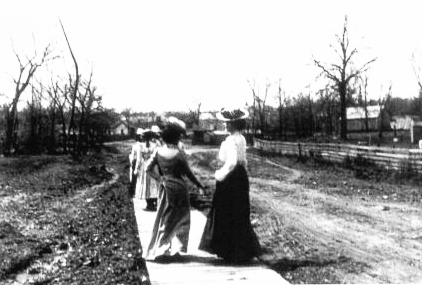
Photograph by Jennie Ross Cobb, circa 1900.

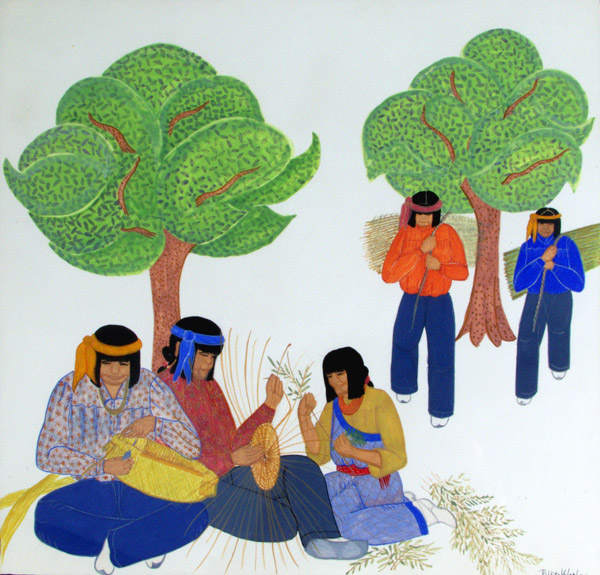
Basketmaking, circa 1940, by Pablita Velarde

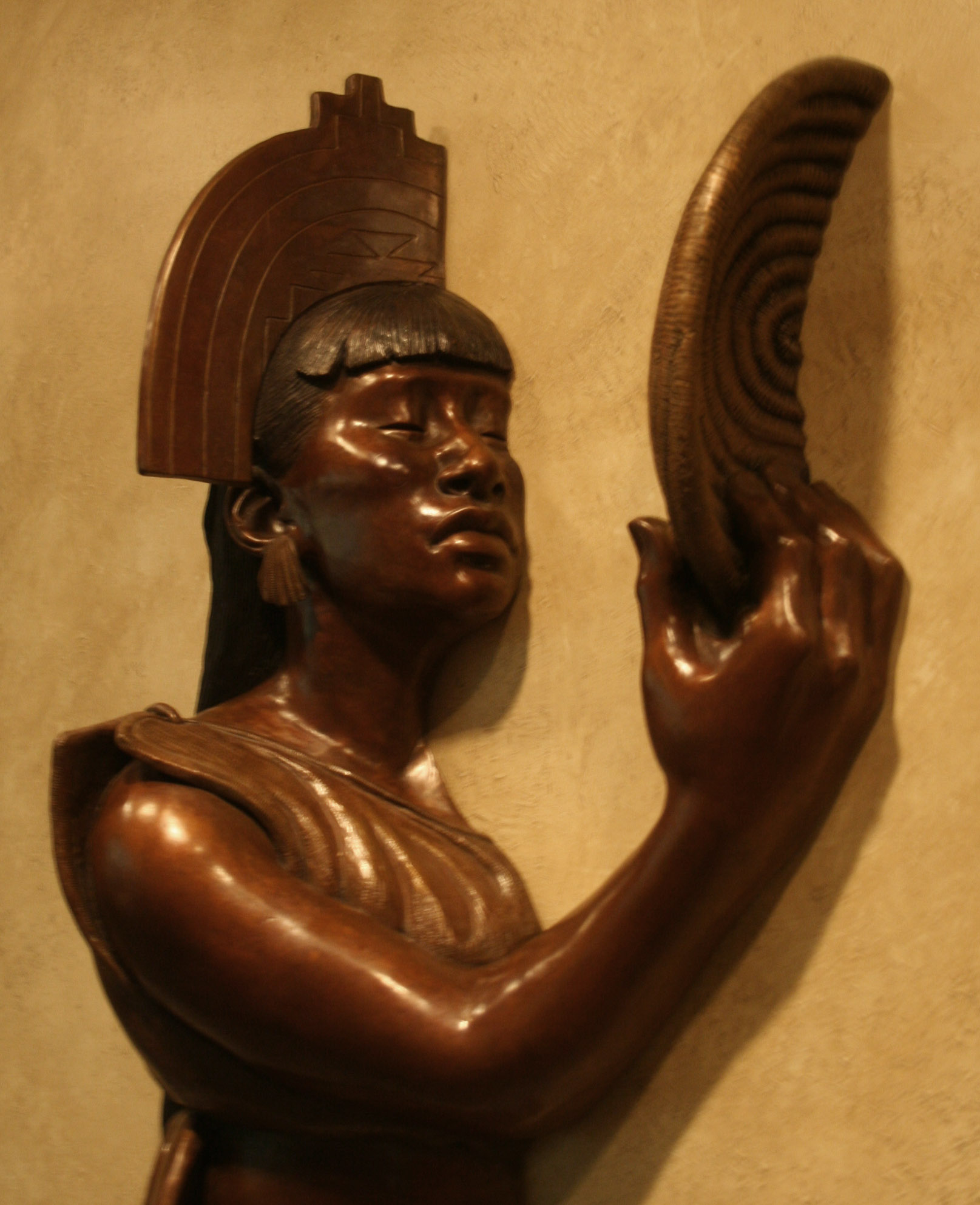
"For Life in all Directions," bronze, by Roxanne Swentzell

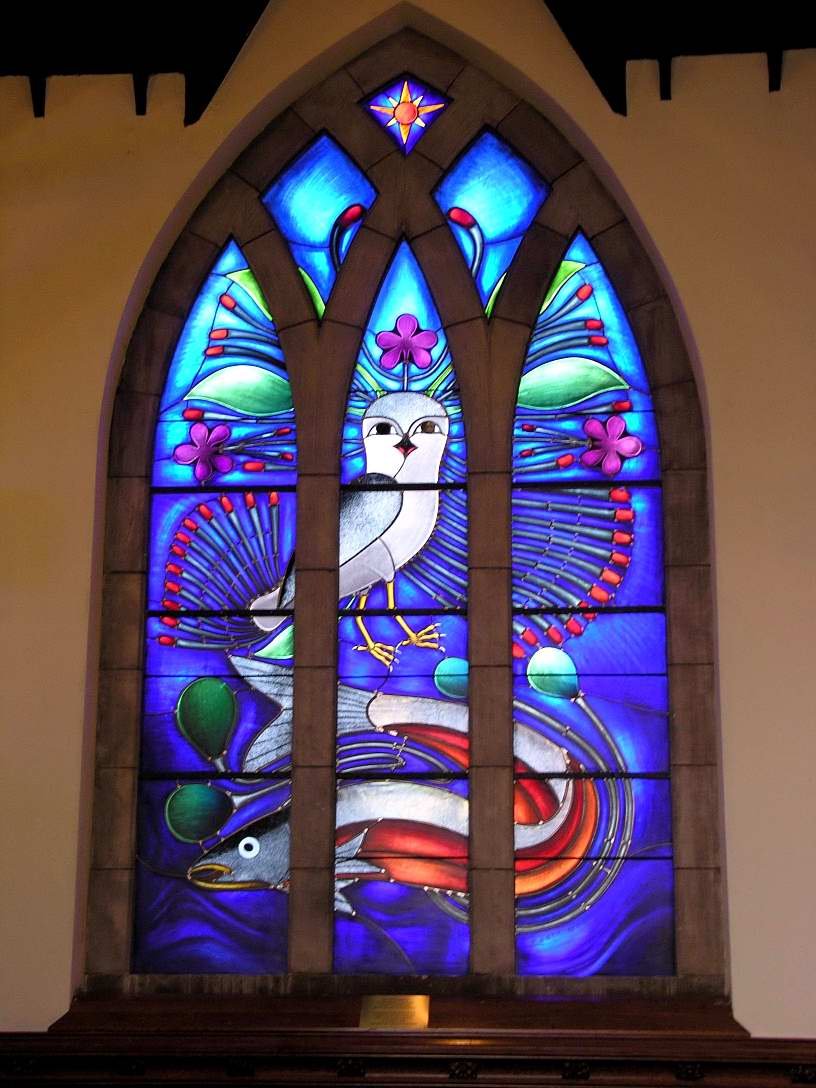
Window at John Bell Chapel of Appleby College by Kenojuak Ashevak

== See also ==
- List of 20th-century women artists
- List of indigenous artists of the Americas
- List of Native American artists
- Native American Art
- Timeline of Native American art history
- Women artists
