= Eva Mirabal =

American painter and cartoonist

- Eah-Ha-Wa
- Born: 1920; Taos Pueblo, New Mexico, U.S.
- Died: 1968 (aged 47–48); Taos Pueblo, New Mexico, U.S.
- Education: Santa Fe Indian School
- Known for: Painting, Cartooning

Eva Mirabal, also known as Eah-Ha-Wa (which translates from the Tiwa language as 'Fast Growing Corn') (1920–1968) was a Native American painter, muralist, illustrator, and cartoonist from Taos Pueblo, New Mexico. Her primary medium was gouache, a type of watercolor.

== Early life and education ==
Eva Mirabal was born in 1920 in Taos Pueblo, New Mexico. As a child, members of Mirabal's father Pedro Mirabal posed as models for non-Native American artists, including Nicolai Fechin and Joseph Imhoff, working in Taos, New Mexico. The artist reflected in a 1946 radio interview, "My tribe produces very delicate works of silver. Many fine products are produced by the method of weaving. They also make Indian necklaces and bracelets from the beads...As you can see, I was surrounded by various phases of art in my everyday life while I was a youth."

In the early 1930s, after graduating from 8th grade at Taos Pueblo Day School, Mirabal studied with Dorothy Dunn and J.C. Montoya at the Santa Fe Indian School. Dunn noted Mirabal's talents writing in her notebook "Eva had the ability to translate everyday events into scenes of warmth and semi-naturalist beauty." While attending the Studio School, which was a government-run school, Mirabal worked on a poster for the war bond campaign during World War II. Additionally she worked for the Association on American Indian Affairs on a commissioned illustration of a map of Native American tribes in the United States.

Mirabal attracted attention early in her career and was singled out for a Chicago gallery exhibition while still in her teens. Unlike more romanticized Indian scenes common in the portraits from non-Native American painters in Taos, Mirabal painted scenes depicting individuals participating in the daily life at the Pueblo.

== Career ==
Between the 1930s and the 1960s, she painted murals at various locations including at Santa Fe Indian School, Wright-Patterson Air Force Base, Buhl Planetarium, and the library of the Veterans' Hospital in Albuquerque.

In 1943, Eva enlisted in the Women's Army Corps, and served until 1947. She was a cartoonist for the Women's Army Corps, where she designed a series called G.I. Gertie, distinguishing her as one of the first female cartoonists to have her own published comic strip. In addition, she designed war posters and a building-sized mural entitled A Bridge of Wings at the Air Service Command in Patterson Field, Ohio.

After the war, Mirabal taught and painted as an artist-in-residence at Southern Illinois University in Carbondale and in 1946 she was the only woman included in the First National Exhibition of Indian Painting at the Philbrook Museum of Art in Tulsa.

Mirabal returned to Taos Pueblo in 1949 and studied at the Taos Valley Art School run by Louis Ribak and Beatrice Mandelman. Her painting, Picking Wild Berries, was included in the 1953 traveling exhibition, Contemporary American Indian Painting curated by Dorothy Dunn.

Mirabel died in 1968.

== Personal life ==
Her son, Jonathan Warm Day Coming was also an artist. In 2013, Mirabal and her son Warm Day Coming shared an art exhibition at Harwood Museum of Art in Taos, New Mexico.

== Awards ==
- 1940 – Margretta S. Dietrich Award for painting "Picking Wild Berries" (1940), Museum of New Mexico

== See also ==
- Native American women in the arts
