= Archie Blackowl =

Cheyenne artist and painter (1911–1992)

- Mistamootova
- Born: November 23, 1911; Weatherford, Custer County, Oklahoma, US
- Died: September 15, 1992 (aged 80); Stillwater, Oklahoma, US
- Other name: Archie Blackowl Sr.
- Citizenship: Cheyenne and Arapaho Tribes, American
- Education: Haskell Indian Nations University
- Occupations: Artist; painter; teacher
- Movement: Southern Plains Flatstyle
- Children: 10

Archie Blackowl (Cheyenne: Mistamootova, Flying Hawk; (Note: Possibly Cheyenne: Méstaa'e Ȯhmo'ȯhtávaestse, transl. Black Owl?) November 23, 1911–September 15, 1992) was a Cheyenne artist, painter, and teacher who played a pivotal role in mid-20th century Native American art.

== Early life and education ==
Blackowl was born on November 23, 1911 in Weatherford, Oklahoma to Wade Blackowl and Woesta White Cow Crow Neck (later Lefthand; 1891–1966).

In 1918, aged 7, Blackowl was forcibly placed into an Indian boarding school by the American government. Blackowl, was educated at Haskell Indian Nations University, studied under Olle Nordmark. Blackowl was a muralist and studio painter, who began painting actively and professionally in the early 1930s. He was commissioned to paint a mural in The Palmer House, a hotel in Chicago, Illinois.

== Career ==
Archie Blackowl had many occupations including teacher, juror at the Philbrook Indian annual, muralist, civil service employee, Walt Disney studio employee, industrial painter for the aircraft industry, and artist. Blackowl is generally considered to be one of the more important Oklahoma traditional painters. Blackowl's work captures the traditional Southern Plains culture and life. His paintings, generally in tempera or mixed media, depict scenes of dancers or ceremonies in the Flat style of the Dorothy Dunn school or Bacone style of painting. Blackowl was best known for his stylized dancers adorned with traditional regalia and lack of backgrounds, as well as works upon the unforgiving blackboard. Blackowl's devotion to traditional style flat painting earned him the honor of "Living Legend," by Ralph Oliver in 1990, as referenced in "Biographical Directory of Native American Painters," by Patrick D. Lester.

Blackowl has inspired many contemporary artists across the United States. His art is a legacy to which many young Native artists look to for information of tradition and technical skills.

Private collectors encouraged Indian artists to submit their artwork to competitions. Bernard Frazier sent letters to his friends and Indian artists, teachers, and students to recognize art that could be submitted to the Philbrook Indian Annual (which was an art show that helped develop the 20th century Native American fine art along with its history and impact). Before the 1946 Philbrook Indian Annual, Frazier wrote to Blackowl and asked him to "do Blackout and Philbrook a favor by painting some very big, very good Cheyenne scenes which can be entered in the competition". Blackowl was later a juror at the show and helped the Native American art scene by building a cultural bridge to the Native American people and art shows. Blackowl's works are included in such museum collections as the Gilcrease Museum in Tulsa, Oklahoma, the Millicent Rogers Museum in Taos, New Mexico, and the Sequoyah Research Center in Little Rock, Arkansas. Blackowl's work is also in many private collections nationwide.

== Public collections ==
Blackowl's work can be found in the following public art collections: Oklahoma State Art Collection Sam Noble Museum American Indian Arts Pierson Gallery of America Fine Art Mutual Art

== Death ==
Archie Blackowl died on September 15, 1992, in Stillwater, Oklahoma. He was survived by ten children.
