= Olle Nordmark =

Swedish painter and muralist

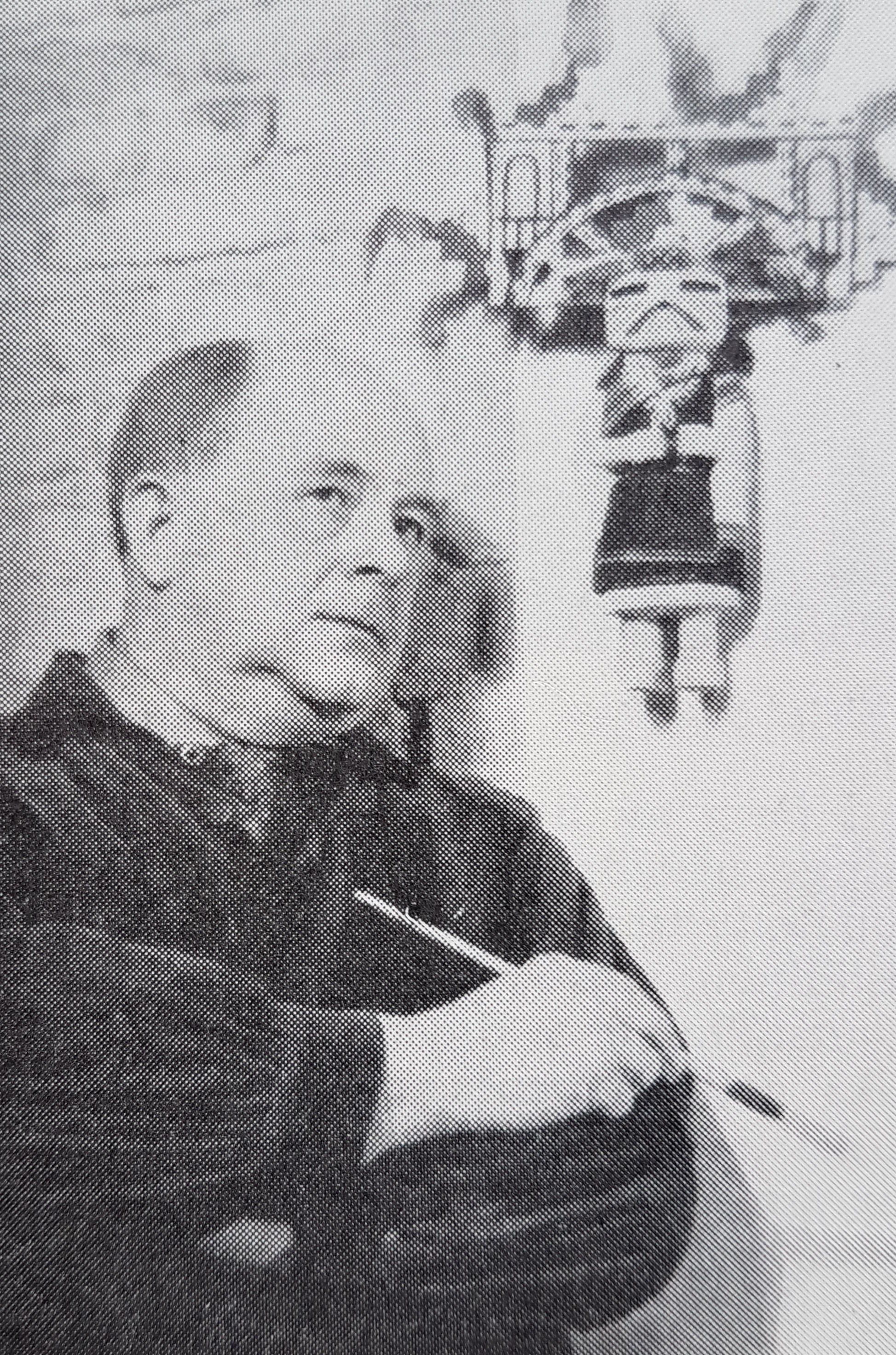
- Born: Olof Emanuel Nordmark; May 21, 1890; Nordanholen, Mockfjärd, Sweden
- Died: December 18, 1973 (aged 83); Huningue, Haut-Rhin, France
- Education: Althins målarskola
- Occupations: Painter; muralist; teacher; graphic designer; illustrator
- Spouse(s): Hilja Nordmark (m. 1935; died 1963) Marie-Louise Nordmark

Olle Nordmark (May 21, 1890 – December 18, 1973), born Olof Emanuel Nordmark, was a Swedish painter, muralist, teacher, graphic designer, and illustrator. Nordmark emigrated to the United States in 1924, and was later employed by the Bureau of Indian Affairs to teach fresco painting to Native American artists. In 1964, Nordmark immigrated to Huningue, France where he lived until his death in 1973.

== Early life and education ==
Olof Emanuel Nordmark was born on May 21, 1890 (Note: Also cited as the May 25, 1890) in Nordanholen, Mockfjärd to Brita Olsdotter and Fredrik Wilhelm Nordmark, a postal worker.

At the age of 15, Nordmark decided that he was going to be an artist. Nordmark first studied art under his father before later studying under Gustaf Ankarcrona. Nordmark later studied fresco painting at the Althins målarskola in Stockholm.

Following graduation, Nordmark created murals and decorative paintings for private homes and churches. During this period Nordmark became interested in creating theatrical scenery. Nordmark later studied theatrical painting and stage design in Moscow.

== Career ==
In 1918, he returned to Stockholm, where he started to work with set designers and to create drawings for costumes. He worked for, among others, theatres such as Södra Teatern, Stora Teatern, the Folkan, the Oscarsteatern, and the Royal Swedish Opera.

Nordmark lived and worked in Stockholm until 1924. Nordmark also worked with Karl Gerhard on sets for 22 productions.

During his time in Stockholm, he also worked as the head of Grabowska, a decorative painting workshop at Karlavägen. He arranged a number of displays in the news-office window of Svenska Dagbladet for clients such as Barnängen and Finbruken.

Nordmark decorated several churches, such as Engelbrektskyrkan, Saltsjöbadskyrkan, churches in Borås and Karlskrona, and the wedding hall in Stockholm Court House. In 1924, Nordmark provided helped restore the church in Mockfjärd, contributing his work for free (pro bono) because of his love for his homestead. The same year, he started to paint a portrait of Gädd Lars Holmberg, which he finished in the US. He donated the painting to the church in Mockfjärd.

To acquire more knowledge within his field, he made several study trips on the European continent to nations including France, Germany, Italy, and Russia.

=== United States ===
"St Christopher from Canyon de Chelly, Arizona" (c 1935) depicts a Navajo Indian, who was carrying his son over the river in Canyon de Chelly during a storm. Nordmark had witnessed the event while visiting the canyon.

In 1924, he immigrated to the United States to seek more work opportunities than Sweden could offer him.

In the United States, his work was noticed by leading Broadway theater directors, and he created some sets for productions. Mostly he worked on private commissions for mural paintings in New York. Known interior designs made by him are in the American Swedish Historical Museum and the John Ericsson Room in the John Morton Memorial Building in Philadelphia, narthex ceiling of the First Swedish Baptist Church of New York and the Swedish Room at the University of Pittsburgh.

Nordmark also participated in several exhibitions, including one at the Brooklyn Museum in 1932 and another at the Delphic Studios in New York. He wrote the books Modern Methods and Techniques for Painting in Fresco and Secco (1947) and Course in Beginning Oil Painting (1960).

Although it is not known when Nordmark started to teach, it is possible that he had a summer art school at his studio in Lomala, Hopewell Junction, New York, already in the early 1930s. (Note: It is believed that Nordmark introduced his secco techniques into the United States in 1932. Lomala appears in the references as Lomala House, "Lomala" a house in Hopewell Junction or just plain Lomala in letters from Biddle and Nordmark to Marsh.) Among his first known students were Reginald Marsh and Elsa Jemne. In 1934, Marsh traveled to Lomala to learn the art of fresco painting from Nordmark, in anticipation of his commission to execute murals. He stayed for about six months with Nordmark studying fresco techniques. Marsh returned to Lomala in July 1935 with George Biddle to get extra training right before their mural projects in the Post Office Department Building in Washington, D.C. (Note: Letters from Biddle dated June 17, 1935 and July 4, 1935.) Jemne studied also fresco techniques with Nordmark at Lomala in preparation for future work in 1935.

Biddle and Marsh employed Nordmark to superintend their mural projects in the Post Office Department Building. Nordmark was involved with the project from around August 1935 to early 1936. (Note: Nordmark had a frequent mail correspondence with Marsh about the progress of the preparation of the walls for the mural paintings from around August 1935 to the end of January 1936.) In order that Nordmark would truly be able to superintend the project, Biddle hoped to induce Edward Bruce to give Nordmark some sort of work in Washington, D.C. It is possible that Nordmark was employed by the Resettlement Administration around October 1935. (Note: Biddle wrote in a letter dated June 17, 1935 about his hopes to find Nordmark some kind of work in Washington, D.C. Nordmark told in a letter dated September 19, 1935 that he had applied for a job and would get to know the outcome in about one week. In a letter dated January 27, 1936 it is possible to read between the lines that Nordmark might be working for a governmental institution. Olin Dows again writes in a letter dated December 9, 1936 that Nordmark is still working for the Resettlement. The Resettlement is assumed to be the Resettlement Administration.) He served later as a technical consultant for the Section of Fine Art and supervised mural paintings made by Native American artists.

Biddle spent a summer studying fresco techniques with Nordmark, before he began his work in the Department of Justice Building in 1936. Like a year before, Nordmark was hired to supervise the mural projects of Biddle and Henry Varnum Poor. In 1937, Nordmark joined Marsh in New York City for the Custom House murals. Marsh had insisted on using fresco for the murals, despite objections from higher-ups. (Note: No records have been found if Nordmark was employed by Biddle and Poor for the Department of Justice Building project and by Marsh for the Custom House project or was he employed by the government for these projects.) Nordmark worked also as a federal artist-in-residence in Pine Ridge Reservation in 1937, where Andrew Standing Soldier was studying under him. (Note: Standing Soldier did some experimental mural work at the Oglala Community High School under the direction of Indian Service advisers and the special summer school staff in art in 1937. Other sources tells that he was studying under Nordmark, a federal artist-in-residence, in Pine Ridge. Therefore it is likely that Nordmark worked as an artist-in-residence in Pine Ridge in 1937.)

The Department of the Interiors's Bureau of Indian Affairs employed Nordmark to teach fresco painting to Native Americans from 1938 to 1943. (Note: According to some sources Nordmark was employed by the Bureau of Indian Affairs from 1935 to 1943. This period might include also work done for other governmental institutions.) He was working at the Indian Art Center, a program for outstanding students and teachers, in Fort Sill, Oklahoma, from 1938 to 1940. (Note: In literature Indian Art Center and Fort Sill Indian School are used interchangeably. The program, called Indian Art Center, was not part of Fort Sill Indian School. It was located at the United States Army base in Fort Sill, Oklahoma.) In 1940, instructors and students from Phoenix Indian School, Phoenix, Arizona, traveled to Fort Sill to study under Nordmark. There is little known about the Indian Art Center. Some records of the program probably exist, but many may have been destroyed. According to Leonard Riddles, the students were taught tempera painting, oil painting, fresco and secco.

Oscar Jacobson, director of University of Oklahoma art department and founder of the university's art museum, criticized Nordmark's teaching. Commissioner John Collier was forced to defend it. He replied that Nordmark taught only techniques and never dictated style, design or colors to his students. This was proved by the uniquely individualistic work of Standing Soldier, who was studying again with Nordmark at the Indian Art Center in circa 1938, (Note: Standing Soldier must have been studying with Nordmark between 1938 and 1940. He finished painting a mural at the new federal post office at Blackfoot, Idaho, in 1939, therefore it is assumed that he must have been studying with Nordmark before that.) and of the Native Americans, who painted murals in the Department of the Interior Building.

Among Nordmark's other known students at the Indian Art Center were

- Spencer Asah, James Auchiah, Stephen Mopope and Leonard Riddles in 1938, (Note: Asah, Auchiah and Mopope were studying with Nordmark in 1938. The source locates the students at Fort Sill Indian School instead of Indian Art Center.)
- Archie Blackowl, Franklin Gritts, Cecil Murdock and Andrew Tsihnahjinnie in 1939,
- Allan Houser, (Note: Houser studied with Nordmark either at Indian Art Center or Fort Sill Indian School depending on source. Houser studied one year at Fort Sill Indian School in 1922, which might also be one reason for the confusion.) Oscar Howe and Victor Pepion in 1940.

Blackbear Bosin, Woody Crumbo, Charles Loloma, Fred Kabotie and David E. Williams. studied also with Nordmark at the Indian Art Center, but more detailed information about their years of attendance have not been found. Gerald Nailor, Sr. studied with Nordmark in 1940, but the location is uncertain. According to literature, he studied either privately in Oklahoma or Fort Sill Indian School, Lawton, Oklahoma. Some sources tells that Nailor enrolled with his close friend Houser for one year at the Fort Sill Indian School.

Nordmark was probably teaching at the Phoenix Indian School from 1941 to 1943. Among his students were Richard West from 1941 to 1942 and Patrick DesJarlait likely in 1942. George Smith "Woogee" Watchetaker and Herman Toppah also studied with Nordmark, but the references do not give any further information about neither the location nor the year. Later, Jacobson and Nordmark mentored together some Philbrook artists including Crumbo, Albin Jake and Jesse Edwin Davis II.

Nordmark worked as advisor or supervisor for many mural painting projects. Some of the projects he supervised were made by

- Auchiah, Blackowl, Crumbo, Gritts, Mopope, Riddles at Fort Sill Indian School from 1939 to 1940,
- Auchiah, Crumbo, Herrera, Houser, Mopope, Nailor at Department of the Interior Building, Washington, D.C., from 1939 to 1940,
- Pepion at Museum of the Plains Indian, Browning, Montana in the summer of 1941.

In 1958, Nordmark donated 58 drawings and sketches to the local history society, Mockfjärd Hembygdsförening. These works are frequently exhibited. Nordmark is known for his exquisitely beautiful colors, his original ideas and artistic taste. The lines and the colors in his theater decorations and costumes helped to create the most striking effects.

=== France ===
In 1964, Nordmark moved to Huningue, France, where he lived for the rest of his life.

== Personal life ==
In 1916, Nordmark became engaged to Ruth Granath, the daughter of a wealthy furnisher from Västerås. The engagement later ended.

On December 14, 1935 Nordmark married Hilja Maria Nordmark (née Wikstrom; November 16, 1888—April 22, 1963), a Finnish dressmaker. Nordmark later married a Swedish woman called Marie-Louise.

Nordmark died of natural causes on December 18, 1973 at his home in Huningue, France. Nordmark is buried in Huningue.
