= Andrew Standing Soldier =

Oglala–Lakota artist (1917–1967)

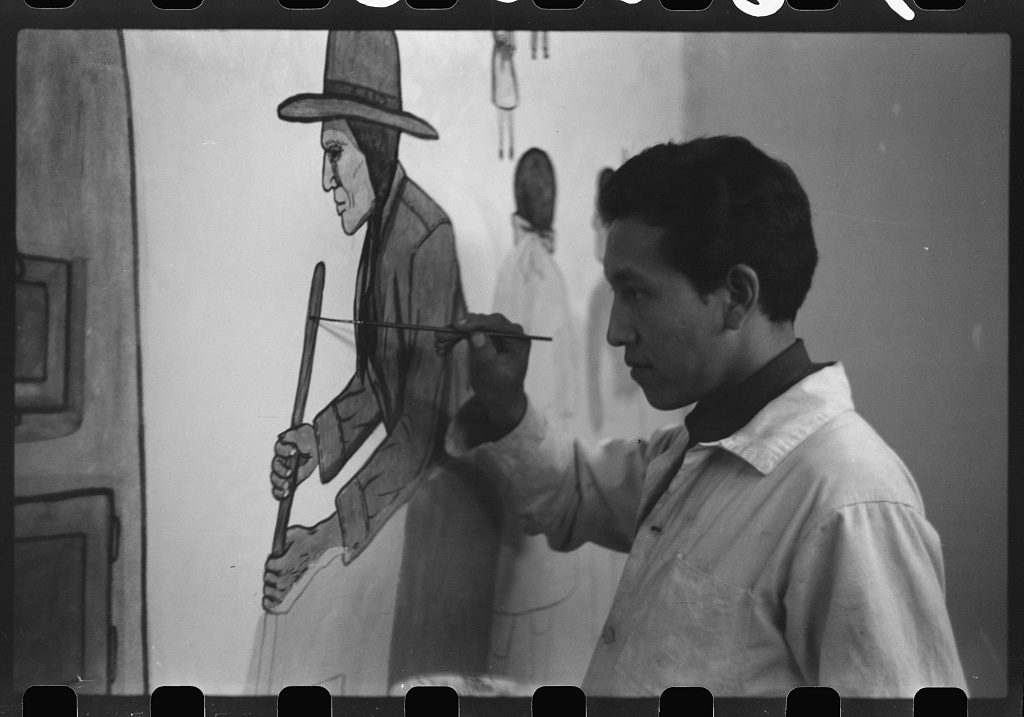
- Standing Soldier painting a mural in an auditorium in Pine Ridge, South Dakota, 1940.
- Born: February 1, 1917; Hisle, Pine Ridge Indian Reservation, South Dakota, US
- Died: February 12, 1967 (aged 50); Saint Joseph Hospital, Omaha, Nebraska, US
- Burial place: Hisle, Pine Ridge Indian Reservation, South Dakota, US
- Education: Indian Art Center
- Occupations: Artist; painter; muralist; watercolorist
- Spouse: Lena Standing Soldier (m. 1938)
- Children: 6

Andrew Standing Soldier (1917 – 1967) was an Oglala–Lakota artist, painter, muralist and watercolorist, known for his depictions of contemporary Native American life.

== Early life and education ==
Andrew Standing Soldier was born on February 1, 1917 in Hisle, Pine Ridge Indian Reservation.

Standing Soldier attended Pine Ridge Boarding School and the Oglala Community High School, on the Reservation. Encouraged by his teachers, he began to pursue mural painting during the summer of 1937, under artist Olaf (Olle) Nordmark, who was the federal artist-in-residence on the Reservation. He also studied with Nordmark at the Indian Art Center in Fort Sill, Oklahoma, in 1938.

== Career ==
In 1939 Standing Soldier won fourth place in a poster design contest for a national exhibition of Indian art. He received a prize for one of his watercolors depicting Sioux fire starters, exhibited at the Golden Gate International Exposition in 1939 in San Francisco. The exhibition was organized by the Indian Arts and Crafts Board of the US Department of Interior.

Standing Soldier was one of the approximately 10,000 artists employed during the Great Depression by the Works Progress Administration's (WPA) Federal Art Project. He was commissioned to create murals for several public buildings in Nebraska, North and South Dakota, and Idaho. His murals like The Arrival Celebration and The Round-Up for the office in Blackfoot, Idaho depicted contemporary Shoshone-Bannock life. These 1939 murals showed Native American people integrating European-American influences into their lives, which was unusual for WPA murals representing Native Americans. Standing Soldier completed additional public commissions such as the Post Office in Valentine, Nebraska. His mural for the High School Library in Fort Yates, North Dakota, the town that is the tribal headquarters for the Standing Rock Sioux Tribe, was commissioned by the Bureau of Indian Affairs and depicted the legend of Standing Rock.

While living on Pine Ridge Reservation, Standing Soldier continued to paint in watercolor. His also illustrated many children's primer books for the Bureau of Indian Affairs. These books, intended for use in Reservation schools, were either written in English, like The Slim Butte Raccoon, or with English and a native language, such as Dakota or Navajo, like 1942's Singing Sioux Cowboy.

In 1961 Standing Soldier, and his family moved to Gordon, Nebraska, where he met and became friends with Douglas Borman. He set up a studio in the showroom of Borman's auto dealership, where much of his work was purchased by Borman and displayed.

== Personal life ==
In 1938, Standing Soldier married Lema Standing Soldier (née Brown / Bad Wound; born 1920), with whom he had 6 children.

Standing Soldier died on March 12, 1967 at Saint Joseph Hospital in Omaha, Nebraska aged 50. On March 17, 1967 a funeral for Standing Soldier took place in Wanblee, Pine Ridge Indian Reservation followed by a burial in Hisle, Pine Ridge Indian Reservation.
