= Béésh bąąh dah siʼání =

The Navajo phrase Béésh bąąh dah siʼání may refer to:

- Navajo Nation Council, the legislative of the Navajo Nation
- Navajo Nation Council Chamber, historical landmark and legislative building in Window Rock, Arizona
