= Rufina Vigil =

American painter

- Sah Wa
- Education: studied with Dorothy Dunn
- Alma mater: Santa Fe Indian School
- Known for: genre painting
- Notable work: Mass at the Fiesta

Women Gathering Guaco, 1935, figurative painting by Rufina Vigil.

Rufina Vigil, also called Sah Wa, was an Puebloan-American painter from the Tesuque Pueblo tribe, part of the Eight Northern Pueblos. Active in the 1930s, she studied under Dorothy Dunn at the Santa Fe Indian School. At one time she worked as a drafter in Los Alamos, New Mexico. Vigil's paintings depict Tesuque life, including women gathering guaco and firing pottery. Her 1936 painting Mass at Fiesta is one of the earliest depictions of Catholic Church rituals by an indigenous North American painter.

Vigil was a genre painter, who painted daily and ceremonial life at Tesuque Pueblo. Vigil's work has been described as "painted in a deliberate, independent style" that depicts everyday life at the pueblo, and "women's roles in her community in the 1930s." Dorothy Dunn wrote of Vigil: "She had great patience with fine detail and was adept at composition."

Her painting, Mass at the Fiesta, was exhibited at the National Gallery of Art in the 1953 Contemporary American Indian Painting exhibition, that later traveled through Europe to various venues. The painting portrays women wearing long, colorfully patterned prayer shawls and traditional leggings of white deerskin. The men in the painting are portrayed with their hair tied in traditional knots of the pueblo style, and wearing silver concha belts at their waists.

== Collections ==
Vigil's work is in the Anne Forbes Collection at the Smithsonian Institution, and the Museum of New Mexico.
