= Sybil Yazzie =

American painter (1916–2002)

Sybil Lansing Yazzie Baldwin
- Born: May 14, 1916; Chinle, Arizona
- Died: November 25, 2002 (aged 86)
- Citizenship: Diné (Navajo)

Sybil Lansing Yazzie Baldwin (May 14, 1916 – November 25, 2002) was a Diné (Navajo) painter active in the 1930s.

== About ==
Yazzie was a pupil of Dorothy Dunn at the Santa Fe Indian School (SFIS), considered the birthplace of contemporary Native American easel painting. In annual student exhibitions of 1935, 1936, and 1937 at SFIS, critics such as Olive Rush and Frederic Douglas described Yazzie's work as "sensitive" and "outstanding", and showing "a miniature style of great beauty". While she was still a student at SFIS in 1937, her 1935 work A Crowd at a Navajo N'Da-a in tempera on paper, was exhibited in London and Paris. One critic said that it was "not naive and childish, but a finished work of art, expert in craftsmanship, intricate in detail, and unerring in color." Yazzie's work was also exhibited at the Museum of Northern Arizona in 1970 and at the Wheelwright Museum of the American Indian in 2009–10. Her address was given in 1968 as the Garcia Store in Chinle, Arizona, but little has been recorded of her career after leaving the SFIS. Yazzie's 1935 watercolor Navajo Weavers is owned by the Newark Museum. A gouache from 1937, Yeibechai, is in the collection of the Smith College Museum of Art.

Yazzie died on November 25, 2002, aged 86.
