= Augustine Abeyta =

American painter

- Born: Augustine Andres Abeyta; 1914; Tesuque Pueblo, New Mexico
- Died: 1971 (aged 56–57)

Augustine Abeyta (c. 1914–1971) was a Puebloan-American painter from Tesuque Pueblo, New Mexico. In October 1937, his work was exhibited at the American Indian Exposition and Congress in Tulsa, Oklahoma. Abeyta was the son of Julio Abeyta, a silversmith and one-time governor of Tesuque Pueblo, and the brother of Crucita Abeyta, a potter known for her jars and bowls.
