= Whitecone, Arizona =

Whitecone, Arizona Baaʼoogeedí
- CDP
- Location of Whitecone in Navajo County, Arizona.

- Location in Arizona Location in the United States
- Coordinates: 35°36′17″N 110°4′48″W
- Country: United States
- State: Arizona
- County: Navajo

Area
  - Total: 45.11 sq mi (116.84 km^{2})
  - Land: 45.10 sq mi (116.80 km^{2})
  - Water: 0.015 sq mi (0.04 km^{2})
- Elevation: 6,086 ft (1,855 m)

Population (2020)
  - Total: 768
  - Density: 17.0/sq mi (6.58/km^{2})
- Time zone: UTC-7 (MST (no DST))
- FIPS code: 04-82390
- GNIS feature ID: 2582901

Whitecone (Navajo: Baaʼoogeedí) is a census-designated place in Navajo County, in the U.S. state of Arizona. The population was 817 at the 2010 census.

== Demographics ==
Historical population
Census	Pop.	Note	%±
2010	817		—
2020	768		−6.0%
U.S. Decennial Census

As of the census of 2010, there were 817 people, 225 households, and 184 families living in the CDP. The racial makeup of the CDP was 96.8% Native American, 0.4% White, 0.4% Asian, 0.4% Pacific Islander, 0.1% from other races, and 2.0% from two or more races. 3.2% of the population were Hispanic or Latino of any race.

There were 225 households, out of which 36% had children under the age of 18 living with them, 46.2% were married couples living together, 25.3% had a female householder with no husband present, and 18.2% were non-families. 17.8% of all households were made up of individuals, and 5.8% had someone living alone who was 65 years of age or older. The average household size was 3.36 and the average family size was 4.10.

== Education ==
A portion is in the Cedar Unified School District and a portion is in the Holbrook Unified School District. The latter portion is zoned to Holbrook High School.

== Notable people ==
- Harrison Begay, Navajo painter, was born in Whitecone.
- Sherwin Bitsui, Navajo writer, is from Whitecone.
