= Gerónima Cruz Montoya =

Native American painter from New Mexico (1915–2015)

- Potsunu
- Born: Gerónima Cruz; September 22, 1915; Ohkay Owingeh, New Mexico
- Died: January 2, 2015 (aged 99); Albuquerque, New Mexico
- Citizenship: Ohkay Owingeh Pueblo and American
- Education: The Studio School
- Known for: Painting
- Style: Studio Flatstyle painting
- Awards: Santa Fe Living Treasure (2004),

Gerónima Cruz Montoya (Potsunu) (September 22, 1915 – January 2, 2015) was an Ohkay Owingeh Pueblo artist and educator from New Mexico. She taught Native American artists at the Studio at the Santa Fe Indian School.

== Early life and education ==
Cruz Montoya's parents were Pablo Cruz and Crucita Trujillo, both of Ohkay Owingeh, New Mexico, where she was born. Her Tewa name is "Potsunu" (Tewa: Pʼoetsunų), meaning "shell", and it is with this name that she signs her work. Her mother was a well-respected potter, and it was from her that Montoya learned the basics. She then studied at the Santa Fe Indian School with Dorothy Dunn, from which she graduated as the valedictorian in her class in 1935, and at Claremont College.

== Career ==
Montoya taught painting at the Santa Fe Indian School from 1937 until 1961. While Dorothy Dunn was known for developing the Studio program at the Indian School, 1932–37, Montoya was the first Native American to teach painting there for over 24 years. One of the students at the School during her time there was Tonita Peña's son Joe Herrera.

== Death and legacy ==
For her work as both teacher and painter, Montoya was awarded the 1994 Art and Cultural Achievement Award by the National Museum of the American Indian. In 1963 Montoya started an art education program at Ohkay Owingeh and in 1968 she founded the Oke'Oweege Artistic Cooperative there. Montoya died on January 2, 2015, at the age of 99.
