= Pablita Velarde =

American painter (1918–2006)

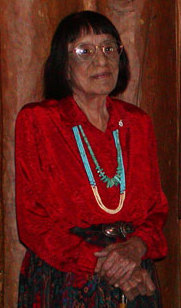
- Velarde in 2003
- Born: Tse Tsan; September 19, 1918; Santa Clara Pueblo, New Mexico
- Died: January 12, 2006 (aged 87); Albuquerque, New Mexico, USA
- Citizenship: American (Santa Clara Pueblo)
- Education: Dorothy Dunn, Santa Fe Studio Art School
- Known for: American Indian painting, Pueblo art
- Spouse: Herbert Hardin
- Children: 3
- Awards: Palmes Académiques

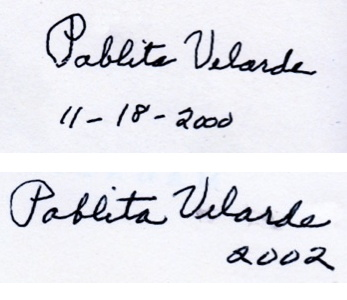

Pablita Velarde (September 19, 1918 – January 12, 2006) born Tse Tsan (Tewa: "Golden Dawn") was an American Pueblo artist and painter.

== Early life and education ==
Velarde was born on Santa Clara Pueblo near Española, New Mexico on September 19, 1918. After the death of her mother, when Velarde was about five years old, she and two of her sisters were sent to St Catherine's Indian School in Santa Fe. At the age of fourteen, she was accepted to Dorothy Dunn's Santa Fe Studio School at the Santa Fe Indian School and was one of the first women students. There, she became an accomplished painter in the Dunn style, known as "flatstyle" painting. Concerned about the rapid changes in native lifestyles, she described the School's flat painting narrative style as "memory paintings" which could help preserve older ways of life. In her early classes she befriended artist Tonita Peña, who influenced her style.

== Work ==
Velarde's early paintings were exclusively watercolors, but later in life she learned how to prepare paints from natural pigments using a process similar to, but not the same as fresco secco. She used these paints to produce what she called "earth paintings". She obtained pigments from minerals and rocks, which she ground on a metate and mano until the result was a powdery substance from which she made her paints.

In 1939, Velarde was commissioned by the National Park Service, under a grant from the Works Progress Administration (WPA), to depict scenes of traditional Pueblo life for visitors to the Bandelier National Monument. Following her work at Bandelier, Velarde went on to become one of the most accomplished Native American painters of her generation, with solo exhibitions throughout the United States, including in her native New Mexico, as well as in Florida and California. Her mural commissions were funded by the WPA.

In 1960, she published a book which features six Tewa tribal stories, "Old Father the Story Teller".

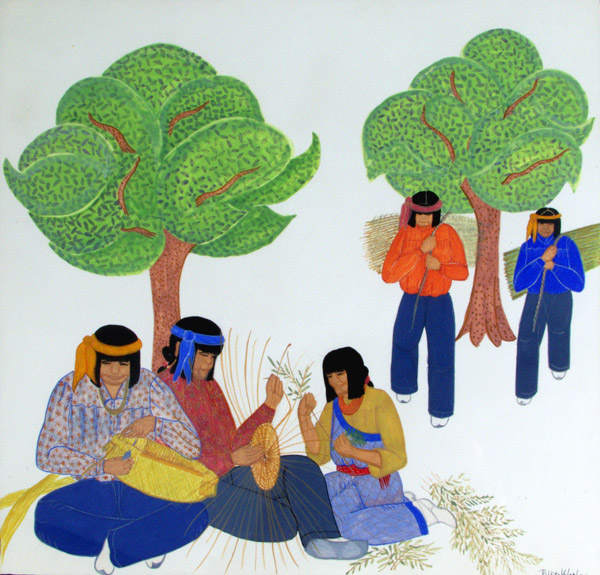
Basketmaking, c. 1940, by Pablita Velarde

In a 1979 interview she said, "Painting was not considered women's work in my time. A woman was supposed to be just a woman, like a housewife and a mother and chief cook. Those were things I wasn't interested in."

Velarde's work is exhibited in public and private collections including the Bandelier National Monument museum, the Museum of Indian Arts and Culture, the Avery Collection at the Arizona State Museum, the Ruth and Charles Elkus Collection of Native American Art, and in the Smithsonian National Museum of Natural History.

Margarete Bagshaw founded in 2012 the Pablita Velarde Museum of Indian Women dedicated to her grandmother's legacy as well as other female Native American artists in Santa Fe, however it closed in 2015 when Margarete died.

== Personal life ==
In 1942, Velarde married Herbert Hardin, a graduate of the University of California who she had known for some time. The couple had two children and lived in the Sandia Mountains outside of Albuquerque in New Mexico. Her daughter, Helen Hardin, and her granddaughter Margarete Bagshaw became prominent artists in their own right.

== Awards and honors ==
In 1953, she was the first woman to receive the Grand Purchase Award at the Philbrook Museum of Art's Annual Exhibition of Contemporary Indian Painting. In 1954 the French government honored Velarde and eleven other Native American artists and craftsman with the Palmes Académiques for excellence in art, this was the first foreign honors paid to Native American artists. The other artists awarded this honor included; Harrison Begay, Allan Houser, Marie Martinez, Awa Tsireh, Velino Herrera, Joe H. Herrera, Severa Tafoya, Ambrose Koannorse, Andrew Tsihnahjinnie, Fred Kabotie, and James Kewannywtewa.

- 1953 - Grand Purchase Award, Annual Exhibition of Contemporary Indian Painting, Philbrook Museum of Art
- 1954 - Ordre des Palmes Académiques, Palmes Académiques
- 1977 - New Mexico Governor's Award
- 1988 - Santa Fe Living Treasure
- 1990 - Lifetime Achievement Award - national Women's Caucus for Art

== See also ==
- List of Native American artists
- Visual arts by indigenous peoples of the Americas

== Bibliography ==
- Tisdale, Shelby (2012). Pablita Velarde: In Her Own Words. Santa Fe, Little Standing Spruce Publishing. ISBN 978-0-9857636-0-2.
- Velarde, Pablita (1960). Old Father Story Teller. Dale King.
- Nelson, Mary Carroll (1971). Pablita Velarde. Minneapolis, Dillon Press. ISBN 0-87518-037-X.
- Hyer, Sally (1993). "Woman's Work": The Art of Pablita Velarde. Santa Fe, NM, Wheelwright Museum of the American Indian.
- Ruch, Marcella J.; Velarde, Pablita (2001). Pablita Velarde: Painting Her People. Santa Fe, New Mexico Magazine. ISBN 0-937206-67-9.
