= Gerald Nailor Sr. =

American painter

Gerald Nailor
- Toh Yah
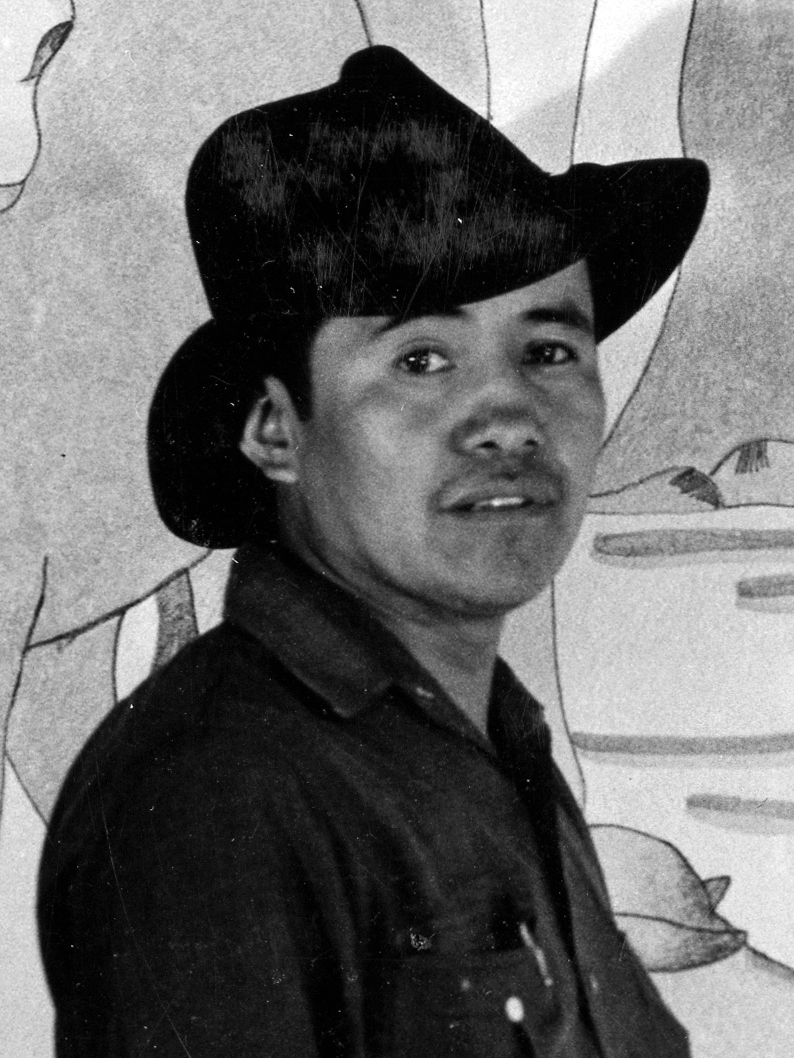
- Nailor in 1943
- Born: January 21, 1917; Pinedale, New Mexico
- Died: August 13, 1952 (aged 35)
- Education: Dorothy Dunn's Studio, Santa Fe Indian School
- Alma mater: University of Oklahoma
- Known for: Painting
- Style: Santa Fe Studio Style
- Spouse: Santana Simbola

Gerald Nailor Sr. (or Toh Yah (Navajo: Tóyá); January 21, 1917 – August 13, 1952) was a Navajo Studio painter from Picurís, New Mexico. Beginning in 1942, he was commissioned to paint the history of the Navajo people for a large mural at the Navajo Nation Council Chamber, which has been designated a National Historic Landmark.

== Background ==
Gerald Nailor was born in 1917 in Pinedale, New Mexico. His Navajo name is Toh Yah (Walking By the River). He attended the Albuquerque Indian School from 1930 to 1934. He then attended the Santa Fe Indian School, where he studied art under Dorothy Dunn from 1935 to 1937. After working under Dunn, Nailor spent a year studying with Kenneth M. Chapman and the Swedish muralist Olle Nordmark.

== Marriage and family ==
Nailor met his future wife, Santana Simbola, who was working as a nurse at the Santa Fe Indian Hospital. Upon marrying, they relocated to Picuris Pueblo, New Mexico, where they reared their five children. Their son Gerald Nailor Jr. also became an artist.

== Career ==
Quail by Gerald Nailor, serigraph, 1951. Note stylized sideoats grama grass in background..

In 1937, with his good friend the artist Allan Houser (Chiricahua Apache), he set up a studio in Santa Fe to paint and work on his silkscreen prints.

With fellow-artist and classmate Harrison Begay, Nailor founded "Tewa Enterprises", an art publishing firm specializing in Native American art, especially that of the two founders. Tewa Enterprises became known for the high quality of their silkscreen prints.

In 1939, Nailor, Houser and Velino Shije Herrera were commissioned by the Section of Painting and Sculpture to paint murals in the Main Interior Building in Washington, D.C.

In 1942, Nailor was selected for the commission for a mural for the Navajo Nation Council Chamber in Window Rock, Arizona, to depict the history of the Navajo people. He was one of thousands who applied for the job, which officials expected to take 3–5 years. In 2004, the building (and its mural) was declared a National Historic Landmark.

Works by Nailor are held by the Arizona State Museum, University of Arizona, California Academy of Sciences, Gilcrease Museum, Heard Museum, Fred Jones Museum of Art, Museum of Indian Arts and Culture, Museum of Northern Arizona, Museum of the American Indian, Philbrook Museum of Art, Millicent Rogers Museum, Southwest Museum and the Woolaroc Museum.
