= Tesuque, New Mexico =

- CDP
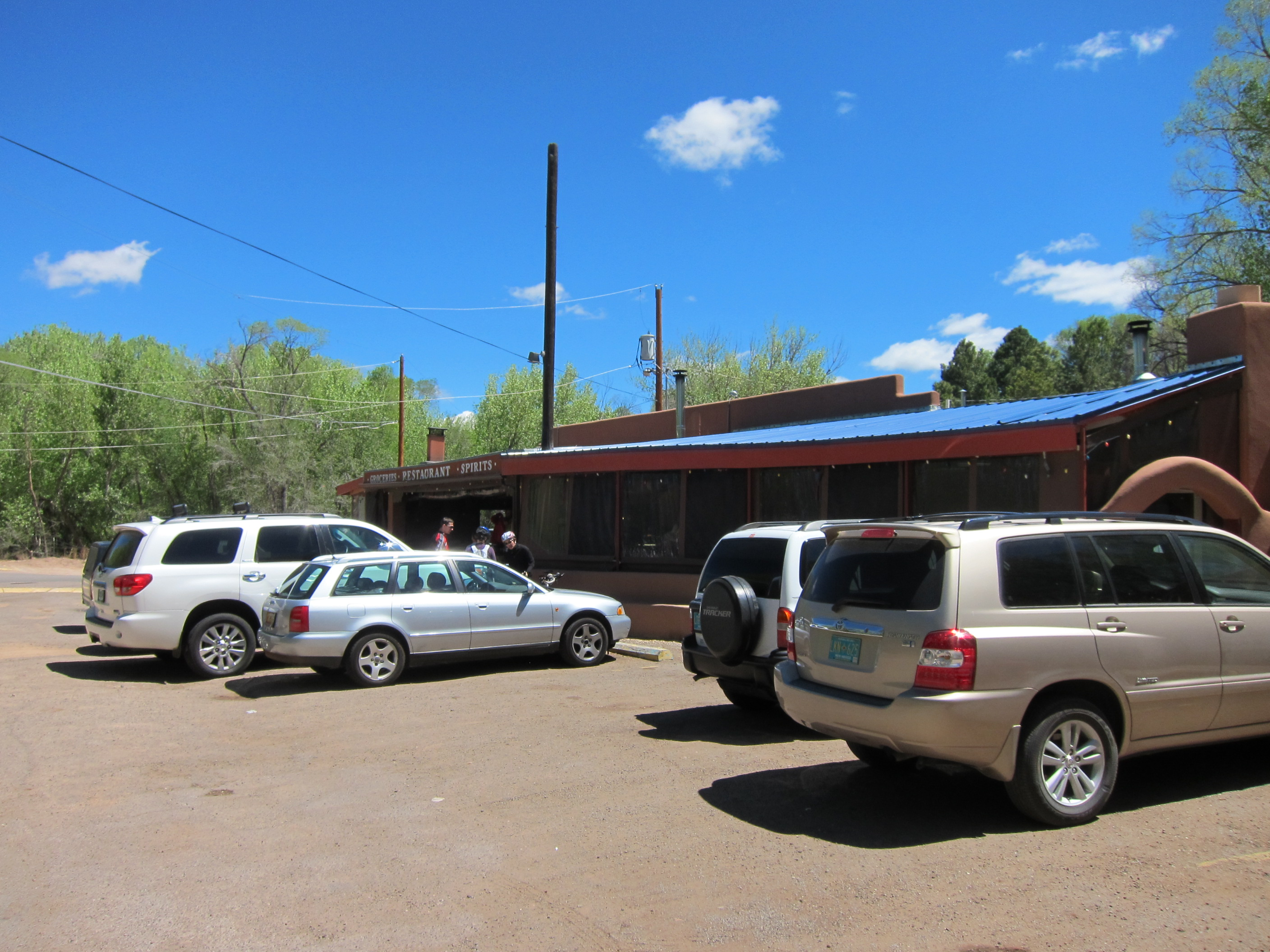
- Tesuque Village Market

- Location of Tesuque, New Mexico

- Location in the United States
- Coordinates: 35°45′25″N 105°55′30″W
- Country: United States
- State: New Mexico
- County: Santa Fe

Area
  - Total: 5.66 sq mi (14.65 km^{2})
  - Land: 5.66 sq mi (14.65 km^{2})
  - Water: 0 sq mi (0.00 km^{2})
- Elevation: 6,929 ft (2,112 m)

Population (2020)
  - Total: 1,094
  - Density: 193.4/sq mi (74.66/km^{2})
- Time zone: UTC-7 (Mountain (MST))
  - Summer (DST): UTC-6 (MDT)
- ZIP code: 87574
- Area code: 505
- FIPS code: 35-77040
- GNIS feature ID: 2410071

Tesuque (Note: /təˈsuːki/ tə-SOO-kee) is a census-designated place (CDP) in Santa Fe County, New Mexico, United States. It is part of the Santa Fe, New Mexico, Metropolitan Statistical Area. The population was 1,094 at the 2020 census. The area is separate from but located near Tesuque Pueblo, a member of the Eight Northern Pueblos.

== Geography ==
According to the United States Census Bureau, the CDP has a total area of 7.0 square miles (18 km^{2}), all land.

== Demographics ==
Historical population
Census	Pop.	Note	%±
2020	1,094		—
U.S. Decennial Census

As of the census of 2000, there were 909 people, 455 households, and 249 families residing in the CDP. The population density was 130.6 inhabitants per square mile (50.4/km^{2}). There were 541 housing units at an average density of 77.7 per square mile (30.0/km^{2}). The racial makeup of the CDP was 75.25% White, 0.44% African American, 0.44% Native American, 0.77% Asian, 18.37% from other races, and 4.73% from two or more races. Hispanic or Latino of any race were 35.64% of the population.

There were 455 households, out of which 16.7% had children under the age of 18 living with them, 43.5% were married couples living together, 8.1% had a female householder with no husband present, and 45.1% were non-families. 38.2% of all households were made up of individuals, and 8.8% had someone living alone who was 65 years of age or older. The average household size was 2.00 and the average family size was 2.61.

In the CDP, the population was spread out, with 14.7% under the age of 18, 4.7% from 18 to 24, 23.8% from 25 to 44, 41.3% from 45 to 64, and 15.5% who were 65 years of age or older. The median age was 48 years. For every 100 females, there were 89.0 males. For every 100 females age 18 and over, there were 88.6 males.

The median income for a household in the CDP was $36,029, and the median income for a family was $80,043. Males had a median income of $43,833 versus $42,650 for females. The per capita income for the CDP was $52,473. About 7.3% of families and 12.6% of the population were below the poverty line, including none of those under age 18 and 29.5% of those age 65 or over.

== Education ==
Tesuque is within the Santa Fe Public Schools district.

It is zoned to Tesuque Elementary School, Milagro Middle School, and Santa Fe High School.

== Notable people ==
- Augustine Abeyta, painter
- Carlene Carter, singer and songwriter
- Howie Epstein, American musician
- Lynne and Dennis Comeau, shoe designers
- Dominic Frontiere, composer
- Ali MacGraw, actress and model
- Armistead Maupin, author
- Cormac McCarthy, author
- Anthony Michaels-Moore, opera singer
- Eliot Porter, nature photographer who lived in Tesuque.
- Michael Tobias, author
- Carol Jean Vigil, New Mexico's first female Native American state court judge
- Rufina Vigil, painter

== Cultural references ==
Tesuque is mentioned in Willa Cather's 1927 novel Death Comes for the Archbishop. There is a passing mention of Tesuque in chapter 6 of the 1932 novel Brave New World by Aldous Huxley. Tesuque is mentioned in Walker Percy's 1966 novel The Last Gentleman. Michael Tobias' 2005 novel, The Adventures of Marigold, is set in Tesuque. Tesuque is also mentioned in the 2016 Stuart Woods novel "Dishonorable Intentions". The final episode of the crime drama series Breaking Bad has scenes in Tesuque or near the Santa Fe Opera. The penultimate episode of the second season of the animated comedy drama series BoJack Horseman is set in Tesuque.
