= Pop Wea =

Native American potter and painter

- Died: 1966
- Known for: Pottery and painting

Buffalo in snow, painting by Pop Wea, c. 1960s

Pop Wea, also known as Lori Tanner, Lorie Tanner, Lo Ree Tanner, Lo Rie Tanner, Loree Tanner and Lo Rei Tanner (died 1966), was a Native American artist associated with the Taos Pueblo. She was a painter and potter. Pop Wea is listed in the Biographical Directory of Native American Painters, and in American Indian Painters: a Biographical Directory.

== Work ==
Pop Wea's work titled Taos Warrior Dance (casein on board) is on display at the Arizona State Museum at the University of Arizona. Her work has been described as dramatic and non-traditional, for example her work Buffalo in snow. Her paintings were sometimes executed in a "three dimensional style." In 1965, her work Eagle Dance received first prize in painting in the Scottsdale Indian Art Exhibition; it was described in a review as having "startling calligraphy on a black ground."

Pop Wea's work was exhibited in 1962 at the Museum of Northern Arizona, and at the Heard Museum in 1967.

Pop Wea has been described as a "promising artist who died young." Pop Wea's reputation as an artist was established in 1963 following an exhibition in Gallup, New Mexico; she unexpectedly died three years later.

== Collections ==
Pop Wea's work is in the James T. Bialac Collection of Southwest Paintings at the Arizona State Museum. Her work is included in several private collections.

== Personal life ==
Pop Wea was the niece of another Taos Pueblo artist, Pop Chalee.
