= Hisle, South Dakota =

Unincorporated community in South Dakota, U.S.

Coordinates: 43°24′21″N 101°45′07″W

Hisle is an unincorporated community in Jackson County, in the U.S. state of South Dakota.

== History ==
A post office called Hisle was established in 1923, and remained in operation until 1971. The name Hisle was coined by shortening and altering the name of local pioneer William Highshield.
