= Navajo Nation Council Chamber =

Government center in the Southwestern US

- Navajo Nation Council Chamber; Béésh bąąh dah si'ání (Navajo)
- U.S. National Register of Historic Places
- U.S. National Historic Landmark
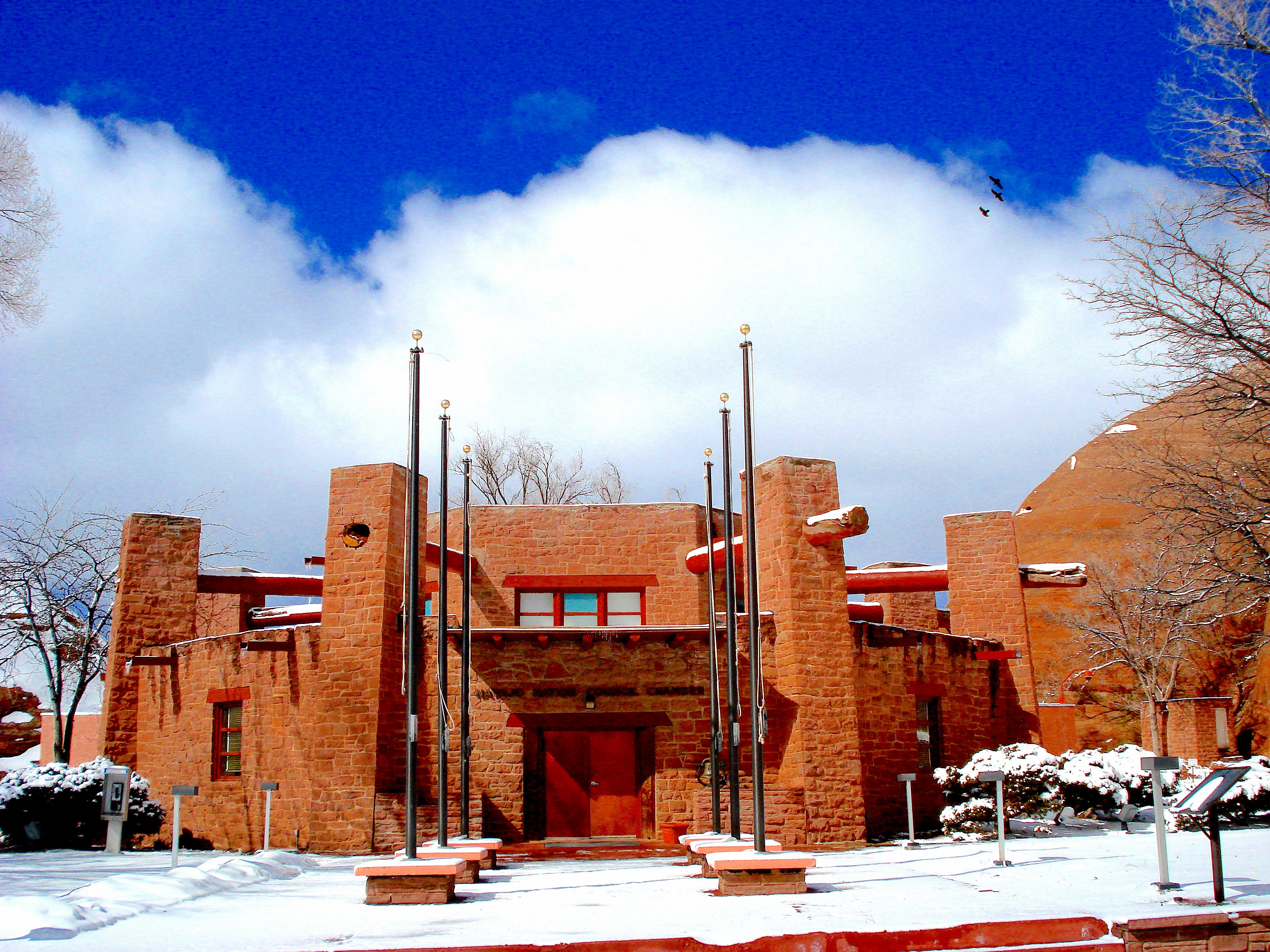

- Location within Arizona Location within the United States
- Location: Window Rock, Arizona
- Coordinates: 35°40′58″N 109°2′54″W
- Area: 1.6 acres (0.65 ha)
- Built: 1935
- Architect: Mayers Murray & Phillip (Goodhue); Navajo Craftsman
- Architectural style: Pueblo Revival, rustic
- NRHP reference No.: 04001155

Significant dates
- Added to NRHP: August 18, 2004
- Designated NHL: August 18, 2004

Navajo Nation Council Chamber (Navajo: Béésh bąąh dah si'ání) is the center of government for the Navajo Nation. The landmark building, in Window Rock, Arizona, is significant for its association with the 1930s New Deal, and its change in federal policy for relations with Native Americans, as established in the Indian Reorganization Act. With its red sandstone façade and overall rustic architectural style, the chamber was designed to harmonize with its spectacular natural surroundings. The building was declared a National Historic Landmark in 2004. It is "the only legislative headquarters in the United States owned by an American Indian tribe which has been continuously in use by that tribe and whose design incorporates indigenous materials and architectural traditions tied to the Navajo heritage."

== Description and history ==
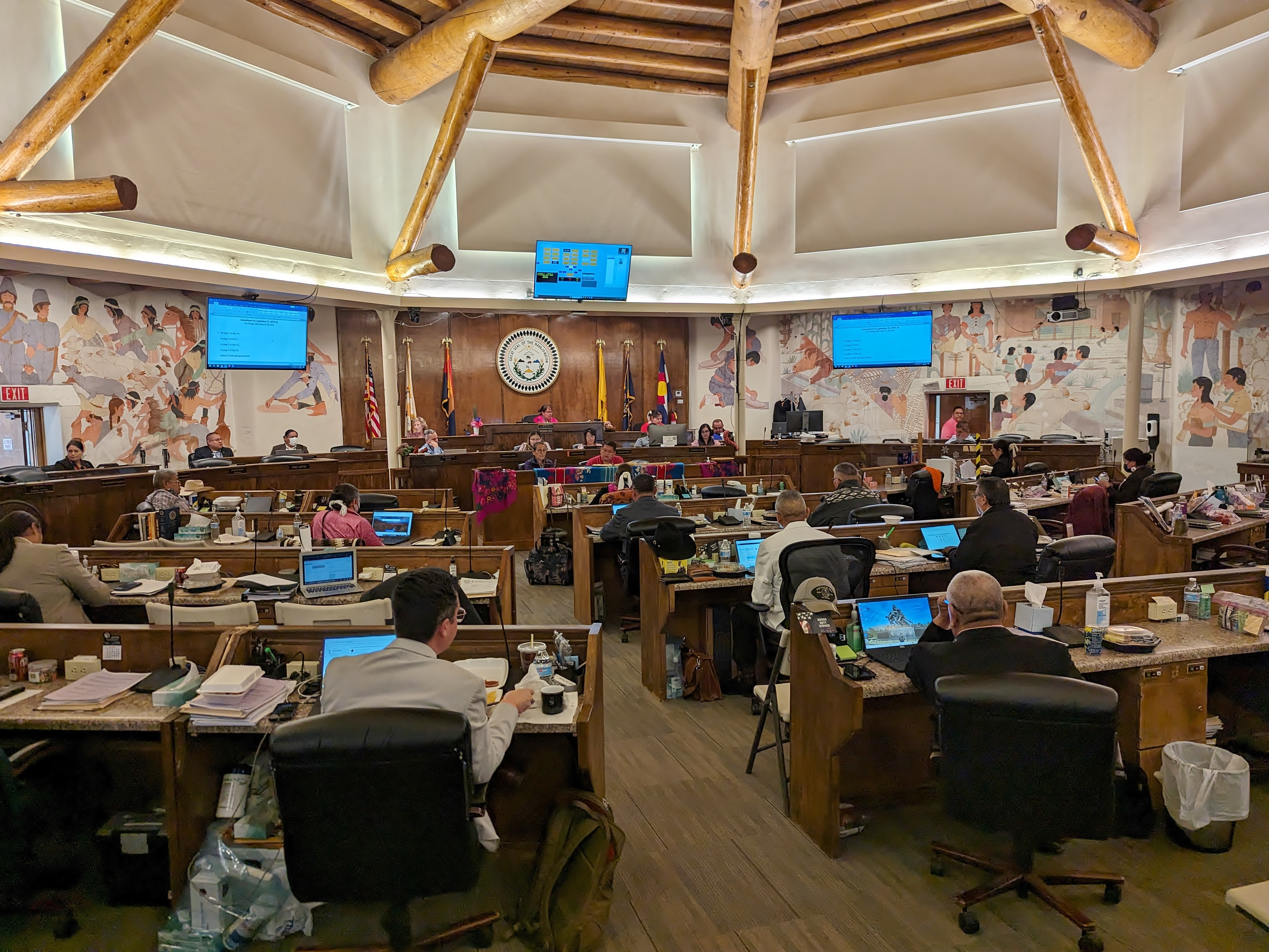
Interior during a session

The Navajo Nation Council Chamber stands amid a campus of other Navajo Nation government facilities in Window Rock, on the south side of Tribal Hill Road, sited with a view of the stone arch formation that gives Window Rock its name. It is a two-level stone structure, built out of red sandstone designed to harmonize with the surrounding sandstone formations. It is octagonal in shape, its design intended to evoke a monumental hogan, the traditional building form of the Navajo people. Ponderosa pine vigas radiate outward to stone buttresses, and heavy wooden timbers serve as lintels and trim. The main entrance faces east (a traditional Navajo orientation), with flanking seven-foot wooden panels carved by the Navajo artist Charles Shirley. At the center of the structure is an octagonal clerestory level. The interior is a single large chamber, with steel columns supporting smaller vigas tied to the larger ones which support the roof. The Navajo artist Gerald Nailor, Sr. was commissioned in 1942 for a mural cycle depicting The History and Progress of the Navajo Nation, which is installed in the interior.

The site for the building was chosen by John Collier, United States commissioner for Indian affairs, in 1933, and it was erected in 1934–35 with funding from the Public Works Administration. It was designed by Mayers Murray & Phillip of New York City, a firm known for its Mission Revival architecture.

== See also ==
- National Register of Historic Places listings in Apache County, Arizona
- List of National Historic Landmarks in Arizona
