= Mockfjärd =

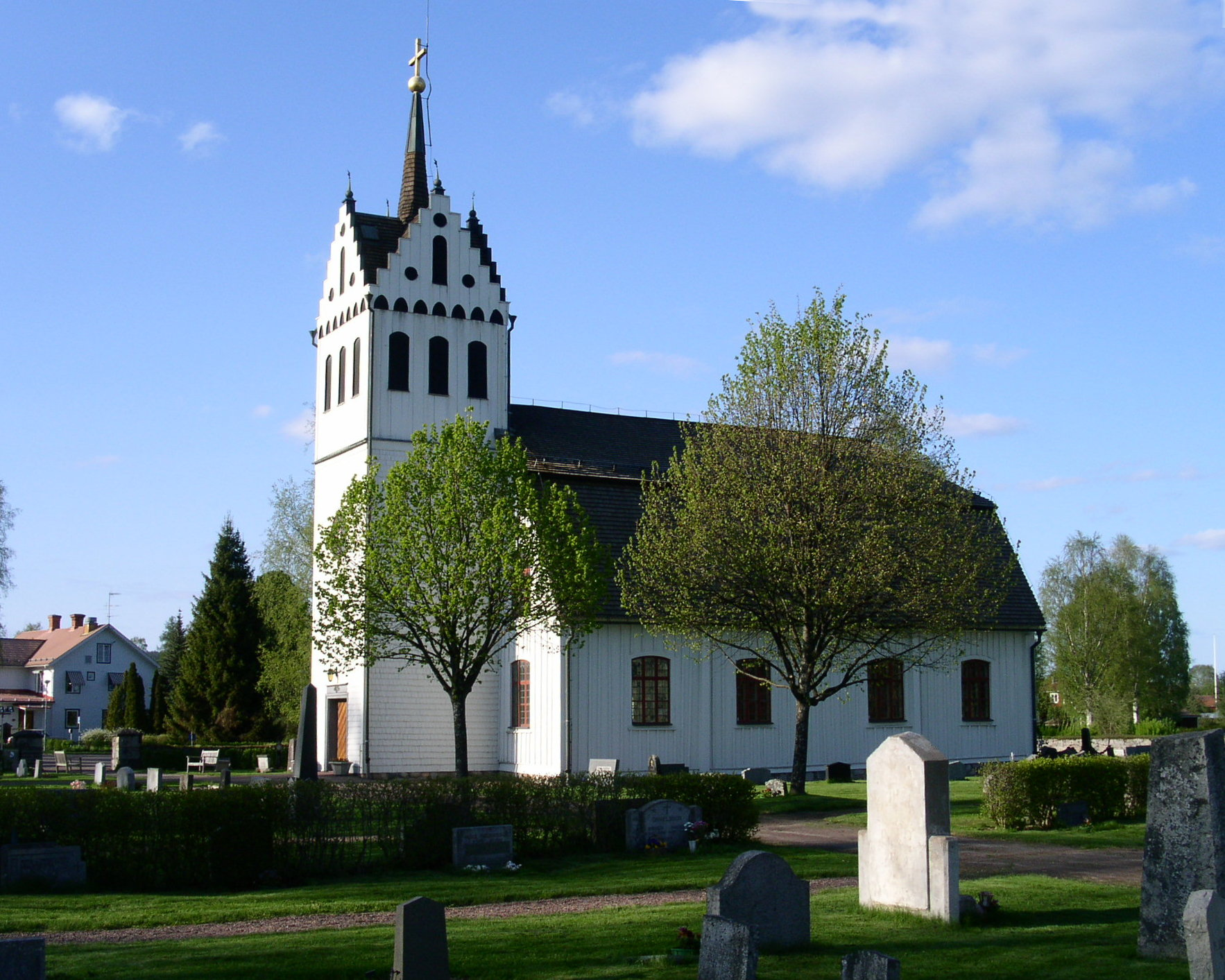
- Mockfjärd church

- Location within Dalarna Location within Sweden
- Coordinates: 60°30′N 14°58′E
- Country: Sweden
- Province: Dalarna
- County: Dalarna County
- Municipality: Gagnef Municipality

Area
  - Total: 3.50 km^{2} (1.35 sq mi)

Population (31 December 2010)
  - Total: 1,937
  - Density: 553/km^{2} (1,430/sq mi)
- Time zone: UTC+1 (CET)
  - Summer (DST): UTC+2 (CEST)

Mockfjärd is a locality situated in Gagnef Municipality, Dalarna County, Sweden with 1,937 inhabitants in 2010 and 1,919 in 2013.

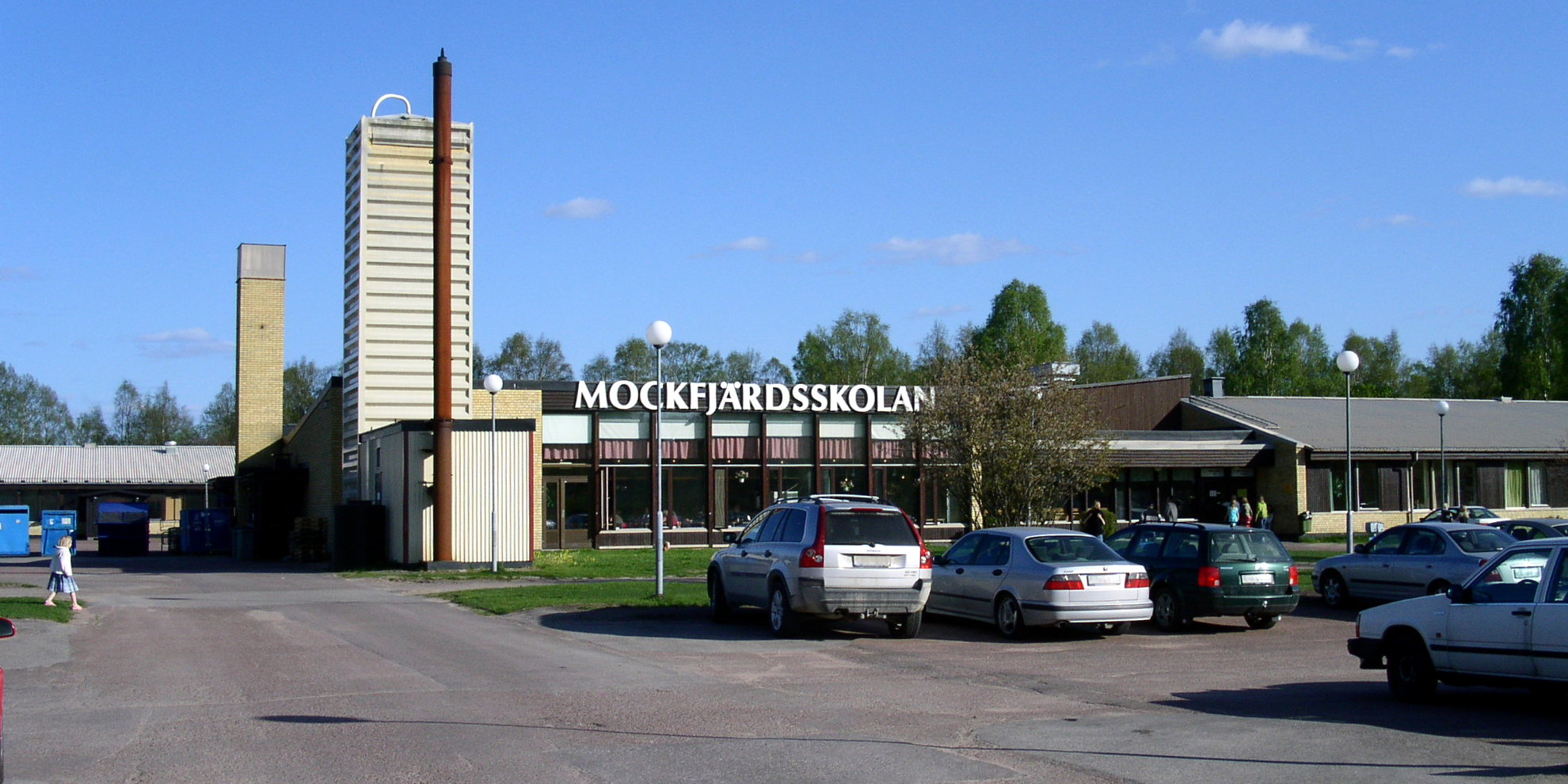
The school in Mockfjärd

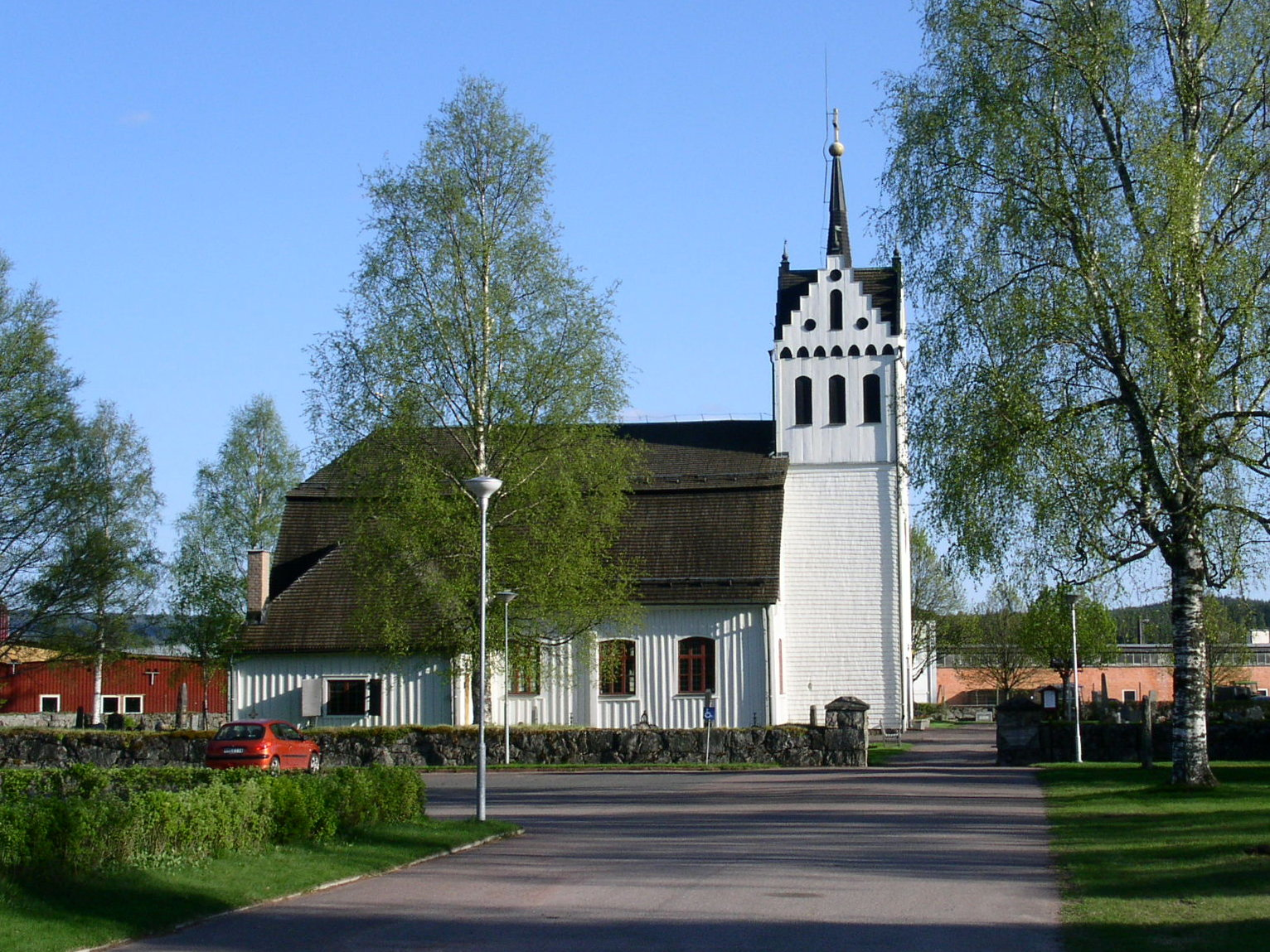
Mockfjärd church

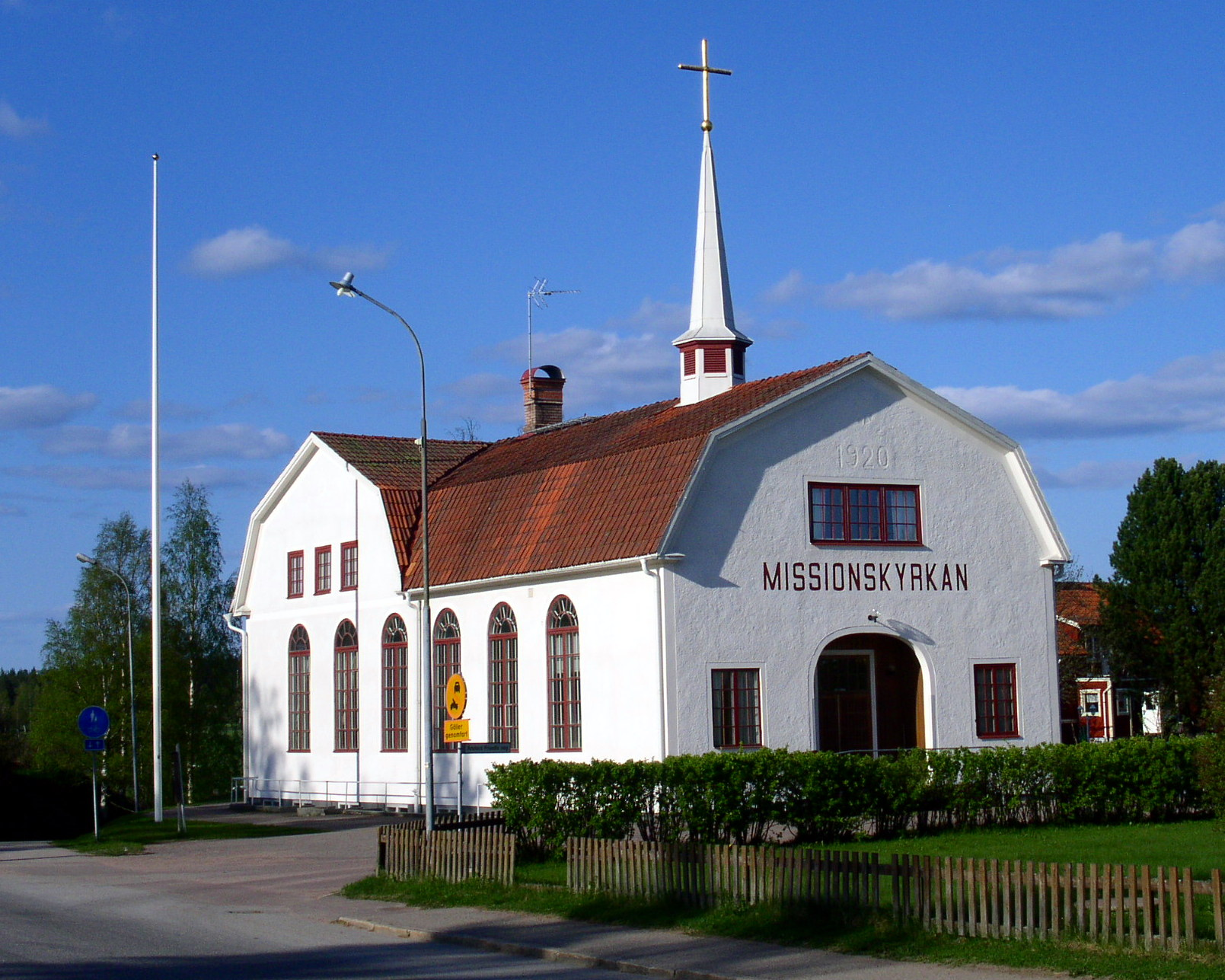
The Missionary Church in Mockfjärd
