= Pop Chalee =

American painter

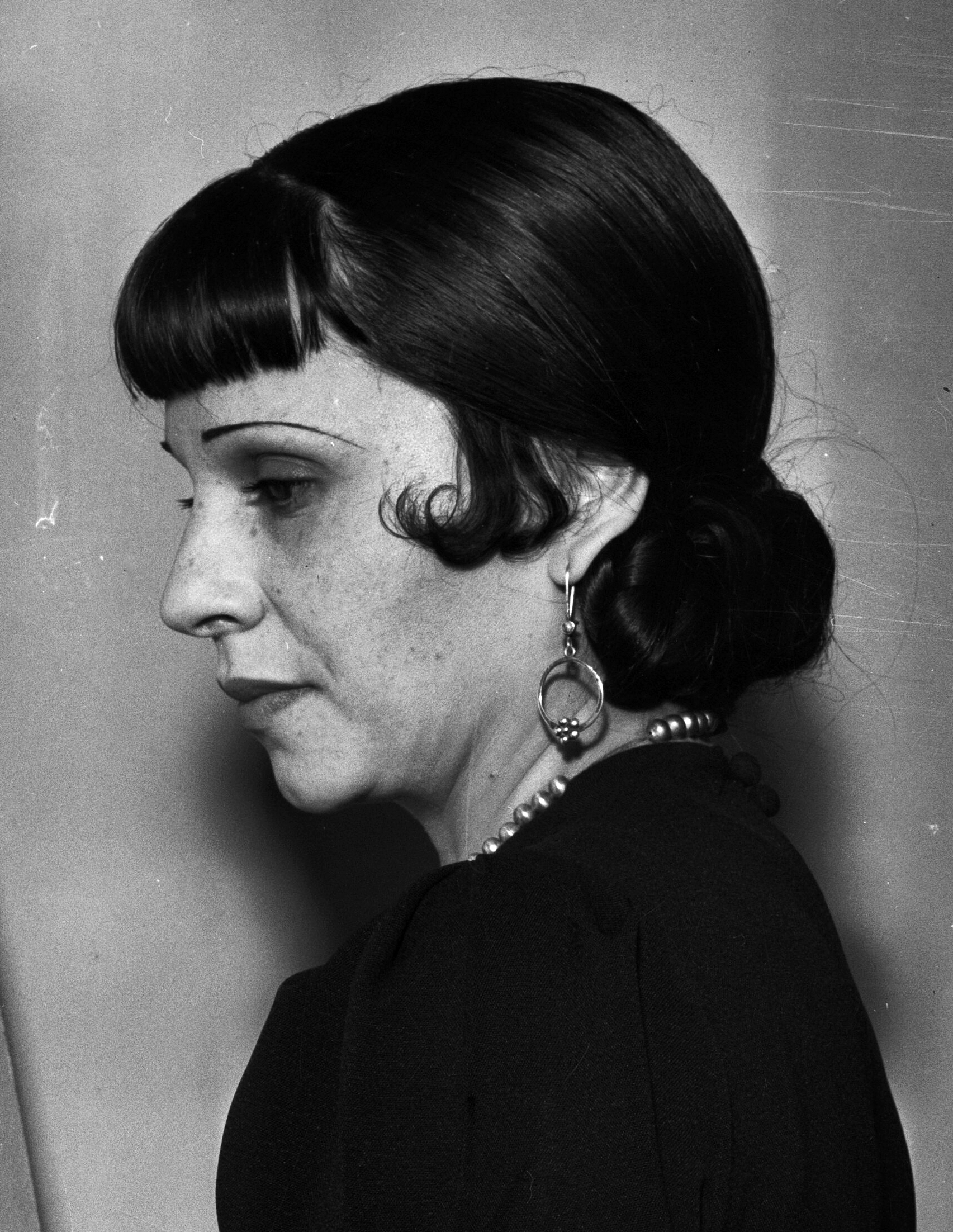
- Chalee in 1939
- Born: Merina Luján; March 20, 1906; Castle Gate, Utah, U.S.
- Died: December 11, 1993 (aged 87); Santa Fe, New Mexico, U.S.
- Education: The Studio; Santa Fe Indian School
- Known for: Painting
- Notable work: Albuquerque airport murals
- Style: Studio style
- Awards: Governor's Award for Excellence in the Arts, 1990

Pop Chalee, also known as Merina Lujan (March 20, 1906 – December 11, 1993), was an American painter, muralist, performer, and singer. In 2021, she was inducted into the National Cowgirl Museum and Hall of Fame.

== Early years ==
Pop Chalee was born on March 20, 1906, in Castle Gate, Utah. Her father, Joseph Cruz Lujan was from Taos Pueblo and her mother Merea Margherete Luenberger, who became known as Myrtle Lujan, was primarily Swiss. Her uncle was Tony Lujan, who had married Mabel Dodge Stern.

In 1910, her brother Lawrence died of scarlet fever. Part of the Lujan family—Joseph, Chalee, and her sisters Mattie and Eva — moved back to the Taos Pueblo soon after their brother's death. Her father was in ill health due to consumption (tuberculosis). Her mother and her sister Wilma did not return to New Mexico. Chalee and her sisters attended the Santa Fe Indian School. Pop Chalee, which means "blue flower", is a Tiwa name given to at the pueblo. Chalee's father married a second time to a woman named Tomacita by 1918.

On the journey back to Utah, she realized that she could not remember what her mother looked like. When they arrived at the station their mother never arrived to get them. After seeking out the help of a family friend they finally found their mother's home but were met with an unwelcome greeting. Chalee recalls their mother turning them away and calling them "little black devils".

== Adult years ==
On July 20, 1922, the artist married Otis Fred Hopkins, a European-American craftsman of wood and metal. As she was starting her married life, international interest was growing for Native American art, which was defined more as the subject of Native Americans and not made by Native Americans. While Native American art shows were traveling around the county, Chalee gave birth to her first son at 18 years old; Jack Cruz (also named Kun Funa or Black Buffalo). Less than two years later, her daughter Betty (named Pop Pina or Red Flower) was born.

Only after a year of living back in Taos, that the Hopkins family moved back to Salt Lake City. This pattern of "shifting from one residence to another continued." During the Great Depression, Native American received increasing national attention. Chalee was not yet part of the movement, but instead she made public appearances in LDS churches on Native American life. "These thematically linked her to her Native American culture".

== Art career ==
Chalee had not considered a career in art until “[a]n unexpected visit in Utah to a fortune teller and a subsequent recurring dream-inspired one of the most dramatic turning points in Pop Chalee's life."

Chalee started with some difficulty as she was much older than most of the students and the only woman for some time. However, her insecurities about her artwork were put to ease by Dorothy Dunn's supportive encouragement and patience. Chalee seemed to enjoy the school and finally settled into her new role as an artist: "I'd always been kind of funny—I never did anything right. I'd try different things like dancing and couldn't make it. But when I got into the art, I just stuck to it until I finally developed myself, then it just kind of opened the gates and I went on." In Chalee's biography by Margaret Cesa, her progress and involvement at "the Studio could be compared to jumping into a raging river, frightened at first and then later enjoying the speed and power of the rapids so much that she never leaves the water."

At the school, Chalee was exposed to art techniques and art history that strengthened her pride in the work of Native American artists. Responding to a lecture given about modern American art, Chalee commented "Some of our Indian artists paint in a style that the white man says can not be done, but still the Indian gets a perfectly balanced picture and the white artist generally puts a lot of unnecessary lines in a picture. We strive to tell a story in our paintings with as few lines as possible and leave out all unnecessary details. It is all done from memory."

After finishing her first year, Chalee began to work at the Laboratory of Anthropology as a paid copyist for Kenneth M. Chapman to document designs from the Laboratory's vast collection of Native American pottery. "These tasks served to increase Pop Chalee's appreciation of Native American arts and heighten her pride in her Pueblo heritage." During this time Chalee was also invited to show her work at an exhibit at Stanford and also contribute to the magazine School Arts.

== Reception and influences ==
During the 1930s, when Chalee was becoming a household name, there was a "dense thicket of misinformation and sensationalism that circulated" about this new and upcoming artist. She was called Princess Popshilee or Princess Blue Flower.

During the Works Progress Administration, she worked for the Indian Division of the Public Works of Art Project, which was funded in 1934. Chalee produced several art works that were distributed around the country.

"Her works are included in numerous museum collections, including the Gilcrease Museum (Tulsa, OK), the Heard Museum and the Millicent Rogers Museum (Taos, New Mexico). Several of her murals are permanently displayed at the Albuquerque Airport." Her mural work is also on the entrance walls of Maisel's Trading Post on Central Avenue in Albuquerque, generated with several Native and non-native painters in 1939.

Known for her mystical horses and enchanted forests, she also painted scenes from her participation in the Native American Church at Taos. Her paintings can be described as ephemeral. "Pop Chalee transformed a traditional style of painting to create magical, idyllic images of wide-eyed animals, ceremonial figures, and woodland settings."

In her mythical horse paintings, Chalee paints a dreamlike and whimsical horse. Although space is rendered in a clearly two-dimensional style, the horses have such energy and movement. "Her treatment of the horse is mythically stylized with elongated legs and long swirling manes and tails. These horses evoke a Taos story of a stallion that watches over the Pueblo at night."

In addition to mystical horses, Chalee's forest compositions often teemed with frolicking deer as well. It has been proposed that Pop Chalee's work might well have served as the direct inspiration for the 1942 American animated drama film by Walt Disney, Bambi. Chalee has in fact been called a "Bambi painter." Pop Chalee's magical forest fantasies were exhibited at Stanford University in 1936. It is notable that the sketches for Bambi did not commence until 1937 prior to the film's 1941 release.

Rhythm and movement of ceremonial dance had a strong influence on Chalee and her art; "the rhythm the Indian has, I just go out of this world with it, and the drumbeat, your heart is beating with them, with the rhythm of their bodies". When asked if her life at Taos had an identifiable effect on her art, Chalee replied: "[t]hat I couldn't answer, that I don't know, I really don't know. Maybe an outsider could see it, but..." Whether or not Chalee was aware of her influence from her pueblo community, she was clearly affected by the Taos religion. "Ceremonial life, 'based on a belief in the oneness of all living things', provided her with an opportunity to observe 'the delicate balance of the relationship between man and nature.'"

"Museums and galleries sought her exotic and captivating works and she was frequently requested to make personal appearances. Chalee attributed her success as an artist to the encouragement of Mabel Dodge Lujan and the instruction of her admired teacher Dorothy Dunn, to whom she paid tribute throughout her life." While Chalee accredited others for the success of her work, she was also very much a personality and had a wonderful energy that people sought after. In an article published in Southwest Art magazine, Sally Euclaire describes Chalee as a dynamic woman with an image. "Standing tall at well under 5 feet, she sported full bangs and a waist-length braid, body-hugging Capri pants, high-tech sneakers, and New Age crystal jewelry. She was clearly a woman with an image."

== Family and death ==
Pop Chalee died on December 11, 1993, in Santa Fe. She was the aunt of a painter, Pop Wea also known as Lori Tanner, who died in 1966. Pop Chalee's great-granddaughter, Maya Chalee Hopkins who was born in 1978, is also an artist and designer and was greatly influenced by her great-grandmother.
