= Joseph Imhoff =

American painter (1871–1955)

Joseph Imhof (1871–1955) was an American painter.

Though he made his name painting portraits of the Southwest's native peoples, Joseph Imhof was born and raised in New York City. After teaching himself lithography, he was hired by Currier & Ives. He saved up enough money from his job to buy a bookstore, which he later sold to pursue an art education in Europe. He studied in Paris, Brussels, Antwerp and Munich.

A chance meeting with Buffalo Bill Cody in Antwerp changed the focus of his artistic career. He returned to New York and quickly began to record the portraits of Iroquois people in New York and Canada. He built a studio in Albuquerque in 1906 and spent the next few years traveling around the region. In 1929, Imhof and his wife, Sarah, relocated permanently to Taos, New Mexico. There, he made models live in his home for some time before he could paint them. He felt that he needed to know them at a deeper level.
