= Harrison Begay =

American painter (1914/17–2012)

- Born: Haashké yah Níyá c. 15 November 1917; Whitecone, Arizona, U.S.
- Died: 2012; Gilbert, Arizona, U.S.
- Other name: Haskay Yahne Yah
- Education: Santa Fe Indian School; Black Mountain College, Phoenix Junior College
- Spouse: Ramona Espinosa (1940–1945, ended due to divorce)

External image
- "Ancient and Modern Art", a major painting by Begay.

Harrison Begay, also known as Haashké yah Níyá (meaning "Warrior Who Walked Up to His Enemy" or "Wandering Boy") (November 15, 1914 or 1917 – August 18, 2012) was a renowned Diné (Navajo) painter, printmaker, and illustrator. Begay specialized in watercolors, gouache, and silkscreen prints. At the time of his death in 2012, he was the last living, former student of Dorothy Dunn and Geronima C. Montoya at the Santa Fe Indian School. His work has won multiple awards and is exhibited in museums and private collections worldwide and he was among the most famous Diné artists of his generation.

== Early life and education ==
Harrison Begay was born circa 15 November 1917, in Whitecone, Arizona. Begay's birth year has also been recorded as 1914. His parents were Black Rock and Zonnie/Ah-Hin Nil-bah and he had eight siblings. His mother belonged to the Red Forehead Clan, and his father was from the Zuñi Deer Clan. He grew up in a hogan, where he was raised tending goats and sheep.

In 1934, he entered the Santa Fe Indian School to study art at the "Studio School" under Dorothy Dunn. His classmates included Gerald Nailor, Quincy Tahoma, and Andrew Tsihnahjinnie. Begay learned Dunn's characteristic "Studio Style" painting, a type of "Flatstyle". In her book American Indian Painting of the Southwest and Plains Areas, Dunn described Begay's work as "at once decorative and lifelike, his color clear in hue and even in value, his figures placid yet inwardly animated.... [H]e seemed to be inexhaustibly resourceful in a quiet reticent way." Begay was one of the Studio School's star students.

Begay served in the Works Progress Administration's Federal Art Project during the Great Depression era between 1933 and 1943, painting murals. His Federal Art Project work was once housed in the Gallup Arts Center (a WPA Arts Center), which was demolished and the collection was moved to the Octavia Fellin Public Library in Gallup, New Mexico.

During his career, Begay worked in gouache, watercolor, sandpainting, silkscreen painting, and commercial illustration. Most of his works represent genre scenes of Diné (Navajo) life and of natural imagery.

He was married in 1940 to Ramona Espinosa. From 1940 to 1941, Begay attended Black Mountain College in Black Mountain, North Carolina under a scholarship from the Indian Commission. The scholarship allowed him to study architecture for one year at the institution. After he continued studies at Phoenix Junior College.

== Career ==
From 1942 to 1945, during the Second World War, Begay served in the US Army Signal Corps in Germany, Iceland, the Czech Republic, and other parts of continental Europe. Begay took part in the D-Day storming at Normandy Beachhead. He was honorably discharged in 1945 and returned to Santa Fe. In Begay's early artwork, he often depicted hunting and war imagery, but he later moved away from these types of images following his harrowing experiences during World War II.

That same year in 1945, Begay and his wife divorced, and he had financial problems and trouble selling this artwork. He travelled through Colorado, staying in Denver to study with Gerald Curtis Delano. He returned to Arizona in 1947.

In the 1950s, interest in Begay's artwork increased. Critics often categorized his style in this period as Native American "Traditionalism," and praised his work as pure, serene, idealized, and uncomplicated.

In 1951, Begay expanded his artistic horizons by co-founding the Tewa Enterprises in Santa Fe with fellow artist Charles Barrows. This printing company provided another avenue for Begay and Native American artists to disperse their art to a wide audience. Begay took an active role in cutting the screens for his serigraph reproductions. His artwork was easily adapted to the new medium due to his flat forms, delicate lines, and strict fields of color. The low cost of his prints led to the popularization of Begay's paintings to a wide American and European audience. Tewa Enterprises promoted Native American artists and was one of the first companies of its kind.

Begay was close friends with fellow Studio School artist Quincy Tahoma. Following Tahoma's death in 1956, Begay was overcome with grief. In 1959, Begay decided to relocate to the Navajo Nation Reservation to be closer to his family and community.

In the 1960s and 1970s, Begay spent the majority of his time at the Navajo Nation Reservation continuing to make and sell paintings and prints. His work in the 1960s and 1970s represents genre scenes, animals, geographical locations, and natural elements. Begay placed particular emphasis on horses, colts, deer, and fawn. His career was so profitable that he was able to support himself and his family through his art making. Collectors described Begay's work as a "timeless, peaceful and gentle world, recognizing only the beauty in the Navajo way of life." Some scholars deem his paintings to be overly sentimental and romanticizing snapshots of everyday life, dismissing them as "Disney art." Others praise the soft tone and peaceful style of his art as inventive, original, refined, delicate, and detailed.

== Death and legacy ==
Harrison Begay died on 18 August 2012 in Gilbert, Arizona at the age of 95. He was buried in the Fort Defiance Veterans Cemetery in Arizona.

Begay's work has been included in a large number of public museum collections, including the Montclair Art Museum, National Museum of the American Indian, the Museum of Modern Art, the Museum of Northern Arizona, the Heard Museum, the Museum of Indian Arts and Culture, the Wheelwright Museum, the Southwest Museum of the American Indian, the Philbrook Museum, the Gilcrease Museum, the De Young Museum of San Francisco, the Farmington Museum, and many more.

== Publications ==
Books that were illustrated by Begay:

- Clark, Anne Nolan (1957). The Little Indian Basket. Harrison Begay (illustrator). Chicago, IL: Melmont Publishers Inc. – The story follows a young Papago girl as she learns traditional basketry from her grandmother.
- Crowell, Ann (1969). A Hogan for the Bluebird. Weekly Reader Children's Book Club. Harrison Begay (illustrator). New York City, NY: Charles Scribner's Sons; Weekly Reader Children's Book Club.

Books and publications that feature Begay's work:

- Enduring Tradition: Art of the Navajos, by Lois and Jerry Jacka
- Southwest Indian Painting, by Clara Lee Tanner
- When the Rainbow Touches Down, by Tryntje Van Ness Seymour
- Visions and Voices: Native American Painting from the Philbrook Museum of Art, by Lydia Wyckoff
- Wyman, Leland Clifton (1967). The Sacred Mountains of the Navajo: In Four Paintings by Harrison Begay. Museum of Northern Arizona; Harrison Begay (artwork). Flagstaff, AZ: Northern Arizona Society of Science & Art.

== Exhibitions ==
- 2009–2010 – "Through Their Eyes: Paintings from the Santa Fe Indian School," Wheelwright Museum
- 2005 – "Beautiful Resistance: Works on Paper from the Heard Museum Collection", Heard Museum
- 2004 – "Beneath A Turquoise Sky: Navajo Painters and Their World," National Cowboy & Western Heritage Museum,

== Awards ==
- 1954 –Officier d'Academie, Ordre des Palmes Académiques, presented by the French government.
- 1967, 1969, and 1971 – three grand awards at the Gallup Intertribal Ceremonial, Gallup, New Mexico
- 1969 – first prize at the Gallup Intertribal Ceremonial, Gallup, New Mexico
- 1970 – Begay received another honorable mention at the Philbrook Museum annual show.
- 1995 – Native American Masters Award by the Heard Museum.
- 2003 – Lifetime Achievement Award from the Southwestern Association for Indian Arts (SAIA)

== See also ==
- Quincy Tahom, Begay's friend and fellow artist
- Santa Fe Indian School
