= Clara Lee Tanner =

American anthropologist (1905–1997)

- Born: May 28, 1905
- Died: December 22, 1997 (aged 92)
- Education: University of Arizona
- Occupation: Anthropologist
- Spouse: John Frederick Tanner

Clara Lee Tanner (née Clara Lee Fraps; May 28, 1905 – December 22, 1997) was an American anthropologist, editor and art historian. She is known for studies of the arts and crafts of American Indians of the Southwest.

== Early life and education ==
Born Clara Lee Fraps in Biscoe, North Carolina, the daughter of Joseph Conrad Fraps, a railroad machinist, and his wife, Clara Dargon Lee Fraps. She moved with her family to Tucson, Arizona, at the age of two.

She graduated from the University of Arizona with a double major in English and archaeology, in 1927, the first year that an archaeology major was offered. Her teacher in the latter field was Byron Cummings, who had steadily developed the department of archaeology at the university since his arrival in 1915.

With Cummings's encouragement, she went on to graduate study, and, in 1928, became one of the university's first three recipients of master's degrees in archaeology, along with fellow students Florence May Hawley and Emil Walter Haury. In her master's thesis, initially entitled, "Hopiland" and ultimately submitted under the title "Archaeological Survey of Arizona," Tanner undertook a survey of all known prehistoric habitations in the state.

== Career ==
Fraps (Tanner) received an appointment as a lecturer in the archaeology department at the University of Arizona for the fall semester 1928, and continued to teach there over the course of her career, becoming an assistant professor in 1935, associate professor in 1957, and full professor in 1968; she retired with the title of professor emerita in 1978.

She pursued further graduate work at the National University in Mexico City, in 1929, and the Oriental Institute of the University of Chicago, in 1934.

In 1937, when Cummings retired and his former student, Emil Haury, took over as chair of the department, Haury initiated a change in its name to the Department of Anthropology, to reflect the breadth of scholarly activities it had come to encompass; he also aimed to expand it to include social anthropology, applied anthropology, and ethnology. Haury asked Tanner to develop a course on Southwest ethnology and archaeology. From around this time she began to focus her research on Southwest Indian arts, crafts, and ethnology.

In 1938, she married John Frederick Tanner, the proprietor of an Indian craft store in Tucson. Her involvement in her husband's work was another influence that shifted her research interests in the direction of regional cultural anthropology.

Tanner had regularly taken part in the university's summer excavation programs, and conducted archaeological and ethnological research at San Carlos and at the Tanque Verde ruins, a site of prehistoric dwellings. Later, in the interest of her research she traveled extensively throughout the Southwest; besides conducting archaeological studies she visited Native American craftspeople to observe them at work.

From 1938 to 1949 Tanner served as the editor of Kiva, the journal of the Arizona Archaeological and Historical Society (affiliated with the Arizona State Museum), devoted to Southwestern archaeology, anthropology and history.

Clara and John Tanner had one child, a daughter, Sandra Lee (married: Elers), born in 1940. Out of concern for her family life, Tanner never completed a Ph.D., despite having accumulated additional graduate credits, and that lack may have slowed her promotion to full professor; Emil Haury, the department chair through the mid-1960s, regarded her as influential in the department, for having achieved "recognition through her writing". She was the author of some eight books and more than 100 articles published in scholarly journals, magazines, and newspapers.

Reviewing her book Southwest Indian Craft Arts in 1969, archaeologist Neil Judd noted her expertise in the handicrafts of approximately two dozen ethnic groups of the region, and found that the book, with its meticulously accurate illustrations, successfully conveyed the changes in crafts over two generations.

== Publications ==
Monographs

- Tanner, Clara Lee (1957). Southwest Indian Painting. Tucson, Arizona: University of Arizona Press.
- Southwest Indian Painting. Tucson: University of Arizona Press, 1957
- Southwest Indian Craft Arts. Tucson: University of Arizona Press, 1968
- The James T. Bialac Collection of Southwest Indian Paintings. Tucson: Arizona State Museum, 1968
- Southwest Indian Painting: A Changing Art. Tucson: University of Arizona Press, 1973
- Prehistoric Southwestern Craft Arts. Tucson: University of Arizona Press, 1976
- Apache Indian Baskets. Tucson: University of Arizona Press, 1982
- Indian Baskets of the Southwest. Tucson: University of Arizona Press, 1983

Co-Authored works

- Tanner, Clara Lee; Wheat, Joe Ben (1975). Ray Manley's Portraits and Turquoise of Southwest Indians. Ray Manley (photographs). Tucson, AZ: Ray Manley Photography.
- Tanner, Clara Lee, and John F. Tanner, "Contemporary Hopi crafts: Basketry, textiles, pottery, kachinas." In: Dorothy K. Washburn (Ed.), Hopi Kachina: Spirit of Life. San Francisco: California Academy of Sciences, 1980. ISBN 9780295957517. pp. 65–85

Selected articles

- [as Clara Lee Fraps] "Tanque Verde ruins." Kiva 1(4): pp. 1–4. 1935
- "Life forms in prehistoric pottery of the Southwest." Kiva 8(4): pp. 26–32. 1942
- "Byron Cummings, 1860–1954." Kiva 20(1): pp. 1–20. 1954
