= Dorothy Dunn =

American art instructor at the Santa Fe Indian School

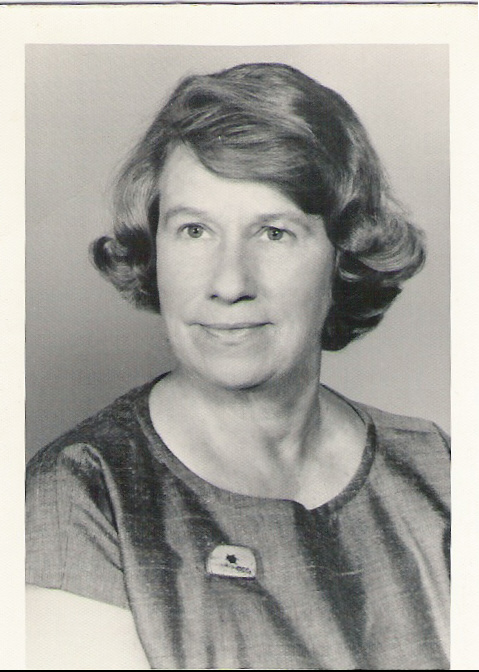
Dorothy Dunn Kramer in 1968

Dorothy Dunn Kramer (December 2, 1903 – July 5, 1992) was an American art instructor who created The Studio School at the Santa Fe Indian School.

== Background ==
Dunn was born on 2 December 1903 in Pottawatomie County, Kansas and educated in Chicago. She first encountered Native American art at the Field Museum in Chicago in 1925. In 1928, Dunn traveled to New Mexico for the first time, where she taught second grade at the Santo Domingo Pueblo Day School, located south of Santa Fe. She learned quickly from her young Pueblo students that many features of their culture were taboo to draw or paint. In 1930, she moved to Shiprock, New Mexico to teach at the San Juan Boarding School at the Northern Navajo Agency. She finally returned to Chicago in 1931 to complete her degree at the School of the Art Institute of Chicago.

== The Studio School ==
While completing her degree, Dunn outlined plans to teach art in the Civil Service at the Santa Fe Indian School and submitted her proposal to the superintendent Chester Faris. She was given a position teaching fifth grade with a half-day to teach art to older students. The Studio School thus opened on 9 September 1932. Established Native artists Julian Martinez and Alfonso Roybal painted murals at the school to welcome the young artists.

Among her students were Allan Houser, Ben Quintana, Harrison Begay, Joe Hilario Herrera, Quincy Tahoma, Andrew Tsinajinnie, Pablita Velarde, Eva Mirabal, Pop Chalee, Oscar Howe, Geronima Cruz Montoya, Sybil Yazzie, and Narcisco Abeyta.

Engaged to fellow teacher Max Kramer and overwhelmed by conflicts with the school administration, Dunn resigned in the spring of 1937. Geronima Cruz Montoya (Ohkay Owingeh) replaced her as director and served until the Studio closed in 1962, when the Institute of American Indian Arts was established.

=== Style ===
Dunn believed that her students had an innate artistic ability, a belief widely promoted by Native American art teacher Angel De Cora (Ho-Chunk) at the beginning of the 20th century. Dunn only taught the most basic fundamentals of painting while deliberately refraining from teaching life drawing, perspective, or color theory. Her early students came primarily from the Rio Grande and Western Pueblos, and the Plains tribes. Each year, the classes grew and represented a greater number of tribes. By 1937, her final year at the Studio, enrollment in the program was 170.

The style she taught featured heavily outlined flat fields of color, illustrative and narrative portrayals of ceremonies, dance, and mythology, painted primarily in opaque watercolors. Dunn taught a single style of painting influenced by the work of the San Ildefonso painters of the 1910s and 1920s – "a style that she believed, rightly or wrongly, was the only authentic painting style for Native American artists to follow." The style she advocated, called the "Studio Style" or "flat-style painting", was inspired by Pueblo mural and pottery painting, Plains hide painting, and rock art.

Dunn's strict adherence to a single style of painting has been widely criticized, especially from within the Native American community. Celebrated Chiricahua Apache sculptor, Allan Houser said, "she trained us all the same way... Her style lacked originality and creativity." However, many of her students appreciated her efforts. Geronima Montoya said that Dunn "did a lot for us. She made us realize how important our own Indian ways were, because we had been made to feel ashamed of them. She gave us something we could be proud of."

== Later career ==
Dunn applied and was rejected for employment by the Indian Arts and Crafts Board. She lectured about Native American art and curated and judged art shows in the United States, Belgium, Italy, and Finland. She published 18 scholarly articles in the 1950s. The government of France named her an Officier d'Académie in 1954, and the School of American Research named her an Honorary Associate. The Indian Arts and Crafts Board awarded her a certification of appreciation in 1962.

In 1968, she published the book, American Indian Painting of the Southwest and Plains Areas.

== Death and legacy ==
She died on 5 July 1992 in Mountain View, California from Alzheimer's disease. She was buried in San Gorgonio Memorial Park in Banning, California.

Her collection of paintings was donated to the Museum of New Mexico in the 1970s. In 1992, Dunn's daughter, Etel Kramer, donated her scholarly and personal papers to that museum.

== Bibliography ==
- Berlo, Janet C. and Ruth B. Phillips. Native North American Art. Oxford History of Art. Oxford: Oxford University Press, 1998. ISBN 978-0-19-284218-3.
- Bernstein, Bruce, and W. Jackson Rushing. Modern by Tradition: American Indian Painting in the Studio Style. Santa Fe: Museum of New Mexico Press, 1995. ISBN 0-89013-291-7.
- Dunn, Dorothy. American Indian Painting of the Southwest and Plains Areas. Albuquerque: University of New Mexico Press, 1968. ASIN B000X7A1T0.
- Melzer, Richard. Buried Treasures: Famous and Unusual Gravesites in New Mexico History. Santa Fe: Sunstone Press, 2007. ISBN 978-0-86534-531-7.
- Penney, David W. North American Indian Art. London: Thames & Hudson, 2004. ISBN 0-500-20377-6.
