= Atencio =

Atencio is a surname. Notable people with the surname include:

- Caridad Atencio (born 1963), Cuban poet and essayist
- Gilbert Benjamin Atencio (1930–1995), Pueblo painter, potter, illustrator, and politician
- Josh Atencio (born 2002), American soccer player
- Lorencita Atencio (1918–1995), Pueblo-American painter and textile artist
- Lourdes Huanca Atencio (born 1968), indigenous and peasant Peruvian activist
- Mariana Atencio (1984), American journalist, television host, author, and speaker
- Pat Atencio (1932–2009), San Ildefonso Pueblo painter
- Peter Atencio (born 1983), American television and film director
- Rodrigo Atencio (born 2002), Argentine soccer player
- Ruperto Atencio Delgado, Costa Rican lawyer, health professional, and politician
- Stephan Atencio (born 1996), Costa Rican professional BMX cyclist
- Tony Atencio (1928–1995), Pueblo painter
- Xavier Atencio (1919–2017), American animator and Imagineer
