= HalloWishes =

Defunct fireworks show at Magic Kingdom

Magic Kingdom
- Area: Cinderella Castle; Main Street U.S.A.
- Status: Removed
- Opening date: 2005
- Closing date: 2018
- Replaced: Halloween Fantasy in the Sky
- Replaced by: Disney's Not So Spooky Spectacular!

Ride statistics
- Attraction type: Fireworks spectacular
- Designer: Walt Disney Creative Entertainment
- Theme: Halloween
- Duration: 11 minutes
- Host: The Ghost Host (Kevin Michael Richardson)
- Wheelchair accessible

HalloWishes (also known by its full title, Happy HalloWishes: A Grim Grinning Ghosts Spooktacular in the Sky) was a fireworks show that took place during "Mickey's Not-So-Scary Halloween Party" at Walt Disney World's Magic Kingdom theme park from 2005 to 2018. It was loosely based on the popular Haunted Mansion attraction and includes vocal appearances by Disney Villains. It was replaced by Disney's Not So Spooky Spectacular!.

== History ==
During the first few years of the Halloween Party, the evening's fireworks show was the original Fantasy in the Sky show, with the addition of a Halloween-themed finale. HalloWishes was created by Disney's Creative Entertainment division specifically for the event, first premiering in 2005 and before the show starts there was a fireworks show named villainy in the sky with new effects and projection. Its development was supervised by Steven Davison and designer Eric Tucker, who also designed Wishes, Holiday Wishes, Remember... and IllumiNations: Reflections of Earth. The music has a predominantly electronic/rock/pop instrumentation with much symphonic arrangements, and was arranged by Mark Hammond and David Hamilton. The vocals were arranged by Tim Davis, who would then go on to work with Adam Anders and Jimmy Levine in the arrangements of the songs and underscore for Glee.

HalloWishes' final year was in 2018. A new show, named Disney's Not-So-Spooky Spectacular, replaced it in 2019. The show is still partially lived by Disneyland's Halloween Screams, which uses portions of this show's audio.

== Plot summary ==
The premise of HalloWishes is that the residents of the Haunted Mansion, led by the mansion's "Ghost Host", are preparing for a celebration of Halloween. The 999 happy haunts, called by Madame Leota, are the first to arrive as the opening lines of "Grim Grinning Ghosts" are played, followed by a pop band version. After the Ghost Host welcomes guests, the mood is set with "This is Halloween" from The Nightmare Before Christmas.

Then the guests are serenaded with the spirits' special brand of karaoke (which the script calls "scary-oke music; just a few tombs [tunes] we've 'dug up' for the occasion") in a medley of Disney's spookiest music. Later, some of Disney's most infamous villains join in, starting with Ursula from The Little Mermaid "plopping in" on the party and adding her own musical mix to the festivities. Jafar from Aladdin and Oogie Boogie from The Nightmare Before Christmas soon follow, and (until 2008) arriving last but far from the least is Maleficent from Sleeping Beauty, showing us how Halloween should really be celebrated. The party ends with the "scream-along" grand finale.

== Soundtrack ==
The musical soundtrack of the show is Halloween-themed, and is in many cases the music of villains from various Disney films:

- "Grim Grinning Ghosts" (from Haunted Mansion) (Buddy Baker / X Atencio)
- "This is Halloween" (from The Nightmare Before Christmas) (Danny Elfman)
- "A Little Night Music Scary-oke" Medley:
  - "Poor Unfortunate Souls" (from The Little Mermaid) (Alan Menken / Howard Ashman)
  - "Cruella DeVil" (from One Hundred and One Dalmatians and its 1996 live-action remake) (Mel Leven)
  - "Never Smile at a Crocodile" (from Peter Pan) (Frank Churchill / Jack Lawrence)^{†}
  - "The Elegant Captain Hook" (from Peter Pan) (Sammy Fain)^{†}
  - "The Skeleton Dance" (from the Silly Symphonies short, The Skeleton Dance) (Edvard Grieg, adapted by Carl Stalling)^{†}
  - "Trust in Me" (from The Jungle Book) (The Sherman Brothers) mixed in with "AEIOU" (from Alice in Wonderland) (Oliver Wallace / Ted Sears)
  - "Heffalumps and Woozles" (from Winnie the Pooh and the Blustery Day) (The Sherman Brothers)
  - "Pink Elephants On Parade" (from Dumbo) (Wallace / Ned Washington)
  - "Who's Afraid of the Big, Bad Wolf?" (from The Three Little Pigs) (Churchill)
- Ursula's Spellbound Medley:
  - Reprise of "Poor Unfortunate Souls"
  - "Be Prepared" (from The Lion King) (Elton John / Tim Rice)
  - "Court of Miracles" (from The Hunchback of Notre Dame) (Menken)^{×}
- Jafar and Oogie Boogie's Medley:
  - "Arabian Nights" (from Aladdin) (Menken)^{×}
  - "Oogie Boogie's Song" (from The Nightmare Before Christmas) (Elfman)
- Maleficent's Visit:^{†}
  - "Night on Bald Mountain" (from Fantasia; voice-over by Maleficent) (Modest Mussorgsky)^{×}
  - "Hellfire" (from The Hunchback of Notre Dame) (Menken)^{×}
- Reprise of "This is Halloween" and "Grim Grinning Ghosts" in a "Scream-Along" medley finale
- "I Put a Spell on You" (from Hocus Pocus) (Screamin' Jay Hawkins; plays as the exit music for the show)

^{×} — Instrumental version is played.
^{†} – Was cut in 2008, moved to Disneyland's Halloween Screams in 2009.

Parts of the soundtrack, which are available on an in-park CD entitled "Magic Kingdom Event Party Music", have also been used in Halloween events at Disneyland Paris and Hong Kong Disneyland.

== Related shows ==
=== Disneyland ===
On September 25, 2009, Disneyland kicked off their yearly 'Halloween Time' promotion. The park introduced a new nighttime fireworks show called Halloween Screams. It is very similar to Hallowishes in that they use the same soundtrack, but there are noticeable differences, the most notable being Jack Skellington (voiced by Chris Sarandon) replacing the Ghost Host as the 'master of scare-monies' and the inclusion of Zero, his ghostly dog.

=== Hong Kong Disneyland ===
On September 16, 2010, Hong Kong Disneyland kicked off their yearly 'Haunted Halloween' promotion. The park introduced a new nighttime fireworks show called Disney's Nightmare in the Sky. It is very similar to HalloWishes and Halloween Screams in that they use the same soundtrack, but there are noticeable differences, the most notable being Maleficent from Walt Disney's Sleeping Beauty replacing the Ghost Host and Jack Skellington as the 'master of scare-monies'.

== Voices ==
- Madame Leota – Eleanor Audley
- Ghost Host – Kevin Michael Richardson
- Ursula the Sea Witch – Pat Carroll
- Jafar – Jonathan Freeman
- Oogie Boogie – Ken Page
- Maleficent – Susanne Blakeslee
- Ghost Hostess – Leota Toombs
- Singer – Tim Davis
- Singer – Missi Hale
