= Disney's Nightmare in the Sky =

Defunct fireworks show

Hong Kong Disneyland
- Area: Sleeping Beauty Castle; Main Street U.S.A.
- Status: Removed
- Opening date: 16 September 2010
- Closing date: 31 October 2010

Ride statistics
- Attraction type: Fireworks spectacular
- Designer: Walt Disney Creative Entertainment
- Host: Maleficent
- Wheelchair accessible

Disney's Nightmare in the Sky (Traditional Chinese:「魔咒焚城」煙花表演) was a fireworks show that took place during 2010 Disney's Haunted Halloween at Hong Kong Disneyland.

== History ==
Prior to 2010 Disney's Haunted Halloween, the evening's fireworks show was the original Disney in the Stars show, with the addition of a Halloween-themed finale. Nightmare in the Sky was created by Disney's Creative Entertainment division specifically for the event, first premiering in 2010. The show was mixed with Walt Disney World Resort's HalloWishes and Disneyland Resort's Halloween Screams. It is hosted by Maleficent from Walt Disney's Sleeping Beauty.

== Show soundtrack ==
- "Grim Grinning Ghosts" (from The Haunted Mansion) (Buddy Baker/Xavier Atencio)
- Maleficent's Visit:
  - "This is Halloween" (from The Nightmare Before Christmas) (Danny Elfman)
- "A Little Night Music Scary-oke" Medley
  - "The Elegant Captain Hook" (from Peter Pan) (Sammy Cahn)
  - "The Skeleton Dance" (from the Silly Symphonies short, The Skeleton Dance) (Edvard Grieg, adapted by Carl Stalling)
  - "Poor Unfortunate Souls" (from The Little Mermaid) (Howard Ashman/Alan Menken)
  - "Court of Miracles" (from The Hunchback of Notre Dame) (Menken)
- Maleficent's Power-Up:
  - "Arabian Nights" (from Aladdin) (Menken)
  - "Night on Bald Mountain" (from Fantasia) (Modest Mussorgsky)
  - "Hellfire" (from The Hunchback of Notre Dame) (Menken)
- "Halloween Scream-Along" and "Grim Grinning Ghosts (reprise)" in a "Scream-Along" medley finale
