= Gilbert Benjamin Atencio =

Pueblo-American painter and potter

- Wah Peen
- Born: 1930; Greeley, Colorado, U.S.
- Died: 1995 (aged 64–65); Albuquerque, New Mexico, U.S.
- Citizenship: American, San Ildefonso Pueblo
- Education: San Ildefonso Day School, Santa Fe Indian School
- Occupations: painter, potter, medical illustrator, politician
- Mother: Isabel Montoya
- Relatives: Tony Atencio (brother), Pat Atencio (brother)

"San Ildefonso Buffalo Dance," 1967, tempera color painting.

Gilbert Benjamin Atencio, also called Wah Peen (Tewa: Wąą Pʼin, transl. "Mountain of the Sacred Wind"; 1930–1995), was a San Ildefonso Pueblo painter, potter, medical Illustrator, and politician.

== Early life and education ==
Atencio was born in 1930 in Greeley, Colorado. He was the daughter of Benjamin Atencio and painter Isabel Montoya, who was a cousin of Maria Martinez. His brothers Pat Atencio and Tony Atencio were also artists, as were his sisters Helen Gutierrez and Angelita Sanchez.

He studied at the San Ildefonso Day School and then at the Santa Fe Indian School, graduating in 1947.

== Career ==
Known for his portraiture and portrayals of local ceremonies and customs, he has exhibited his work across the country. He was trained in the Studio style, and was initially interested in portraiture. An early success was his painting of his relatives Maria and Julian Martinez. His later work often broke from the Studio style and showed influence of self-taught painters like Fred Kabotie. His drawings often feature a number of figures, with apparel and features meticulously rendered. By the 1980s, Atencio also painted abstract or semi-abstract works.

Atencio served as Governor of the San Ildefonso Pueblo in 1966 to 1967. He worked for some years as a medical illustrator.

== Death and legacy ==
Atencio died on April 6, 1995, in Albuquerque, New Mexico. Some of his works have been in the permanent collection of institutions including the Museum of New Mexico, the National Museum of the American Indian, the Gilcrease Museum, and the Philbrook Museum of Art.

Atencio's paintings were included the book, Southwest Indian Painting: A Changing Art (1957, University of Arizona Press) by Clara Lee Tanner.
