= Isabel Montoya =

San Ildefonso Pueblo artist

- Born: Isabel M. Montoya; 1899
- Died: 1996 (aged 96–97)
- Other names: Isabel M. Montoya Atencio, Isabel Montoya Atencio, Esabel Montoya
- Citizenship: American, San Ildefonso Pueblo
- Education: Santa Fe Indian School
- Occupations: painter, potter
- Spouse: Benjamin Atencio
- Children: 5, including Tony Atencio, Gilbert Benjamin Atencio, Pat Atencio
- Relatives: Maria Martinez (cousin)

Isabel M. Montoya Atencio (1899–1996) was a San Ildefonso Pueblo painter and potter.

== Biography ==
Isabel M. Montoya was in 1899 and was the daughter of Nicolassa Peña Montoya and Juan Cruz Montoya. Her cousin was potter Maria Martinez. Her siblings included Rayita Montoya, Santana Montoya, and Alfredo Montoya (the first husband of Tonita Roybal).

Montoya married Benjamin Atencio circa 1925 and had five children, all of whom were painters or potters: Tony, Gilbert Benjamin, Pat, Helen Gutierrez and Angelita Sanchez.

She studied at the Santa Fe Indian School, and is known for her pencil and crayon sketches, and her role in the development of pottery in San Ildefonso.

== See also ==
- List of Native American artists
