= Popovi Da =

Tewa artist and politician, 1923–1971

- Born: Antonio Martinez; May 10, 1923; San Ildefonso Pueblo
- Died: October 17, 1971 (aged 48); Santa Fe, New Mexico
- Style: black-on-black ware and polychrome pottery, painting
- Spouse: Anita Da
- Children: Tony Da (1940–2008)
- Parents: Julían Martínez (father); Maria Martínez (mother)
- Elected: Governor of San Ildefonso Pueblo

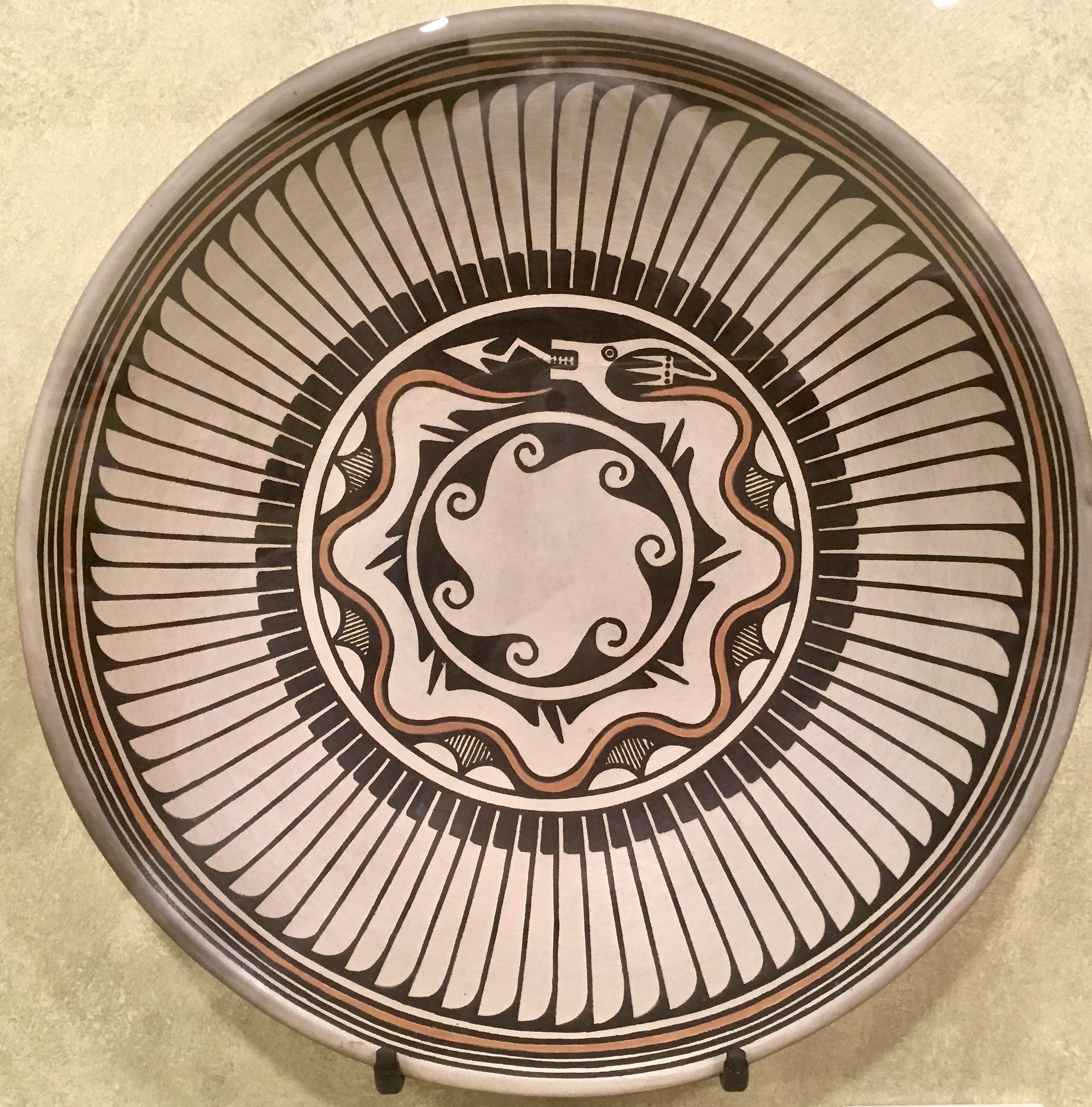
Polychrome Avanyu plate, signed Maria/Popovi (pot: Maria Martínez, painting: Popovi Da), 1969

Popovi Da (née Antonio Martinez; 1923–1971) was a San Ildefonso Pueblo Native American potter. He was also known as Tony Martinez. As an artist he worked as a collaborative team with his mother, the noted Tewa potter, Maria Martínez, and also independently on his own works. He served six terms as Governor of San Ildefonso Pueblo beginning in 1952.

== Life ==
Popovi Da was born Antonio Martinez at San Ildefonso Pueblo in Northern New Mexico to noted potters Maria Martínez and Julían Martínez. He served in the Army during the Second World War as part of the Special Engineer Detachment. He later went on to become a machinist for the Manhattan Project in Los Alamos National Laboratories in 1944–45. After WWII ended, he legally changed his name to his pueblo name, Popovi Da, which means "Red Fox" in the Tewa language. He and his wife, Anita Da had four children, Tony Da, Bernard Kahrahrah, and two daughters Joyce Da and Janice Da.

== Career ==
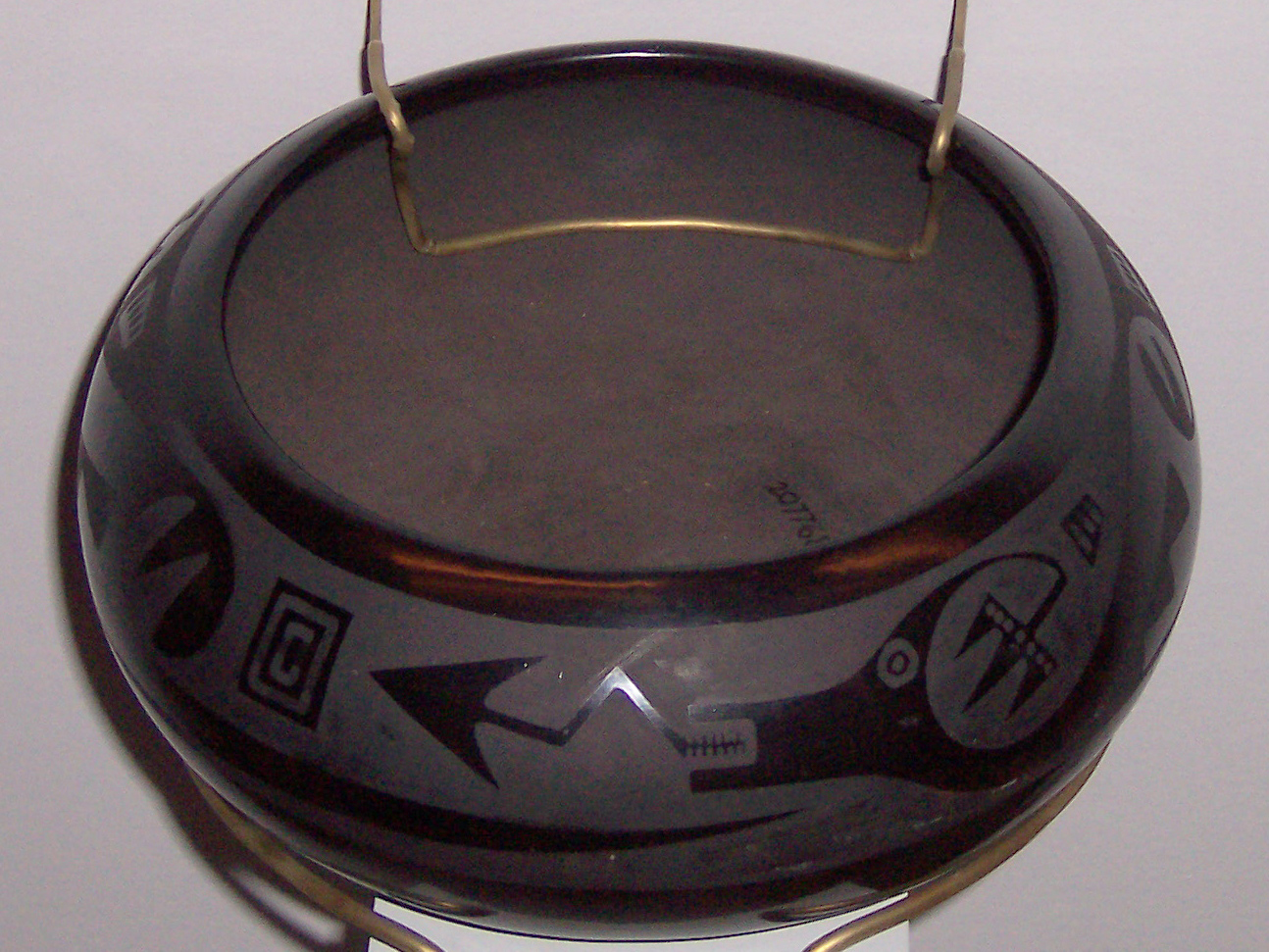
Black-on-black ware bowl with Avanyu design by Maria Martínez and Popovi Da, 1958

During the 1940s he began working with his mother Maria Martinez. He gathered clay and made paints that were used for her pottery. He and his wife, Anita Da (née Cata) of Santa Clara Pueblo founded the Popovi Da Studio of Indian Art at the pueblo. He attended the Santa Fe Indian School, graduating in 1939, and later began collaborating with his mother. He specialized in painting the decorative motifs on her pottery. They worked together as collaborators for 20 years. Together they revived the traditional San Ildefonso pottery style.

As an artist, Popovi Da has been described as an "extraordinary experimentalist" who "stood in a moment between a revival of the past and the innovations of the future." He became known for the perfect gunmetal-like burnished surfaces on his pots. He worked at a time when it was not entirely culturally acceptable for men to make pottery, as their role at the time was to assist the women matriarchal potters. After his father died, he began assisting his mother with her pottery in 1956, before developing his own pottery innovations in 1962. Beginning in 1956, the pots he made with his mother were signed Maria/Popovi.

He began inlaying turquoise into his pots in the 1960s, and also produced a series of works using scraffito and shallow carving to incise designs on the surfaces. He developed a technique of creating black and sienna ombre-like color fades by selectively shielding parts of his pots during the oxidation firing process. In the 1970s he began collaborating with his son, Tony Da (1940–2008), who also became a notable potter.

In 1952 Da was elected Governor of San Ildefonso Pueblo and served six terms. He also served as the Chairman of the All Pueblo Council of Governors (formerly the All-Indian Pueblo Council).

An archive of his papers, reviews, exhibition catalogs and other ephemera is held in the collection of Smithsonian Institution.

== Collections ==
Popovi Da's work is held in the collection of the Museum of Modern Art, the Museum of the Art Institute of Chicago, the Seattle Art Museum, the National Museum of the American Indian, the McNay Art Museum, among others.

== See also ==
- Pueblo pottery
- Black-on-black ware
