= Disney in the Stars =

Defunct fireworks show at Hong Kong Disneyland

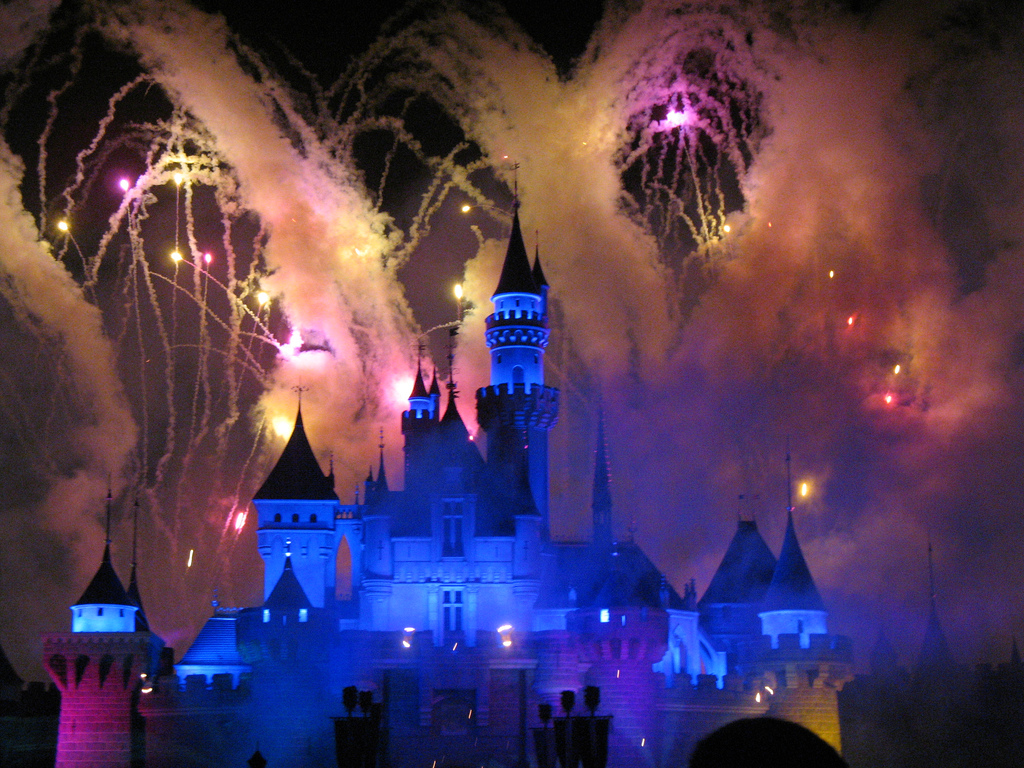

Hong Kong Disneyland
- Area: Sleeping Beauty Castle; Main Street U.S.A.
- Status: Closed
- Opening date: 12 September 2005
- Closing date: 1 January 2018
- Replaced by: Momentous (2022); World of Frozen (Fireworks Launch Area)

Ride statistics
- Attraction type: Fireworks spectacular
- Designer: Walt Disney Creative Entertainment
- Wheelchair accessible

Disney in the Stars (Traditional Chinese: 「星夢奇緣」煙花表演) was the nightly fireworks show at the Hong Kong Disneyland theme park in Lantau, Hong Kong. According to the resort, the fireworks extravaganza above Sleeping Beauty's Castle was one of the most popular attractions at Hong Kong Disneyland.

Based on a similar format used in the Fantasy in the Sky fireworks at other Disney theme parks, fireworks and pyrotechnics were co-ordinated to orchestrated Disney music such as "A Whole New World". The show opened on 12 September 2005, debuting at the park's nighttime inaugural ceremonies. From 16 September to 31 October 2010, Disney in the Stars was replaced by Disney's Nightmare in the Sky, a Halloween-themed fireworks performance.

In celebration of Hong Kong Disneyland's 10th anniversary, the show featured projection mapping onto Sleeping Beauty Castle on 7 September 2015 as the preview. The projections in each area were different in order to evenly distribute crowds and to encourage people to view the show multiple times from different locations. The show then presented all-new scenes from Disney films, including; Frozen, Snow White and the Seven Dwarfs, Pinocchio, Peter Pan, The Little Mermaid, Aladdin, The Princess and the Frog, Tangled, Big Hero 6, Finding Nemo, Cars, Brave and Inside Out.

During the Magical Castle Transformation, the last show appearance was on 1 January 2018 as a "Magical Finale".

== Show soundtrack ==
- "A Dream Is a Wish Your Heart Makes" (from Cinderella)
  - "Sorcerer's Apprentice" (from Fantasia)
    - "Supercalifragilisticexpialidocious" (Mary Poppins)
    - "Zip-A-Dee-Doo-Dah" (Song of the South)
    - "Heigh-Ho" (Snow White and the Seven Dwarfs)
    - "Chim Chim Cher-ee" (Mary Poppins)
    - "Part of Your World" (The Little Mermaid)
- "When You Wish Upon a Star" (from Pinocchio)
  - "Large Bubble Montage" (from Fantasmic!, excluded since 7 September 2015)
    - The Lion King
    - The Jungle Book
    - Dumbo
    - Snow White and the Seven Dwarfs
- "A Whole New World" (from Aladdin)
- Cinderella
  - "Cinderella"
  - "Bibbidi-Bobbidi-Boo"
  - "So This Is Love"
- Alice in Wonderland
  - ""Alice in Wonderland" (song)"
- Mulan
  - "Honor to Us All"
  - "I'll Make a Man Out of You"
- Beauty and the Beast
  - "Beauty and the Beast Song"
  - "Be Our Guest"
- Reprise of "A Whole New World" (also plays as the exit music for the show)
- Reprise of "Large Bubble Montage" (excluded since 7 September 2015)
  - The Lion King
  - The Jungle Book
  - Dumbo
  - Snow White and the Seven Dwarfs
  - Alice in Wonderland
  - Hercules
  - Pinocchio
  - Aladdin
  - Mulan
  - Cinderella
  - Lady and the Tramp
  - Fantasia
  - Bambi
