= Tony Atencio =

Pueblo-American painter

- Su Ta
- Born: Antonio Atencio; January 28, 1928
- Died: October 23, 1995 (aged 67)
- Citizenship: American, San Ildefonso Pueblo
- Education: Santa Fe Indian School
- Occupation: painter
- Mother: Isabel M. Montoya
- Relatives: Gilbert Benjamin Atencio (brother), Pat Atencio (brother)

Tony Atencio, also called Su Ta (English: "Painted Arrow"; January 24, 1928 – October 23, 1995), was a San Ildefonso Pueblo painter. He studied at the Santa Fe Indian School and exhibited his work across the country. He is known for his paintings of animals.

Atencio was the son of Benjamin Atencio and painter Isabel M. Montoya, who was a cousin of Maria Martinez. His brothers Gilbert Benjamin Atencio and Pat Atencio were also artists, as were his sisters Helen Gutierrez and Angelita Sanchez.

Atencio spent fifteen years in the United States Navy. He died on October 23, 1995. Some of his works have been in the permanent collection of institutions including the Museum of New Mexico and the National Museum of the American Indian.
