= Nightmare Revisited =

Compilation album by various artists
- Released: September 30, 2008
- Recorded: 2006–2008
- Genre: Various styles of rock
- Length: 75:49
- Label: Walt Disney
- Producer: David Agnew

The Nightmare Before Christmas chronology
The Nightmare Before Christmas: Original Motion Picture Soundtrack (1993)	Nightmare Revisited (2008)

Professional ratings
Review scores
Source	Rating
AllMusic	3.5/5 stars

Nightmare Revisited is a cover album of songs and score from the 1993 Disney animated film The Nightmare Before Christmas. It was released on September 30, 2008, by Walt Disney Records to commemorate the film's 15th anniversary of its theatrical release. In addition to the album's eighteen covers are two re-recordings by original composer Danny Elfman, of the "Opening" and "Closing" tracks. One song featured on the album, Marilyn Manson's "This Is Halloween", was previously released nearly two years earlier, on the 2006 reissue of the film's original soundtrack which, featuring five covers of songs from the film, acted as a precursor to Nightmare Revisited. Enhanced content on the disc features the trailer of The Nightmare Before Christmas.

American psychobilly band Tiger Army also provided a cover of "Oogie Boogie's Song", which was not featured on physical CD editions of Nightmare Revisited, but was released as a digital bonus track. Scott Murphy's cover of "Sally's Song" is also featured on Japanese pressings of the album.

== Promotion ==
On September 27, 2008, three days before the release of Nightmare Revisited, the album was made available for streaming exclusively by Spin.com.

On September 22, 2008, Evanescence vocalist Amy Lee, who contributed a cover of "Sally's Song" for the album, announced that she would be performing her cover on The Tonight Show with Jay Leno on October 13, 2008. Marilyn Manson similarly performed his cover of "This Is Halloween" (from the reissue of The Nightmare Before Christmas: Original Motion Picture Soundtrack) on The Tonight Show on Halloween two years earlier (October 31, 2006).

== Track listing ==
All tracks are written by Danny Elfman.

No.	Title	Artist	Length
1.	"Overture"	DeVotchKa	2:36
2.	"Opening"	Danny Elfman	1:00
3.	"This Is Halloween"	Marilyn Manson	3:22
4.	"Jack's Lament"	The All-American Rejects	3:15
5.	"Doctor Finkelstein/In the Forest"	Amiina	3:17
6.	"What's This?"	Flyleaf	3:20
7.	"Town Meeting Song"	The Polyphonic Spree	8:55
8.	"Jack and Sally Montage"	Vitamin String Quartet	5:44
9.	"Jack's Obsession"	Sparklehorse	5:32
10.	"Kidnap the Sandy Claws"	Korn	3:37
11.	"Making Christmas"	Rise Against	3:27
12.	"Nabbed"	Yoshida Brothers	7:34
13.	"Oogie Boogie's Song"	Rodrigo y Gabriela	2:48
14.	"Sally's Song"	Amy Lee	3:02
15.	"Christmas Eve Montage"	RJD2	3:46
16.	"Poor Jack"	Plain White T's	2:34
17.	"To the Rescue"	Datarock	3:34
18.	"Finale/Reprise"	Shiny Toy Guns	3:06
19.	"Closing"	Danny Elfman	1:24
20.	"End Title"	The Album Leaf	3:46
Total length:			75:39

iTunes and Amazon MP3 edition
No.	Title	Artist	Length
21.	"Oogie Boogie's Song"	Tiger Army	3:02
Total length:			78:41

Japanese edition
No.	Title	Artist	Length
21.	"Sally's Song"	Scott Murphy	2:11
Total length:			77:50

== Personnel ==
1. "Overture"

Produced by DeVotchKa
Mixed by Greg Macrae

2. "Opening"

Produced by Danny Elfman
Narration recorded and mixed by Noah Snyder

3. "This Is Halloween"

Produced and mixed by Marilyn Manson and Tim Skold

4. "Jack's Lament"

Vocals: Tyson Ritter
Everything else: Nick Wheeler
Produced by The All-American Rejects
Recorded by Nick Wheeler
Mixed by Brian Malouf at Cookie Jar Recordings, Studio City, California

5. "Doctor Finkelstein/In the Forest"

Produced, arranged, and recorded by Amiina
Mixed and mastered by Amiina and Birgir Jón Birgisson in Reykjavik, Iceland

6. "What's This?"

Lead vocals: Lacey Mosley
Drums: James Culpepper
Guitar: Sameer Bhattacharya
Guitar: Jared Hartmann
Bass guitar: Pat Seals
Produced by Mark Lewis and Flyleaf

7. "Town Meeting Song"

Produced by The Speakers
Mixed and engineered by John Congleton

8. "Jack and Sally Montage"

Violins: Wes Precourt
Viola: Yevgen Stupka
Cello: Waul Pianko
Bass: Vahan Karapetyan
Produced and arranged by Sasha Ivanov
Recorded and mixed by Sasha Ivanov at Xact Sound Productions

9. "Jack's Obsession"

Arranged, mixed and produced by Mark Linkous

10. "Kidnap the Sandy Claws"

Vocals: Jonathan Davis
Guitar: James Shaffer
Bass: Fieldy
Keyboards: Zac Baird
Drums: Ray Luzier
Produced by Korn, Zac Baird and Jim "Bud" Monti
Recorded and Mixed by Jim "Bud" Monti at KoЯn Studios, Hollywood, California

11. "Making Christmas"

Vocals, guitar: Tim McIlrath
Bass, vocals: Joe Principe
Drums, vocals: Brandon Barnes
Guitar, vocals: Zach Blair
Additional backing vocals: Emily Schambra, Jeff Pezzati, Bill Stevenson, Jason Livermore
Produced and engineered by Bill Stevenson and Jason Livermore
Additional engineering by Andrew Berlin and Jason Allen
Mixed by Jason Livermore at the Blasting Room, Ft. Collins, Colorado
Recorded at Gravity Studios, Chicago, Illinois

12. "Nabbed"

Piano and synthesizer programming: Akira Inoue
Produced and arranged by Akira Inoue
Recorded and mixed by Takayoshi "Dr." Yamanouchi at Sound Inn Studios, Tokyo, Japan

13. "Oogie Boogie's Song"

Produced by John Leckie and Rodrigo y Gabriela
Recorded by John Leckie at Sound Factory B, Los Angeles, California
Mastered by Sean McGee at Abbey Road Studios, London, England

14. "Sally's Song"

Vocals, piano, harp: Amy Lee
Drums and programming: Will Hunt
Bass: Todd Cromwell
Additional keyboards: Chad Chapelin
Produced by Will Hunt
Engineered by Chad Chapelin at Spaceway Studios, Dallas, Texas
Mixed by Shane Wilson at Pentavarit Studios, Nashville, Tennessee
Mastered by Ted Jensen at Sterling Sound, New York City

15. "Christmas Eve Montage"

All instruments: R. Krohn
Produced by Rjd2 for R J Electrical Connections

16. "Poor Jack"

Produce by Mike Retando and Tom Higgenson
Engineered by Justin Wilk at Gravemaster Studios, Chicago, Illinois

17. "To the Rescue"

Produced by Datarock
Additional programming and production by Kato Adland and Erlend Fauske

18. "Finale/Reprise"

Produced and programmed by Chad Petree
Recorded and mixed at Dangerous Insects Studios, Shawnee, Oklahoma

19. "Closing"

Produced by Danny Elfman
Narration recorded and mixed by Noah Snyder

20. "End Title"

Arranged and performed by Jimmy LaValle
Violins: Matt Resovich
Recorded by Jimmy LaValle and Pall Jenkins
Produced by Jimmy LaValle

- A&R: Dani Markman and Tom MacDougall
- Executive producer: David Agnew
- Business affairs: Jeff Lowy
- Mastered by Stephen Marcussen at Marcussen Mastering, Hollywood, California
- Creative design: Steve Gerdes
- Album design: Steve Sterling

== Charts ==
Chart (2008)	Peak position
U.S. Billboard 200	31
U.S. Billboard Top Compilation Albums	1

== See also ==
- Almost Alice
- List of Billboard Top Holiday Albums number ones of the 2000s
- Muppets: The Green Album
- Frankenweenie: Unleashed!
