= Pat Atencio =

Pueblo-American painter

- Koo Peen
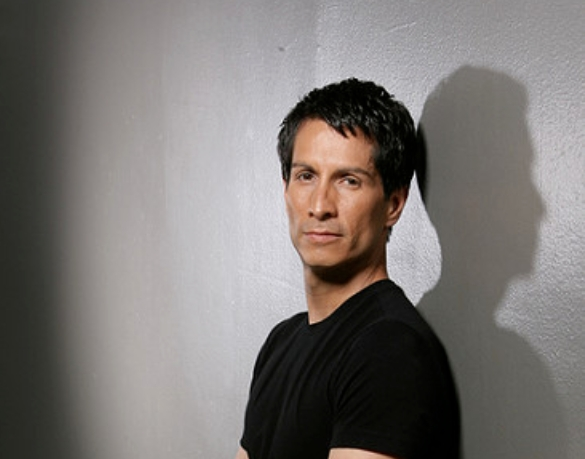
- Born: José Patricio Atencio; January 22, 1932
- Died: January 15, 2009 (aged 76)
- Citizenship: American, San Ildefonso Pueblo
- Education: Santa Fe Indian School
- Occupation: painter
- Mother: Isabel Montoya
- Relatives: Gilbert Atencio (brother), Tony Atencio (brother)

Pat Atencio, also called Koo Peen (Tewa: Kʼuu Pʼin, transl. "Mountain Rock"; January 22, 1932 – January 15, 2009), was a San Ildefonso Pueblo painter.

== Biography ==
Pat Atencio was the son of Benjamin Atencio and painter Isabel M. Montoya. His mother's cousin was Maria Martinez. His brothers Gilbert Benjamin Atencio and Tony Atencio were also artists, as were his sisters Helen Gutierrez and Angelita Sanchez.

He studied at the Santa Fe Indian School and exhibited his work across the country. Some of his works are in the permanent collection of institutions including the Museum of New Mexico and the National Museum of the American Indian.

== See also ==
- List of Native American artists
