= Julian Martinez =

American painter (1879–1943)

Julián Martínez
- Pocano
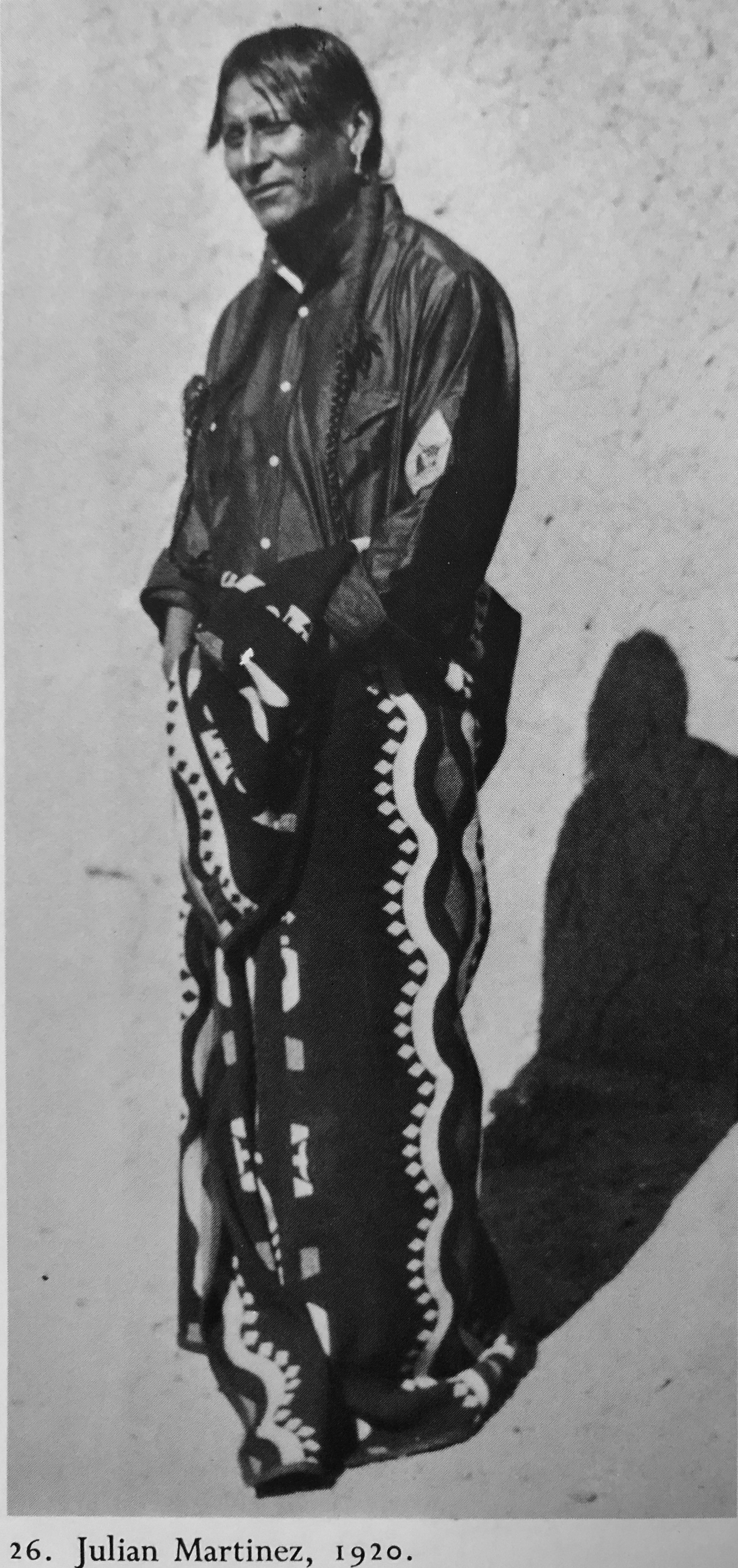
- Julian Martinez in 1920
- Born: Pocano; 1879; San Ildefonso Pueblo, New Mexico
- Died: 1943; San Ildefonso Pueblo, New Mexico
- Education: community
- Known for: Ceramics, Painting
- Movement: San Ildefonso Self-Taught Group
- Spouse: Maria Martinez
- Children: Popovi Da
- Elected: Governor of San Ildefonso Pueblo
- Patrons: School for Advanced Research

Julián Martínez, also known as Pocano (1879–1943), was a San Ildefonso Pueblo potter, painter, and the patriarch of a family of Native American ceramic artists in the United States.

== Background ==
Martínez was born in 1879 in San Ildefonso Pueblo, New Mexico. His name, Pocano, means "Coming of the Spirits" in Tewa. He worked as a farmer, general laborer, and janitor, in addition to being an artist. He was elected governor of San Ildefonso.

Martínez married matriarch potter Maria Martinez, and together they had a son Popovi Da, who was also a potter. Maria is considered the preeminent creator of San Ildefonso blackware pottery; however Julian's exclusive painting of those jars contributed to her accomplishments. Their son Popovi became a stellar innovator in Pueblo ceramic arts and his collaborative work with Maria is at the height of their collected pottery.

Martinez died on March 6, 1943, in San Ildefonso Pueblo.

== Work ==
The Martinez family was instrumental in reviving the San Ildefonso ceramic arts and creating the San Ildefonso black-on-black, matte-on-polished pottery technique. The Martínez family is credited for inventing a technique that would allow for areas of the pottery to have a matte finish, and other areas to be a glossy jet black.

Martínez with help from anthropologist Edgar Lee Hewett researched historical designs and reproduced them on the pottery, later modifying classical Pueblo designs to create his own.

Martínez was also an easel painter. He painted scenes of Pueblo rituals as well as abstract designs with colored pencil and watercolor, and featured Western figurative types against vignetted backgrounds. He painted murals at the former Santa Fe Indian School in Santa Fe, New Mexico and Mesa Verde National Park in Colorado.

Martínez was part of an art movement called the San Ildefonso Self-Taught Group, which included such noted artists as Alfonso Roybal, Tonita Peña, Abel Sanchez (Oqwa Pi), Crecencio Martinez, and Encarnación Peña.

== Public collections ==
The artwork of Maria and Julian Martinez can be found in the following public collections.

- American Museum of Natural History, New York
- Amerind Foundation, Dragoon, Arizona
- Amon Carter Museum of Art, Fort Worth, Texas
- Arizona State Museum, Tucson
- Cincinnati Art Museum, Ohio
- Cleveland Museum of Fine Arts, Ohio
- Columbus Gallery of Fine Arts, Ohio
- Dartmouth College, Hanover, New Hampshire
- Denver Art Museum, Colorado
- Fred Jones Jr. Museum of Art, Norman, Oklahoma
- Gilcrease Museum, Tulsa, Oklahoma
- Joslyn Art Museum, Omaha, Nebraska
- Marion Koogler McNay Art Museum, San Antonio, Texas
- Millicent Rogers Museum, Taos, New Mexico
- Montclair Art Museum, Montclair, New Jersey
- Minneapolis Institute of Arts, Minnesota
- Museum of New Mexico, Santa Fe
- Museum of Northern Arizona, Katherine Harvey Collection, Flagstaff
- National Museum of the American Indian, George Gustav Heye Center, New York
- National Museum of the American Indian, Washington, D.C.
- Newark Museum, Newark, NJ
- Owensboro Museum of Fine Arts, Owensboro, Kentucky
- Philbrook Museum of Art, Tulsa, Oklahoma
- Riverside Museum, New York
- School for Advanced Research, Santa Fe, New Mexico
- Smithsonian Museum of American Art, Washington, D.C.
- Southwest Museum of the American Indian, Los Angeles
- University of Pennsylvania Museum, Philadelphia
- Wheelwright Museum of the American Indian, Santa Fe, New Mexico

== See also ==
- List of Native American artists
- Native American pottery
- Black-on-black ware

== Notes ==
- Lester, Patrick D. The Biographical Directory of Native American Painters. Tulsa, OK: SIR Publications, 1995. ISBN 0-8061-9936-9.
- Crawford, Virginia. "American Indian Painting." The Bulletin of the Cleveland Museum of Art 69, no. 1 (1982): 3–17.
