= Stephan Atencio =

Costa Rican BMX rider

Personal information
- Nationality: Costa Rican
- Born: July 19, 1996 (age 28); Pavas, San José
- Occupation: Professional BMX Athlete

Sport
- Country: Costa Rica
- Sport: Freestyle bmx
- Event(s): X Games, Dew Tour

Stephan Atencio (born July 19, 1996) is a Costa Rican professional BMX cyclist.

He is known in Costa Rica for participating in BMX freestyle competitions in the X-Knights, winning the silver medal in the 2018 Urban Cycling World Championship. In 2018, Stephan experienced his first international competition (Simple Session) in Latvia. The year before, he left to build a career in Spain. In Costa Rica, he felt limited by the lack of committed sponsorships and the low visibility of BMX Freestyle.

== Early life ==
His mother bought him a bicycle when he was 11 years old. Stephan will never forget the price (3,500 colones - 7 dollars) and the excitement of releasing it at Christmas. Laughing, Atencio stated that he spent the "good night" spray painting the frame and adjusting some screws for the next day. Later he had to sell the bicycle to eat. Atencio believed that it was the end of his story, but when he least expected it, an ex-girlfriend supported him financially to return to competition.

== Career ==
Atencio became obsessed with Barcelona because of videos uploaded by his idols. This prompted Stephan, nicknamed El TIco, to fly to Spain. He later returned to Costa Rica after a trip to the United States and Mexico where he made multiple sporting appearances and formally joined the Red Bull team. For 2014 he finished ranked 9 in the world.
