= The Nightmare Before Christmas (soundtrack) =

The Nightmare Before Christmas: Original Motion Picture Soundtrack

Soundtrack album by Danny Elfman
- Released: October 12, 1993
- Genres: Halloween music; show tunes
- Length: 61:09
- Label: Walt Disney
- Producer: Danny Elfman

The Nightmare Before Christmas chronology
The Nightmare Before Christmas: Original Motion Picture Soundtrack (1993)	Nightmare Revisited (2008)

Danny Elfman chronology
Batman Returns (1992)	The Nightmare Before Christmas (1993)	Black Beauty (1994)

2006 Re-release cover

Professional ratings
Review scores
Source	Rating
AllMusic	4.5/5 stars

The Nightmare Before Christmas is the fifteenth soundtrack album by American composer Danny Elfman. It was released on October 12, 1993, by Walt Disney Records to promote the 1993 American stop-motion animated musical dark fantasy film The Nightmare Before Christmas. Composed by Danny Elfman, the soundtrack was nominated for the 1993 Golden Globe for Best Original Score. The album peaked at #98 on the US Billboard 200.

For the film's 2006 re-release in Disney Digital 3-D, a special edition of the soundtrack was released, a bonus disc which contained covers of five of the film's songs by Fall Out Boy, Panic! at the Disco, Marilyn Manson, Fiona Apple and She Wants Revenge. Four original demo tracks (six on the Best Buy exclusive) by Elfman were also included. For the film's 15th anniversary in 2008, the cover album Nightmare Revisited was released, which includes two re-recordings by Elfman.

== Background ==
The soundtrack for The Nightmare Before Christmas was composed by composer and then-Oingo Boingo frontman Danny Elfman. Elfman sought to make the soundtrack timeless and drew on classic popular composers for inspiration. He explained: "I wanted it to sound like it was written 50 or 100 years ago, so I turned my own influences for that stuff. Kurt Weill's The Threepenny Opera, which was a major thing in my life, was a source, as well musicals from Cole Porter and Gershwin, and to a certain extent, Rodgers and Hammerstein." For "What's This?" Elfman sought to capture the rapid-pace lyricism of Gilbert and Sullivan.

In a later interview, Elfman likened Jack Skellington's experience as the leader of Halloweentown looking to escape to a different world to his discontentment with being the leader of his band, Oingo Boingo. He recalled, "'I always felt Jack was a part of me. ... When I wrote those songs, I was in kind of a unique position, because like Jack I was the king of my own little kingdom – that was Oingo Boingo. And like Jack, I really wanted a way out, but I didn't know how to get out because so many people depended on me. So my own psychological mindset at the time was that I was writing from my own perspective as much as his, because I understood what it felt like to want something else."

== Track listing ==
All tracks are written by Danny Elfman.

No.	Title	Performer(s)	Length
1.	"Overture (score)"		1:48
2.	"Opening"	Patrick Stewart	0:57
3.	"This Is Halloween"	The Citizens of Halloween Town	3:16
4.	"Jack's Lament"	Danny Elfman	3:14
5.	"Doctor Finkelstein/In the Forest (score)"		2:36
6.	"What's This?"	Danny Elfman	2:59
7.	"Town Meeting Song"	Danny Elfman, Halloween Cast	2:56
8.	"Jack and Sally Montage (score)"		5:17
9.	"Jack's Obsession"	Danny Elfman, Halloween Cast	2:46
10.	"Kidnap the Sandy Claws"	Paul Reubens, Catherine O'Hara, Danny Elfman	3:02
11.	"Making Christmas"	Danny Elfman, The Citizens of Halloween Town	3:57
12.	"Nabbed (score)"		3:04
13.	"Oogie Boogie's Song"	Ken Page, Ed Ivory	3:17
14.	"Sally's Song"	Catherine O'Hara	1:47
15.	"Christmas Eve Montage (score)"		4:44
16.	"Poor Jack"	Danny Elfman	2:31
17.	"To the Rescue (score)"		3:38
18.	"Finale/Reprise"	Danny Elfman, Catherine O'Hara, The Citizens of Halloween Town	2:45
19.	"Closing"	Patrick Stewart	1:26
20.	"End Title (score)"		5:05

On some versions of the CD, "End Credits" is two tracks (20 and 21) with lengths of 1:10 and 3:55 respectively. In this case, track 21 is considered a "hidden track" but features the same music as the 20-track release, which keeps "End Credits" as one track.

=== 2006 reissue bonus disc ===
All tracks are written by Danny Elfman.

No.	Title	Contributing artist	Length
1.	"This Is Halloween"	Marilyn Manson	3:22
2.	"Sally's Song"	Fiona Apple	3:20
3.	"What's This?"	Fall Out Boy	3:00
4.	"Kidnap the Sandy Claws"	She Wants Revenge	5:09
5.	"This Is Halloween"	Panic! at the Disco	3:36
6.	"Making Christmas" (Demo)	Danny Elfman	5:34
7.	"Oogie Boogie's Song" (Demo)	Danny Elfman	3:15
8.	"Kidnap the Sandy Claws" (Demo)	Danny Elfman	2:51
9.	"This Is Halloween" (Demo)	Danny Elfman	3:19

Best Buy exclusive bonus tracks
No.	Title	Contributing artist	Length
10.	"Town Meeting Song" (Demo)	Danny Elfman	2:47
11.	"What's This?" (Demo)	Danny Elfman	3:00

The "Kidnap the Sandy Claws" and "This Is Halloween" demos are reversed in the track listing on the backside of the album cover and in the album booklet.

== Personnel ==
Credits and personnel adapted from the 2006 edition of the soundtrack's liner notes.

=== Performers ===
- Danny Elfman – principal artist (Jack Skellington, Barrell), vocals
- Catherine O'Hara – principal artist (Sally, Shock), vocals
- Glenn Shadix – principal artist (Mayor), vocals
- Ken Page – principal artist (Oogie Boogie), vocals
- Paul Reubens – principal artist (Lock), vocals
- Ed Ivory – principal artist (Santa), vocals

=== Additional performers ===
Sherwood Ball – background vocals
Debi Durst – background vocals
Randy Crenshaw – background vocals
Kerry Katz – background vocals
Susan McBride – background vocals
Bobbi Page – background vocals
Greg Proops - background vocals
Carmen Twillie – background vocals
Glenn Walters – background vocals

=== Musicians ===
- Steve Bartek – musical director, song orchestration
- Mark McKenzie – score orchestration
- Chris Boardman – song conductor
- J.A.C. Redford – score conductor
- Marc Mann – additional orchestration

=== Technical ===
- Danny Elfman – producer
- Bob Badami – associate producer, music editor
- Richard Kraft – associate producer
- Bill Jackson – vocal recording engineer
- Robert Fernandez – song recording engineer
- Shawn Murphy – song and score recording engineer, audio mixing
- Sharone Rice – assistant engineer
- Bill Easystone – assistant engineer
- Mike Piersante – assistant engineer
- Andy Bass – assistant engineer
- Dave Collins – digital editing, mastering engineer
- Letitia Rogers – assistant music editor
- Bobbi Page – vocal contractor
- Patti Zimmitti – orchestra contractor
- Mark Mann – music preparation
- Joel Franklin – music copyist
- Megan Cavallari – demo assistant
- Gary Adler – art director

=== Bonus Content ===
1. "This Is Halloween"

Produced and Mixed by Marilyn Manson and Tim Skold

2. "Sally's Song"

Produced by Mike Elizondo
Mixed by Adam Hawkins
Engineered by Adam Hawkins @ Phantom Studio, Westlake Village, CA
Assistant Engineer: Erin J. Funk-Dublan
Keyboards: Zac Rae
Upright Bass: Mike Elizondo
Drums: Charley Drayton
Strings: The Section Quartet - Eric Gorfain, Daphne Chen, Leah Katz, Richard Dodd
String Arrangement by Eric Gorfain
Project Coordinator: Jolie Levine

3. "What's This?"

Produced and Mixed by Neal Avron
Recorded by Neal Avron and Erich Talaba
Pro Tools Engineer: Matt Green
Assistant Engineer: Zeph Sowers
Recorded at The Pass Studios, Los Angeles, CA
Mixed at Paramount Studios, Hollywood, CA
Mix Assistant: George Gumbs

4. "Kidnap the Sandy Claws"

Produced by Korn

5. "This Is Halloween"

Produced by Panic! at the Disco and Rob Mathes
Vocals Arranged by Ryan Ross and Brendon Urie
Recorded by Panic! at the Disco at Ryan's house Las Vegas, NV
Orchestra Arranged and Conducted by Rob Mathes
Recorded by Mark Mandelhaum, assisted by Alex Venguer at Legacy Recording Studio, New York, NY
Concertmaster and Orchestra Contractor: Sandra Park
Music Copyist: Mike and Lori Casteel
Mixed by Chris Shaw at Avatar Studios, New York, NY

6-11. Demos

All Demo Vocals Performed by Danny Elfman
Synth Demo Tracks Arranged, Orchestrated and Performed by Danny Elfman
Recorded by Bill Jackson
Mixed by Noah Snyder
Produced by Danny Elfman and Tim Burton

- A&R: Dani Markman
- Business affairs: Jeff Lowy
- Mastered by Pat Sullivan at Bernie Grundman Mastering, Hollywood, CA
- Creative Direction: Steve Gerdes
- Album Design: Greg Ross for Orabor

== Foreign-language versions ==
There are several foreign-language versions of the soundtrack, each features tracks sung by vocalists in their native language as well as original score tracks by Danny Elfman.

- French, L'Étrange Noël de Monsieur Jack

Jack - Olivier Constantin
Sally - Nina Morato
Oogie Boogie - Richard Darbois
Santa Claus (Père Noël) - Henri Poirier

- German, Nightmare Before Christmas

Jack - Alexander Goebel
Sally - Nina Hagen
Oogie Boogie - Ron Williams
Santa Claus - Manfred Lichtenfeld

- Italian, Nightmare Before Christmas

Jack - Renato Zero
Sally - Marjorie Biondo
Oogie Boogie (Bau-Bau) - Andrea Surdi
Santa Claus (Babbo Natale) - Silvio Spaccesi

- Japanese, ナイトメアー・ビフォア・クリスマス
  Jack (ジャック) - Masachika Ichimura (市村正親)
  Sally (サリー) - Yuko Doi (土居裕子)
  Oogie Boogie (ブギー) - Kobayashi Atom (小林アトム)
  Santa Claus (サンタクロース) - Tomoaki Nagae (永江智明)
- Castilian Spanish, Pesadilla antes de navidad

Jack - Tony Cruz
Sally - María Caneda
Oogie Boogie - Jesús Castejón
Santa Claus - Julio Núñez

- Latin American Spanish, El extraño mundo de Jack
  Jack - Sergio Zaldivar
  Sally - Gabriela Vega
  Oogie Boogie - Rubén Cerda
  Santa Claus - José Lavat
- Russian, Кошмар перед Рождеством
  Jack (Джек) - Aleksej Kortnyev (Алексей Кортнев)
  Sally (Салли) - Tutta Larsen (Тутта Ларсен)
  Oogie Boogie (Бугимэн) - Nikolai Fomenko (Николай Фоменко)
  Santa Claus (Санта-Клаус) - Sergej Mazayev (Сергей Мазаев)

== Charts ==
Chart performance for The Nightmare Before Christmas
Chart (2019–2026)	Peak position
Belgian Albums (Ultratop Flanders)	60
Belgian Albums (Ultratop Wallonia)	116
Canadian Albums (Billboard)	33
Spanish Albums (Promusicae)	95
Swiss Albums (Schweizer Hitparade)	28
US Billboard 200	36
US Soundtrack Albums (Billboard)	1

== Certifications ==
Certifications for The Nightmare Before Christmas
Region	Certification	Certified units/sales
United Kingdom (BPI)	Silver	60,000^{‡}
United States (RIAA)	Platinum	1,000,000^{‡}
^{‡} Sales+streaming figures based on certification alone.

== See also ==
- List of Billboard Top Holiday Albums number ones of the 2000s
- List of Billboard Top Holiday Albums number ones of the 2010s
