= Caridad Atencio =

Cuban poet and essayist

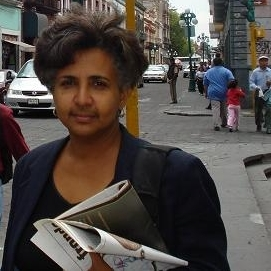
- Caridad Atencio (2008)
- Born: 14 February 1963 (age 63); Havana
- Occupation: Writer

Caridad Atencio (born 14 February 1963) is a Cuban poet and essayist.

== Early life and career ==
Caridad Atencio was born on Valentine's Day 1963.

She graduated from the University of Havana with a degree in philology in 1985. She has worked as an assistant researcher at the Martianos Studies Center since 1991 and is a member of the Scientific Council of that institution.

Considered one of the most important poets of the Cuban generation of the 1980s, critic Enrique Saínz wrote that Atencio "has observed and written with precision about the dialogue between her body and another's, the other in relation to self. In this way, she has achieved an extraordinary literary moment."

== Awards ==
She has won the Pinos Nuevos de Poesía Prize in 1996, Essay Calendar Prize in 1999, Essay Diver Award in 2000, Poetry Giver Prize in 2002, the Poetry Prize of the Cuban magazine La Gaceta de Cuba in 2005, and the Prize of the Criticism of 2010 (granted in 2011 for her book, El libro de los sentidos).
