= Lourdes Huanca Atencio =

Peruvian indigenous activist

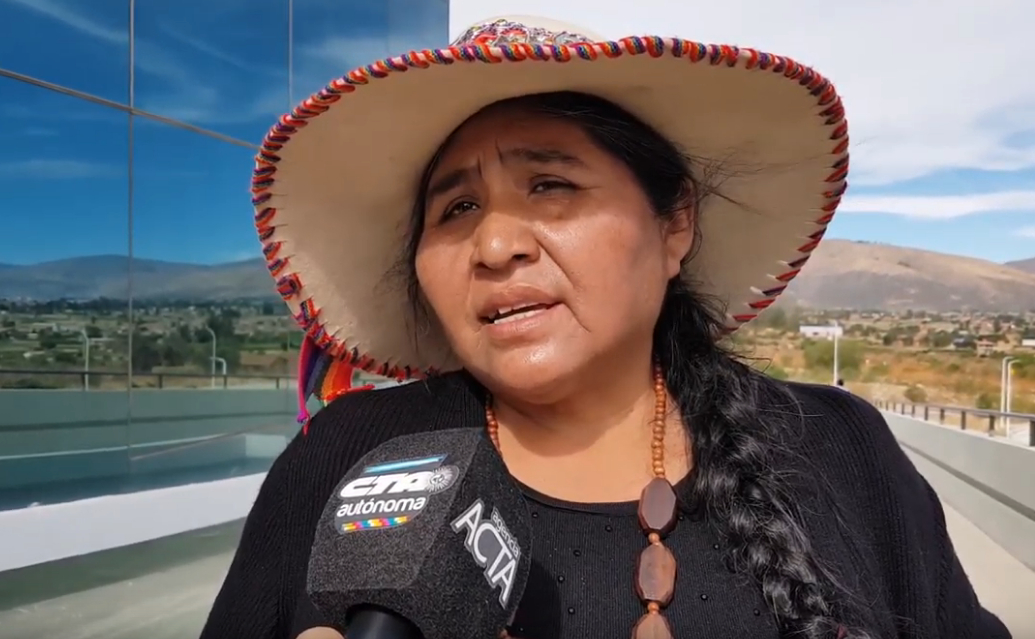
Photograph of Lourdes Huanca Atencio from 2020. In this image, she is pictured in Cochabamba, Bolivia.

Lourdes Esther Huanca Atencio (born 1968) is an indigenous and peasant Peruvian activist and the founder of the National Federation of Female Peasants, Artisans, Indigenous, Native and Salaried Workers of Perú (FENMUCARINAP). In 2020, Huanca Atencio was recognized by Perú's Ministry of Justice and Human Rights alongside four other women human rights activists. In addition to her work with FENMUCARINAP, Huanca Atencio has also held various titles within the Fund for the Development of Indigenous Peoples of Latin America and the Caribbean (FILAC). Following Peru's 2022 failed presidential self-coup attempt, Huanca Atencio has been reportedly living in exile outside of Peru due to her support of Pedro Castillo.

== Early and personal life ==
Lourdes Huanca Atencio was born in Tacna, a city in the South of Peru, in 1968. She is a member of Peru's Aimara tribe, and her family is from Puno, Peru. She lived with her father until she was eight years old at which point she was sent to live with her mother and step-father. After experiencing violence from her step-father, Huanca Atencio left her mother's home to live on the streets of Peru. Currently, Huanca Atencio has two sons.

Although Huanca Atencio never received a formal college education. She has been quoted saying that she received her education from the streets.

== Activism ==
=== FENMUCARINAP ===
Huanca Atencio is the president and founder of the National Federation of Female Peasants, Artisans, Indigenous, Native and Salaried Workers of Peru (FENMUCARINAP), which was founded in 2008. The organization, which is made up of approximately 160,000 women across Peru, aims to empower women in rural Peru, focusing on indigenous rights, bodily autonomy and protection, protection of land, environmental issues, and labor rights issues. In 2017, as acting president of FENMUCARINAP, Huanca Atencio held the “Forum for the International Day of Rural Women-Women Protagonists of Democratic, Equitable and Ecological Progress,” providing training in inclusivity and democracy.

The organization engages women’s mobilization throughout Peru’s mountain, lowland, and coastal regions. It aims to highlight the intersection of gender, cultural, and environmental issues. It also advocates for the promotion of women’s rights within existing cultural frameworks in order to maintain tradition and indigenous self-determination.

FENMUCARINAP and Huanca Atencio are also involved with work regarding indigenous rights and autonomy in Peru. The organization focuses on political rights, legal protection, and self-determination for women. The concept of autonomy is central to the organization; it focuses on personal and bodily autonomy for women as well as land autonomy for indigenous Peruvians. A poster on the wall at the organization’s main office in Lima, Peru reads, “Nuestro Cuerpo, Nuestro Territorio,” translating to “Our Bodies, Our Territories.” FENMUCARINAP’s work also addresses oppression from the patriarchy as well as the colonial system. The organization aims to promote collective rights for indigenous peoples alongside personal rights for women. The phrase "Mi Cuerpo, Mi Territorio" was utilized to send a message regarding the sexual violence that some indigenous women experience in male-dominated communities and to create a social narrative around seemingly separate issues by comparing the protection of land to the autonomy of women.

Furthermore, the organization focuses on addressing the issues regarding gender-based violence in indigenous communities. Huanca Atencio emphasizes how the patriarchal nature of Latin American communities teaches women to tolerate sexual violence and abuse due to machisimo culture. Huanca Atencio also mentions the detrimental effects of merging indigenous Andean cultures with toxic masculinity, stating that toxic masculinity normalizes the exploitation and abuse of women. FENMUCARINAP serves as an outlet by which to address gender violence and combat gender exploitation in Peru's indigenous communities.

FENMUCARINAP is also a platform for women from rural communities to become more educated about their bodies. For indigenous communities in which sex-education is not accessible, FENMUCARINAP, using grassroots organizations, helps familiarize indigenous women with the idea of feminism and the reclamation of their sexuality. FENMUCARINAP aims to become an open-space for women to openly talk about their bodies or about their concerns regarding feminism.

=== FILAC ===
The Fund for the Development of Indigenous Peoples of Latin America and the Caribbean (FILAC) is an international organization that was created in 1992 through a Constitutive Agreement. The primary goal of FILAC is to support the rights and self-development of indigenous peoples throughout Latin America and the Caribbean. Furthermore, FILAC also works to promote environmental sustainability. As of 2017, FILAC has been granted the status of "Permanent Observer of the General Assembly of the United Nations." In 2018, Huanca Atencio held the position of "Indigenous Delegate of Peru before FILAC." The following year, in 2019, Huanca Atencio presented before FILAC through her "Representative of the Work Group of Indigenous Politics" (GTPI) position.

== Political involvement ==
Lourdes Huanca Atencio has campaigned for the improvement of women's rights, indigenous rights, and environmental rights, among others. In 2014, Huanca Atencio supported the Global March to Defend Mother Earth during which people from across the world called for increased action on climate change. Huanca Atencio discussed the importance and significance of the summit and how that support is needed for action to occur.

Regarding her home country, Peru, Huanca Atencio has frequently discussed its internal divisions and economic problems. Furthermore, Huanca Atencio has discussed the importance of Peruvians being united during times of political conflict. Due to her work in the promotion of human rights, Huanca Atencio was officially recognized by Peru's Ministry of Justice and Human Rights in 2020.

Huanca Atencio has remained an active participant in Peruvian politics following the 2022 failed presidential self-coup attempt by then-Peruvian president Pedro Castillo that led to Dina Boluarte taking over the Peruvian presidency. Because of her support of Castillo, Huanca Atencio has been living in exile from Peru as of 2023. However, despite living in exile, Huanca Atencio has continued advocating for the removal of Boluarte from office, the reinstatement of Castillo, and justice for protestors whose rights have been violated by the Boluarte government. In the protests following Castillo's removal from office, at least 21 protestors were killed and allegations have been made by the National Human Rights Coordinator regarding the excessive use of force by police against protestors. Huanca Atencio has emphasized how FENMUCARINAP itself is involved in politics and that achieving its goals depends on how well its members understand their own country's politics.
