= Grim Grinning Ghosts =

Disney theme song

Song
- Composer: Buddy Baker
- Lyricist: Xavier Atencio

"Grim Grinning Ghosts (The Screaming Song)" is the theme song for The Haunted Mansion franchise and its attractions at Disney theme parks. It was composed by Buddy Baker, with lyrics written by X Atencio. Its melody has been adapted for numerous uses since its composition in the late 1960s.

== Background ==
"Grim Grinning Ghosts" features Buddy Baker's melody, usually in the key of A minor, with lyrics by Disney Legend Xavier "X" Atencio. Different variations use 4/4 or 3/4 for the meter. The following chord progression is used for all versions: Am, B, Am, B♭, Am, F, Am, F7, Am, E7, Am. Typically, each chord lasts for two beats of 4/4 or three beats of 3/4. This underlying chord progression provides a macabre mood for the Haunted Mansion attractions. The song modulates to B-flat minor thus: Am, E7, F7, B♭m and on to B-minor via B♭m, F7 and F♯7. The melody then modulates back to A-minor after repeating a dissonant chord six times. When recording the song, the organist actually played the song backwards to achieve the discord that the composer intended. The organ part that can be heard in the song is that tune played forwards.

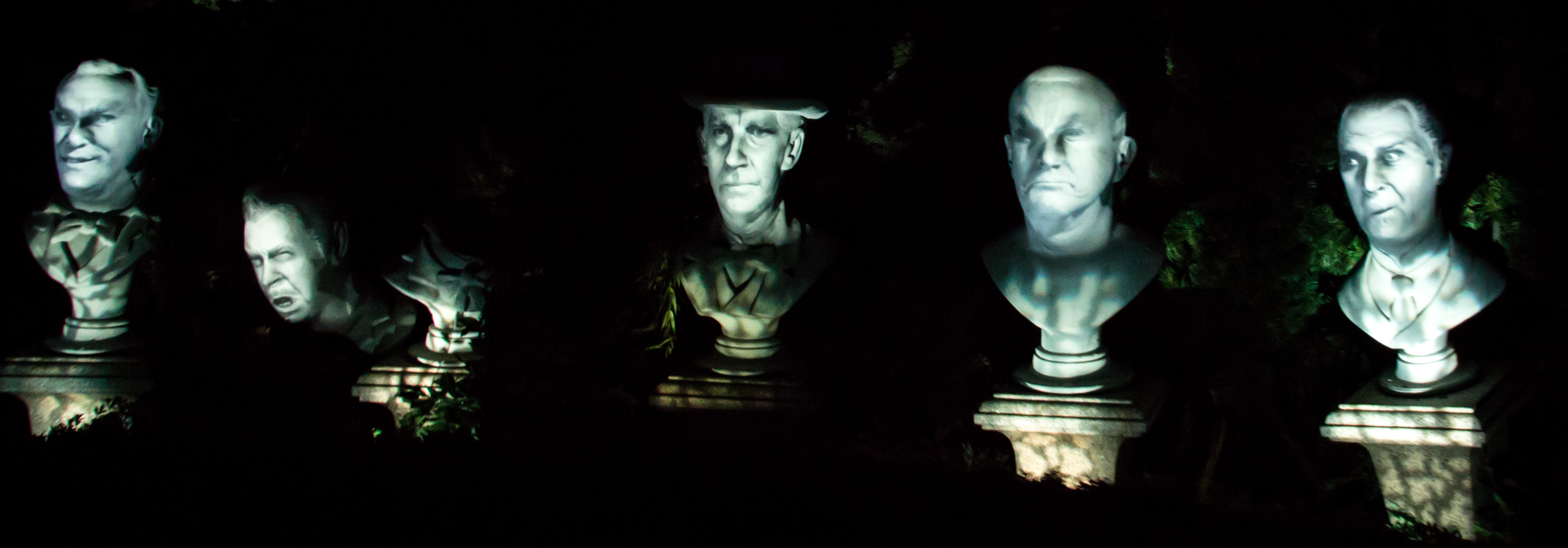
Animated marble busts, an example of the characters in the attraction's climactic graveyard scene that sing the song

The title comes from William Shakespeare's poem Venus and Adonis:

Look, how the world's poor people are amaz'd
At apparitions, signs, and prodigies,
Whereon with fearful eyes they long have gaz'd,
Infusing them with dreadful prophecies;

So she at these sad sighs draws up her breath,
And, sighing it again, exclaims on Death.

'Hard-favour'd tyrant, ugly, meagre, lean,
Hateful divorce of love,'—thus chides she Death,—
'Grim-grinning ghost, earth's worm, what dost thou mean
To stifle beauty and to steal his breath,

Who when he liv'd, his breath and beauty set
Gloss on the rose, smell to the violet?

== Variations ==
=== Haunted Mansion ===
Many different music loops are used throughout the Haunted Mansion attractions at Disneyland, Walt Disney World, and Tokyo Disneyland. Speakers disguised within the sets allow the music to fade in and out as guests pass through the different areas. The following variations of "Grim Grinning Ghosts" can be heard in these attractions.

- Foyer: As guests enter the dimly-lit foyer, a distant organ can be heard. "Grim Grinning Ghosts," played in the slow cadence of a funeral dirge, rumbles through the mansion. This simple arrangement is intended to set the spooky tone for the attraction. It features melody and bass line on a Robert Morton theater organ and an almost inaudible countermelody on tubular bells.
- Load Area: Guests leave the "Stretch Room" and proceed down either a hall of changing portraits (Disneyland), or into the Entrance Hall (Walt Disney World). One of the ride's most unconventional musical selections plays in the background. An alto flute plays a low rendition of Baker's composition, with tubular bells doubling the melody. There is also a wind-like sound effect that follows the pitches of the song.
- Music Room/Grand Staircase: In the Walt Disney World and Tokyo Disneyland versions, guests pass by a decrepit music parlor. A shadowy phantom sits at the piano, playing "Grim Grinning Ghosts" as block chords with heavy rubato. This rendition isn't heard in the original Disneyland mansion, but it was recorded during the production of the original attraction. Many sources claim that Buddy Baker himself performed this piece.
- Séance Circle: Guests pass through the ominous Corridor of Doors (while the foyer organ plays again) and enter Madame Leota's Séance Area. A variety of instruments float through the room, including a harp, a tambourine, and a trumpet. The song's melody hums softly on an organ in the background, while the other instruments fade in and out.
- Ballroom: A 90-foot (27 m)-long mezzanine overlooks the mansion's ballroom, which is swarming with translucent ghosts. On the far left, spirits pour from the pipes of an organ prop as "Grim Grinning Ghosts" howls through the ballroom, this time as a waltz. This piece makes use of unusual chords, including minor/major sevenths and cluster chords. Baker originally approached film organist Gaylord Carter, who had recorded the other organ tracks for the mansion, to improvise for this ballroom waltz; Carter, however, took too sensible an approach with his improvising for Baker's tastes, so Baker took a transcription of Carter's improvisations to William Sabransky. Sabransky then improvised further from the transcription of Carter's own improvisations, producing the effect Baker wanted.
- Graveyard: X Atencio's lyrics are first heard in the graveyard scene. A large number of different music loops play throughout the area. Most of them are ghosts singing the lyrics over a background loop that provides the 1960s style bass line and rhythm section. One of the tracks features a harp, trumpet, oboe, flute, and set of stones, which represents the band of ghosts in the graveyard. All four verses are present, with first two in A minor, the third in B♭ minor, and the fourth in B minor. This presentation of "Grim Grinning Ghosts" is by far the loudest and most noticeable in the ride. In early years, the pop up ghosts in the graveyard would loudly scream at the end of each verse. Although the screams were later removed, the ghosts still pop up in time with the end of each verse.
- Exit: Guests exit their Omnimovers and proceed through the exit crypt, which leads back up to the themed land. A final, somber a capella refrain can be faintly heard with different lyrics, in which the ghosts encourage guests to return and join their social circle as ghosts themselves.

The singing busts in the graveyard scene are voiced by Thurl Ravenscroft, Jay Meyer, Chuck Schroeder, Verne Rowe, and Bob Ebright. A projected film loop is used to animate the busts, with Ravenscroft and the other vocalists appearing as "themselves." The Ravenscroft bust, which is the second one in from the left, is "broken" and has often been misidentified as being an image of Walt Disney himself.

A variation of this song is also used at Disney World's Magic Kingdom HalloWishes fireworks show and Disneyland's Halloween Screams fireworks show. It's also used in parades at Disneyland Paris Resort and Hong Kong Disneyland during the Halloween season.

The seasonal "Haunted Mansion Holiday" overlay at the original Anaheim attraction and Tokyo attraction mixes the tune with Danny Elfman's melody lines from The Nightmare Before Christmas and with Jolly Old Saint Nicholas and Jingle Bells in the graveyard. One of the most prominent instances of this is a straight orchestral statement of the "Grim grinning ghosts come out to socialize" melody line that plays at the end of the cue for the stretching room.

=== Phantom Manor ===
On April 12, 1992, Phantom Manor was opened at Disneyland Park Paris. Based on the original Disneyland ride but with a new backstory tied into Frontierland and Thunder Mesa, Phantom Manor featured a storyline based on the Ravenswood family, one of the founding families of Thunder Mesa. It also had an all-new orchestral soundtrack by composer John Debney. Debney's Phantom Manor soundtrack pays hommage to the original Buddy Baker soundtrack; however, Debney's soundtrack is meant to be an orchestral "theme and variations" versions with added instruments like the organ, honky-tonk piano, and vibraslap. The Phantom Manor soundtrack was originally recorded at Abbey Road Studios in London.

Visitors can hear Grim Grinning Ghosts within Debney's soundtrack in several places throughout the ride:

- In the scene where the piano is playing by itself
- In the dining room / ballroom scene where one of the ghosts is playing it on the pipe organ
- In the bedroom scene where Melanie Ravenswood is humming it while sitting at her vanity table
- In the catacombs where the singing busts are singing the original Buddy Baker song
- Also in the catacombs where a skeleton is playing it on the xylophone
- In the Wild West ghost town where it is played on the honky-tonk piano.

The singing busts in the catacombs scene in the ride uses the same projected film loop from the original Haunted Mansion ride with only 4 busts instead of the original 5. The busts are singing in the catacombs due to an earthquake that shook Phantom Manor and killed Melanie Ravenwood's parents.

Phantom Manor was closed for improvements in 2017 and reopened in 2019. During improvements, restorations were made to the Debney soundtrack by Jake Ellis, Disney Imagineer. Ellis pulled the reels from the original Abbey Road Debney recordings, cleaning them and pulling tracks closer to make the music sound more intimate.

== In film ==
Disney released the videos Disney Sing Along Songs: Disneyland Fun – It's a Small World and Disney Sing Along Songs: Let's Go to Disneyland Paris! as it composed the song, performed once again by Thurl Ravenscroft.

When Walt Disney Pictures released the 2003 film adaptation, composer Mark Mancina was asked to write the film's music. Like Phantom Manor's soundtrack, the movie score is orchestral and uses "Grim Grinning Ghosts" frequently. However, Mancina used "Grim Grinning Ghosts" in somewhat different ways from Debney, focusing more on relatively light-hearted background music and ominous crescendos of orchestra and organ than on waltz-like passion. Cues such as the film's overture allowed Mancina to work with both "Grim Grinning Ghosts" and a theme of his own invention. A scene in the mansion's graveyard also features the attraction's singing busts, whose musical selections include a few lines from the song. The vast majority of the film's music, though, was never officially released as a soundtrack, though copies of a complete album given to staff and orchestra members can occasionally be found for sale. Four minutes of the score did make it onto the "Haunted Hits" CD release, which groups "Sara Passes Out", the overture, and "Going to Heaven" into one track entitled "Overture from The Haunted Mansion". However, none of the orchestral and/or organ statements of "Grim Grinning Ghosts" are heard on this album.

Despite these, the Overture also pays homage to the ride's organ heard in the Foyer and Corridor of Doors, as it is played in a similar style of a funeral dirge, but the melody is done on a cathedral-style organ, with orchestral strings backing it up, creating a more ominous atmosphere.

For the 2023 film Haunted Mansion, director Justin Simien confirmed that composer Kris Bowers included several interpolations of the theme in his score, stating, "Our composer, Kris Bowers, turned those simple phrases into one of the most lush, exciting movie scores I've heard."

== Other media ==
- Soundtrack releases of the song, such as on the Disneyland album in Walt Disney Records: The Legacy Collection, consist of the "Otherworldly Concerto", the Ballroom scene music and the lyrics from the Graveyard scene, before concluding with the a capella refrain and Little Leota's "Hurry back" lines from the exit.
- The song was used as the BGM for the "Haunted Mansion" race track in Walt Disney World Quest: Magical Racing Tour.
- In the House of Mouse episode "House Ghosts", after Pete unleashes them in an attempt to scare the guests out of the club so that he'll be able to shut down the House of Mouse, the Hitchhiking Ghosts perform the song.
- The song can be heard briefly in Toy Story 3: The Video Game in the Toy Box mode. In the Sid's Haunted House level, after clearing the first room, the song plays in a continuous loop until clearing the last room.
- The "Otherworldly Concerto" segment of the song can be heard in the 2015 Disney/Pixar film, Inside Out.
- An EDM remix of the song by record producer The Living Tombstone, featuring Corpse Husband and musical artist Crusher P. was published as a single in November 2016.
- "Rest in Peace", an original song from Muppets Haunted Mansion, incorporates the lyrics of the song's third verse towards its climax.
