= This Is Halloween =

Song by the cast of The Nightmare Before Christmas

from the album The Nightmare Before Christmas: Original Motion Picture Soundtrack
- Published: Buena Vista Music Company
- Released: October 12, 1993
- Recorded: 1993
- Genre: Halloween music
- Length: 3:16
- Label: Walt Disney
- Songwriter: Danny Elfman
- Producer: Danny Elfman

"This Is Halloween" is a song from the 1993 film The Nightmare Before Christmas composed and written by Danny Elfman. In the film, it is performed by the residents of the fictional "Halloween Town", which is the film's main setting, and introduces the town's Halloween-centered lifestyle. The song was also included on the film's soundtrack.

== Background and release ==
"This Is Halloween" was created by Danny Elfman, the main composer for The Nightmare Before Christmas. In the film, it serves as the opening song as the characters of the film introduce themselves and the setting of the film is established.

"This Is Halloween" was covered by the bands Marilyn Manson and Panic! at the Disco in 2006 for the special edition release of the film's soundtrack and subsequently included on the 2008 cover album, Nightmare Revisited.

On the 2011 album V-Rock Disney, which features visual kei artists covering Disney songs, Sadie covered this song. Leetspeak Monsters, a Halloween-themed visual kei band, also covered the song in 2018.

The Swiss/German symphonic metal band Ad Infinitum did a cover in 2020.

The song was performed as part of a virtual Broadway benefit concert hosted by the Disney Music Group on Halloween 2020. Money from the concert was donated to the Lymphoma Research Foundation and the Actors Fund.

In October 2023, the song was added to the soundtrack of the video game Rocket League as part of a Halloween event.

== Composition ==
"This Is Halloween"
A sample of the song, featuring the "This Is Halloween" chant and the time signature switch towards the end.

"This Is Halloween" is performed by an orchestra, consisting of a piano, a string section, woodwind and brass instruments, cowbells, tambourines, a xylophone, and a banjo. The residents of the film's fictional Halloween Town sing the vocal parts. Discussing the song, PopMatters contributors noted various "vocal inflections and character impressions", which make the song "spooky yet magically appropriate". Writer David Ventura highlighted the fact that despite multiple artists often singing simultaneously, their voice lines don't overlap, as they're always at least two octaves apart.

"This Is Halloween" starts in the key of C minor, a moderate tempo and a 4/4 time signature, with every second beat accentuated. According to the journalist Helena Asprou, it "[gives] the music a commanding, march-like quality", with the off-beat emphasis giving it a sense of unpredictability. Rob LeDonne of Billboard magazine described the song as "anthemic". The song's intro, performed by a string orchestra, is built upon the use of staccato eighth and sixteenth notes. According to Asprou, the short, separated notes played in quick succession help establish an eerie atmosphere that persists throughout the composition. The song's chorus follows the intro. It features the "This is Halloween" chant. The chorus is performed in the key of G minor, ending in A-flat minor. Asprou described this ascending chord progression as "the critters [preparing] to scare". At the end of the chorus the song temporarily switches to 3/4 time signature, further emphasizing a sense of uneasiness.

Throughout the song Danny Elfman used repetition, both in lyrics and, more subtly, in music. The main melody is based on a series of three descending notes. Similar to the intro, the main melody features staccato. During the vampire parts, the pace of the song slows down with the use of a contrasting rhythmic pattern of two eighth notes followed by a longer quarter note. The flute and brass instruments on "This Is Halloween" are played in broken arpeggios, which, according to Asprou, allows the song to "portray the destructive nature of witches and corpses". The thrilling atmosphere is then further intensified with the use of crescendos.

== Reception ==
The song was received positively by fans and critics. Mary Sollosi from Entertainment Weekly ranked it as the second best song in The Nightmare Before Christmas, while Darren Franich from the same website described it as a "rousing hymn" and "the October anthem".

Elfman later expressed happiness with the song's longevity, commenting in 2021, "When [Nightmare] came out, I did a two-day press junket and virtually every interview started with: 'Too scary for kids, right?' ... So to come back years later and to see families out there, and to be getting recordings of people's kids who are 4 years old singing 'What's This' or 'This is Halloween,' makes me really feel blessed. It's like a second life and proving them wrong."

== Personnel ==
Credits are adapted from Tidal.

- Danny Elfman – producer, composer, lyricist
- Bob Bodami – associate producer, editor
- Richard Kraft – associate producer
- Chris Boardman – conductor
- Andy Bass – assistant recording engineer
- Bill Easystone – assistant recording engineer
- Mike Piersante – assistant recording engineer
- Sharon Rice – assistant recording engineer

== Charts ==
The soundtrack recording of "This Is Halloween", credited as performed by the Citizens of Halloween, first appeared on the Billboard Hot 100 chart dated November 11, 2023, reflecting streaming, airplay, and sales for the week including Halloween that year.

Chart performance for "This Is Halloween"
Chart (2022–2026)	Peak position
Canada (Canadian Hot 100)	18
Global 200 (Billboard)	41
Hungary (Single Top 40)	36
Ireland (IRMA)	29
Norway (IFPI Norge)	94
Sweden (Sverigetopplistan)	84
UK Singles (Official Charts)	14
US Billboard Hot 100	21

== Certifications ==
Region	Certification	Certified units/sales
United Kingdom (BPI)	Silver	200,000^{‡}
United States (RIAA)	2× Platinum	2,000,000^{‡}
^{‡} Sales+streaming figures based on certification alone.
