= Xavier Atencio =

American entertainer (1919–2017)

Francis Xavier Atencio
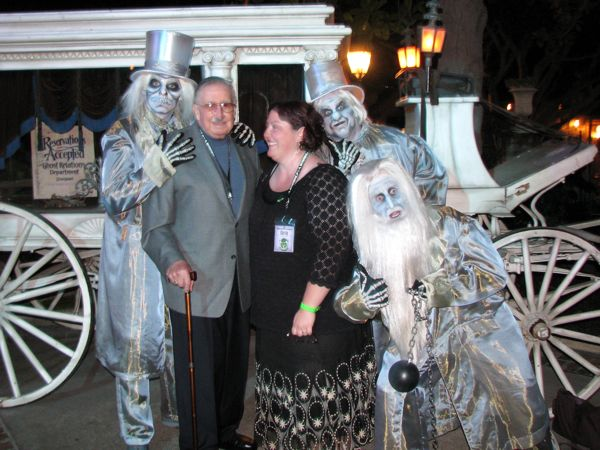
- Atencio at Disneyland's Haunted Mansion in 2008 with Carrie Vines of the Haunted Mansion Collectibles blog
- Born: September 4, 1919; Walsenburg, Colorado, U.S.
- Died: September 10, 2017 (aged 98); Los Angeles, California, U.S.
- Occupations: Imagineer, writer, lyricist, animator, voice actor
- Notable work: Pirates of the Caribbean; The Haunted Mansion; Country Bear Jamboree

Francis Xavier Atencio, also known as X Atencio (September 4, 1919 – September 10, 2017) was an American animator and Imagineer for The Walt Disney Company. He is perhaps best known for writing the scripts and song lyrics of the Disney theme park attractions Pirates of the Caribbean, The Haunted Mansion, and the Country Bear Jamboree.

== Biography ==
Atencio was born in Walsenburg, Colorado in 1919. He was a Disney artist from 1938 to 1965, when he became an Imagineer to help design the Disneyland Railroad's Primeval World diorama segment. He then contributed to various Disney attractions. He wrote the scripts for Adventure Thru Inner Space and Pirates of the Caribbean. For the latter, he also penned the lyrics of "Yo Ho (A Pirate's Life for Me)" and provided the voices of various characters, including the talking skull that appears before the waterfall that carries riders into the main body of the attraction and the drunken pirate on the bridge who heckles the auctioneer.

He also wrote the script for the Haunted Mansion, and the lyrics of its theme song, "Grim Grinning Ghosts (The Screaming Song)." His voice can also be heard emanating from the coffin in the Mansion's conservatory scene. In the Disneyland Mansion, it is Atencio who reads the emergency spiel when the ride comes to a halt.

Another brief voice-over Atencio provided was for the Submarine Voyage Thru Liquid Space, where he is addressed as "Bridge." He also wrote the lyrics to Buddy Baker's music for the retired Magic Kingdom attraction If You Had Wings.

Atencio served as a photo interpreter in the U.S. Army Air Forces from 1941 to 1945 during World War II, reaching the rank of captain in the 2nd Photo Tech Squadron. Stationed in England, he was part of a team that analyzed aerial surveillance.

He retired from The Walt Disney Company in 1984 and was named a Disney Legend in 1996. He died in Los Angeles, California on September 10, 2017, six days after his 98th birthday. His great-nephew is television and film director Peter Atencio.
