= Maria Martinez =

Native American potter (ca. 1887–1980)

Maria Montoya Martinez
- Po've'ka
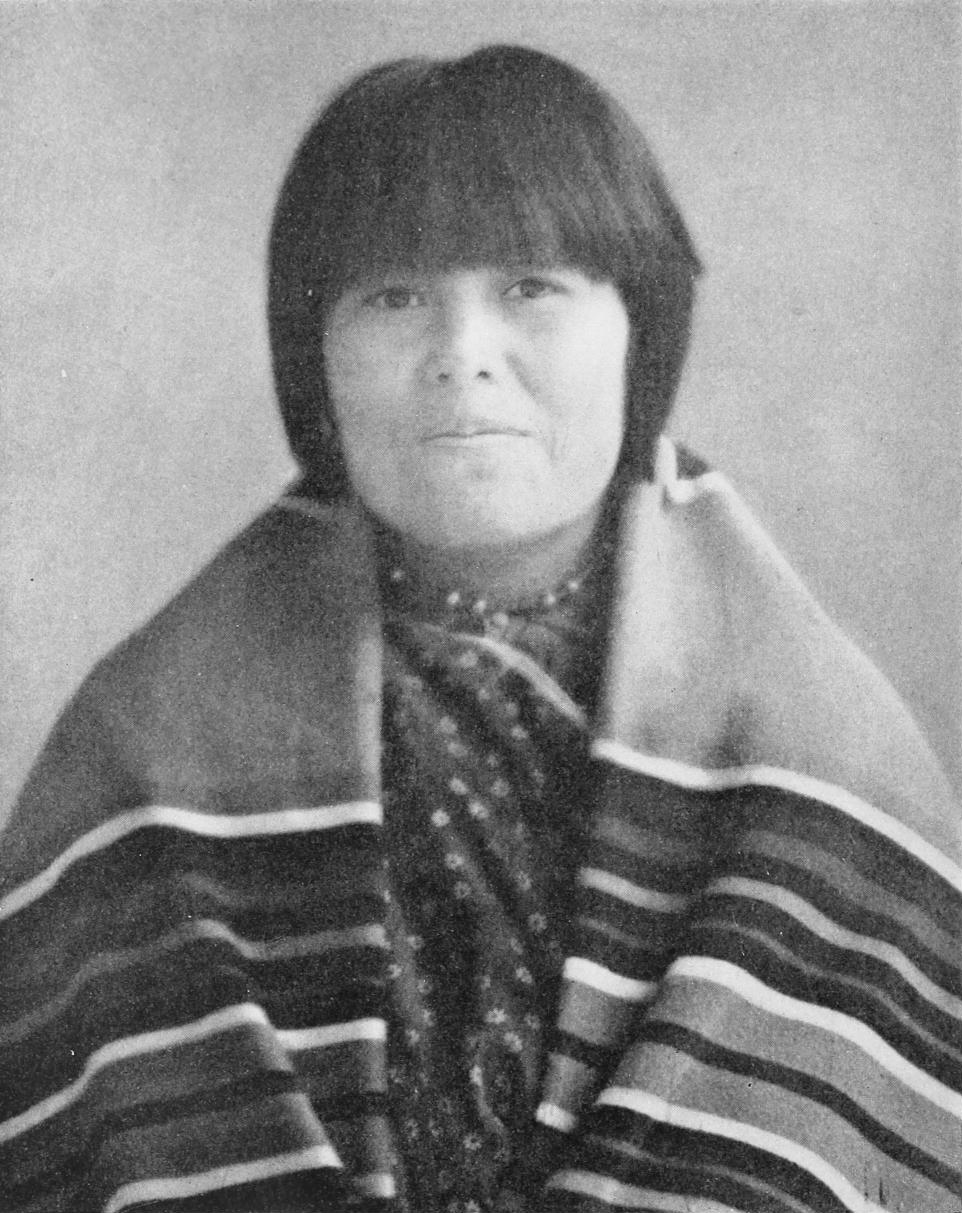
- Martinez c. 1925
- Born: Maria Poveka Montoya ca. 1887; San Ildefonso Pueblo, Territory of New Mexico
- Died: 1980 (aged 92–93); San Ildefonso Pueblo, New Mexico
- Known for: Pottery, Ceramics
- Movement: San Ildefonso School
- Spouse: Julian Martinez

External videos
- Maria Martinez Indian Pottery of San Ildefonso Pueblo, documentary video, 1972.

Maria Poveka Montoya Martinez (c. 1887 – July 20, 1980) was a Pueblo Native American artist who created internationally known pottery. Martinez (born Maria Poveka Montoya), her husband Julian, and other family members, including her son Popovi Da, examined traditional Pueblo pottery styles and techniques to create pieces which reflect the Pueblo people's legacy of fine artwork and crafts. The works of Maria Martinez, and especially her black ware pottery, are in the collections of many museums, including the Smithsonian, the Metropolitan Museum of Art, the Denver Art Museum, and more. The Penn Museum in Philadelphia holds eight vessels – three plates and five jars – signed either "Marie" or "Marie & Julian".

Maria Martinez was from the San Ildefonso Pueblo, a community located 20 miles northwest of Santa Fe, New Mexico. At an early age, she learned pottery skills from her aunt and recalls this "learning by seeing" starting at age eleven, as she watched her aunt, grandmother, and father's cousin work on their pottery during the 1890s. During this time, Spanish tinware and Anglo enamelware had become readily available in the Southwestern United States, making the creation of traditional cooking and serving pots less necessary. Traditional pottery-making techniques were becoming less common, but Martinez and her family experimented with different techniques and helped preserve the cultural art.

== Early life ==
Maria Poveka Montoya was born c. 1886 or 1887. Born in San Ildefonso Pueblo, New Mexico to Tomas and Reyes Pena Montoya, Maria had four sisters: Maximiliana (Ana), Juanita, Desideria, and Clara. Maria was the middle child. Her aunt, Nicolasa, taught her clay work. Martinez and all four of her sisters made pottery, and some examples of her sisters' pottery can be seen in exhibits. Her given name Po've'ka in the Tewa language means 'pond lily' or 'water lily'.

== History ==
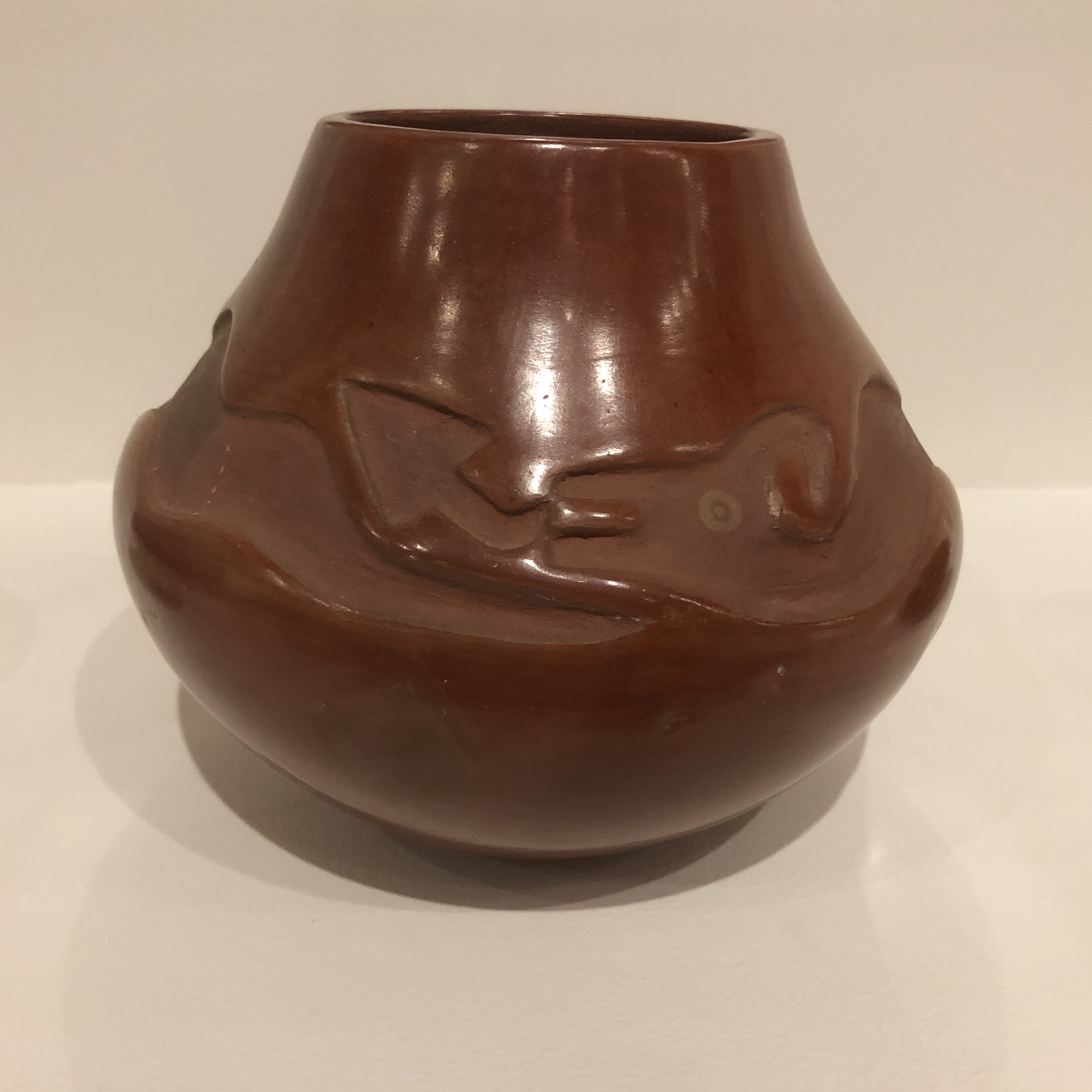
An example of Maria Martinez' early redware work, c1925

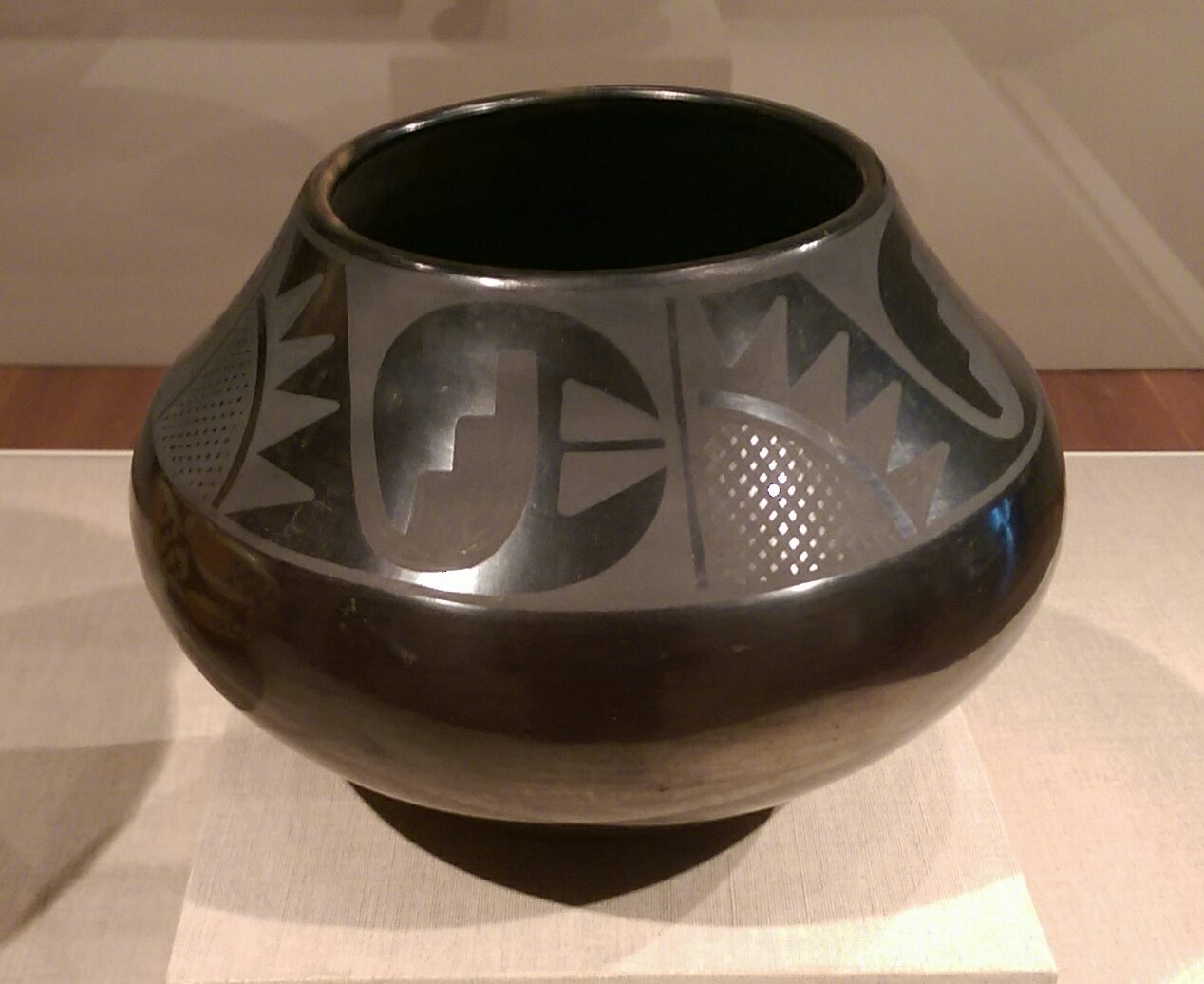
A black-on-black ware pot by Maria Martinez, c.1945, at the de Young Museum

During an excavation in 1908 led by Edgar Lee Hewett, a professor of archaeology and the founder and director of the Museum of New Mexico in Santa Fe, examples of black-on-white biscuit ware pottery were discovered. While searching through the sandy dirt and red clay of the New Mexico desert terrain, broken pieces of biscuit ware were uncovered.

It is a common misconception that "during the end of the 18th century, the use of plant pigments and finely powdered mineral substances became the preferred technique of painting and slowly caused the extinction of glazed pottery". In reality, the nearby inhabitants of Santa Clara Pueblo, had produced the highly burnished black pottery, since the 17th century.

Between 1907 and 1909, Hewett sought out skilled Pueblo potters who could re-create the ancient pots in biscuit ware. His intention was to place recreated pots in museums and thus preserve the ancient art form. Maria Martinez was known in the Tewa pueblo of San Ildefonso, New Mexico for making thin pots quickly. Therefore, either Hewett or his associate, Kenneth M. Chapman, chose Maria as one of several Pueblo potters who would bring his idea to life. This work was distinct from, but invariably confused with (in the popular narrative) the matte black on polished blackware that Maria and her husband experimented with and perfected on their own and for which there was no prior precedent, contrary to popular myth.

== Challenges and experiments ==
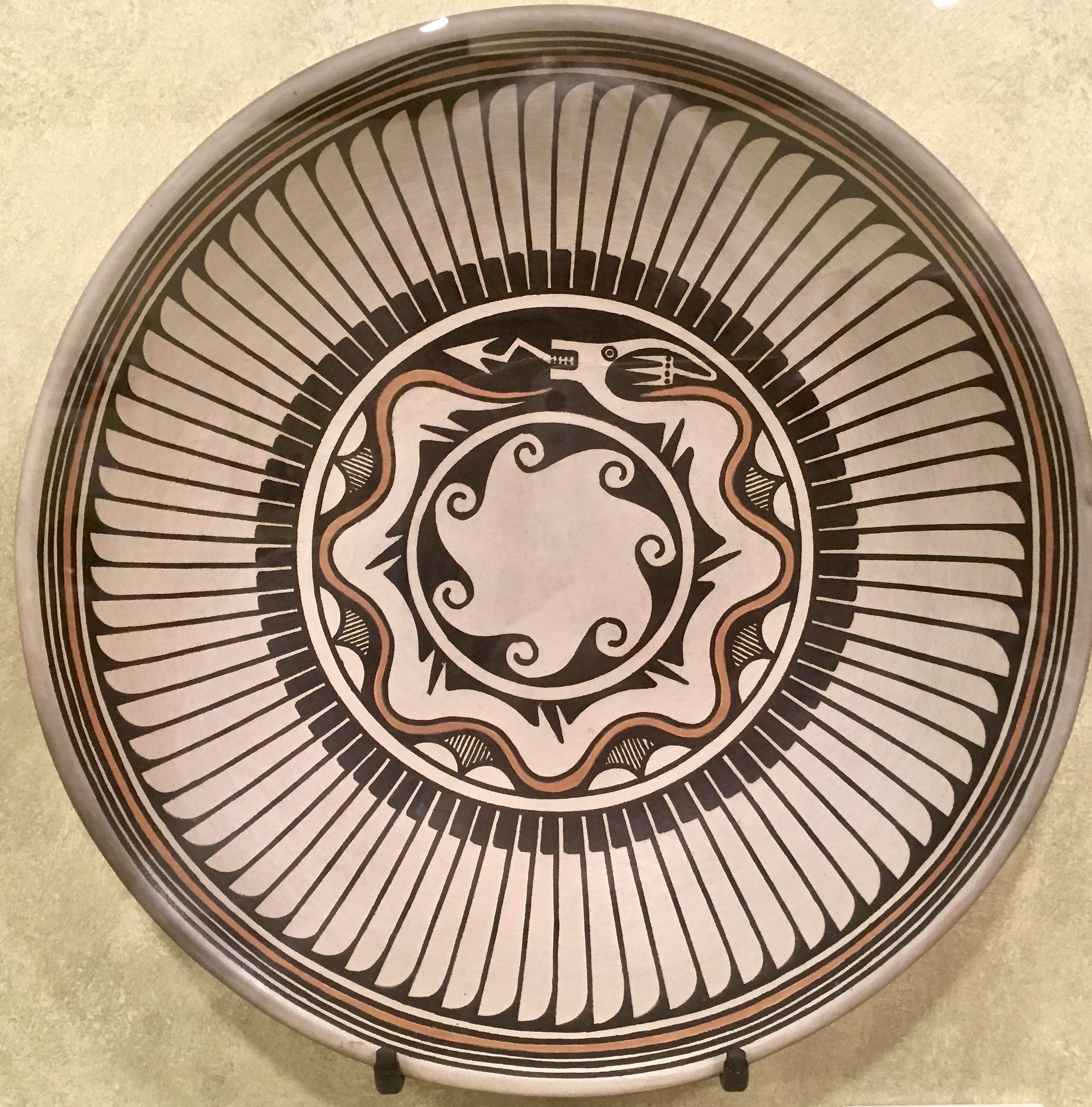
Polychrome Avanyu plate by Maria and Popovi Da, 1969

A long process of experimentation and overcoming challenges was required to successfully recreate the black-on-black ware pottery style to meet Maria's exacting standards. "As almost all clay found in the hills is not jet black, one specific challenge was to figure out a way to make the clay turn the desired color. Maria discovered, from observing the Tafoya family of Santa Clara Pueblo, who still practiced traditional pottery techniques, that smothering the fire surrounding the pottery during the outdoor firing process caused the smoke to be trapped and is deposited into the clay, creating various shades of black to gunmetal color." She experimented with the idea that an "unfired polished red vessel which was painted with a red slip on top of the polish and then fired in a smudging fire at a relatively cool temperature would result in a deep glossy black background with dull black decoration." Shards and sheep and horse manure placed around the outside and inside of the outdoor kiva-style adobe oven would give the pot a slicker matte finished appearance. After much trial and error, Maria successfully produced a black ware pot. The first pots for a museum were fired around 1913. These pots were undecorated, unsigned, and of a generally rough quality. The earliest record of this pottery was in a July 1920 exhibition held at the New Mexico Museum of Art.

Embarrassed that she could not create high quality black pots in the style of the ancient Pueblo peoples, Martinez hid her pots away from the world. A few years later, Hewett and his guests visited the Tewa Pueblo. These guests asked to purchase black ware pottery, similar to Martinez's pots housed in a museum. She was greatly encouraged by this interest and resolutely began trying to perfect the art of black ware pottery. Her skill advanced with each pot, and her art began to cause quite a stir among collectors and developed into a business for the black ware pottery. In addition, Martinez began experimenting with various techniques to produce other shapes and colorful forms of pottery.

== Description of black ware pottery ==
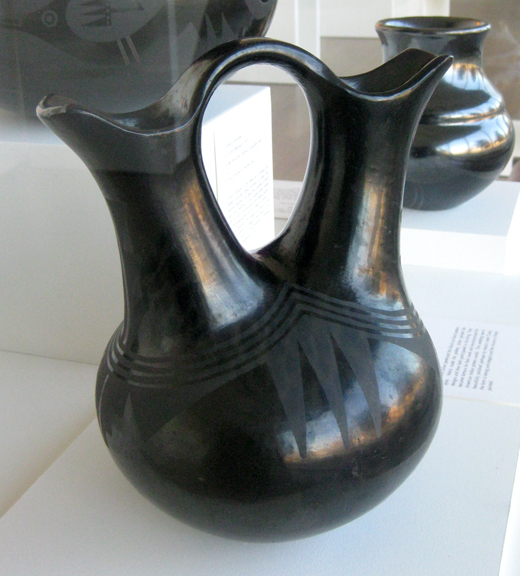
Maria and Julian Martinez matte-on-glossy blackware wedding vase, ca. 1929, collection of the Fred Jones Jr. Museum of Art

An olla jar has a slightly flattened rim and a marked angle at the shoulder. The one created by Maria and Julian Martinez is characteristic of this type, which is "decorated on the rims only, i.e. above the angle of the shoulder." Light is reflected off of the shiny, smooth surface. The jet black ceramic product's finish appears unblemished in any way. A band of a lighter black decoration stands out against a solid black matte background. This type of pot "depends for decorative effect on the manipulation of surface finish alone" to appear as though the decorations are scratched into the pot's surface. The band wraps directly below the narrow neck of the pot. A wide-eyed avanyu, or horned serpent, encircles the pot and slithers inside the band. The serpent's tongue almost touches the tip of his tail. The snake's body movements seem alive; a tribute to the appreciation the Pueblo peoples have for nature and life. The decorations on the pot give the pot a personality and unique individualized look.

== Process ==
Creating black ware pottery is a long process that consists of many steps requiring patience and skill. Six distinct processes occur before the pot is finished. According to Susan Peterson in The Living Tradition of Maria Martinez, these steps include, "finding and collecting the clay, forming a pot, scraping and sanding the pot to remove surface irregularities, applying the iron-bearing slip and burnishing it to a high sheen with a smooth stone, decorating the pot with another slip, and firing the pot."

The first step is to gather the clay, which is done once a year, usually in October when it is dry. The clay is then stored in an adobe structure where the temperature remains constant. The next step is to begin molding the clay to form a pot; the right amount of clay is brought into the house from the storage structure. The clay is placed on a table covered with a cloth. A fist-sized hole is made in the clay and equal amounts of gray-pink and blue sand are placed in the depression. A smaller hole is made in the blue sand and water is poured into the hole. The substances are then kneaded together. The mixture is then wrapped in the cloth, washed, and covered with a towel to prevent moisture from escaping. The clay is allowed a day or two to dry slightly and stabilize. The pukis or "supporting mold, a dry or fired clay shape where a round bottom of a new piece may be formed" allows the potter to build the base of the pot into a pancake-like form. After squeezing the clay together with one's fingers, a 1" high wall is pinched up from the pancake-like base. A gourd rib is used in criss-cross motions to smooth out the wall, making it thick and even. Long coils of clay are laid on the top of the clay wall. These are then smoothed out with the gourd, allowing the potter to increase the height of the pot. Any air holes are patched with clay and sealed with the gourd rib.

After drying, the pot is scraped, sanded, and polished with stones. This is the most time-consuming part of the process. A small round stone is applied to the side of the pot in consistent, horizontal, rhythmic motions. The pot is burnished by rubbing the stone parallel with the side of the pot to produce a shiny, evenly-polished surface. The pot is then ready to fire after a secondary slip is applied. The slip is painted onto the burnished surface in various traditional designs.

=== Firing ===
Martinez used a firing technique called "reduction firing". A reducing atmosphere occurs when the air surrounding the pots does not contain enough oxygen to feed the flames. This causes a chemical reaction that darkens the clay body. The firing process would take many hours in addition to the weeks of preparation beforehand. She often was assisted by her husband or children. The firing occurred early in the morning on a clear, calm day when wind would not hinder the process.

First, the pots were placed in the firing pit, and carefully covered with broken pieces of pottery and aluminum sheets or scrap metal. In order to allow ventilation to keep the fire burning, small spaces were left uncovered. The pit-kiln assembly was then surrounded with cow chips - very dry cow dung - as fuel. The chips were placed carefully in order to leave the vents free. The goal was to prevent any flame from actually touching the pots, hence the protective metal sheets. After covering the kiln with more cow chips, they lit the kindling on all sides to ensure an even distribution of heat. They continued to feed the fire with dry cedar wood until it reached the desired temperature of around 1,200 to 1,400 degrees Fahrenheit, depending on the desired look they intended for the batch of pots. If the fire continued to burn, the pottery would achieve a red-brown color. But in order to make the blackware pottery that Maria was famous for, the fire was smothered with dry, powdered horse dung. By doing this, the amount of oxygen within the kiln was greatly reduced, therefore creating a reduction atmosphere that caused the color of the pots to turn black. After several hours, Martinez shifted the horse dung to extinguish the fire and bury the pots so they could cool slowly. After the pit kiln was cool enough to unload, they carefully removed the pots using a stick if the pots were still hot, or by hand if the pots were cool enough to touch.

=== Decorations ===
Julian Martinez, Maria's husband, began decorating Maria's pots after many trials and errors. "To create his designs, a slurry of clay and water known as slip is created and applied to the already burnished, but yet unfired surface. You cannot polish a design into a matte background, as the stone is not as precise as a brush is." He discovered that painting designs with a guaco juice and clay mixture provided a matte-on-shiny decorative effect. The process involved polishing the background, then matte-painting the designs before firing.

In 1918, Julian finished the first of Maria's blackware pots with a matte background and a polished Avanyu design. Many of Julian's decorations were patterns adopted from ancient vessels of the Pueblos. These patterns included birds, road runner tracks, rain, feathers, clouds, mountains, and zigzags or kiva steps.

=== Signatures ===
Maria Martinez used variations of her signature on her pots throughout her lifetime. These signatures help date the pieces of art. Maria and Julian's oldest works were all unsigned. The two had no idea that their art would become popular and did not feel it was necessary to claim authorship of their work. The unsigned pieces were most likely made between the years of 1918 and 1923. Once Maria gained success with her pottery she began signing her work as "Marie." She thought that the name "Marie" was more popular among the non-Indian public than the name "Maria" and would influence the purchasers more. The pieces signed as "Marie" were made between 1923 and 1925. Even though Julian decorated the pots, only Maria claimed the work since pottery was still considered a woman's job in the Pueblo. Maria left Julian's signature off the pieces to respect the Pueblo culture until 1925. After that, "Marie + Julian" remained the official signature on all of the pottery until Julian's death in 1943. Maria's family began helping with the pottery business after Julian's death. From 1943 to 1954 Maria's son, Adam, and his wife Santana, collected clay, coiled, polished, decorated, and fired pottery with Maria. Adam took over his father's job of collecting clay and painting the decorations. "Marie + Santana" became the new signature on the pots. For about thirty years Maria signed her name as "Marie." Once her son, Popovi Da, began working alongside his mother, Maria began referring to herself as "Maria" on the pottery. They began co-signing their pieces around 1956 as "Maria+Poveka" and "Maria/Popovi."

She won many awards and presented her pottery at several world fairs and received the initial grant for the National Endowment for the Arts to fund a Martinez pottery workshop in 1973. Martinez passed on her knowledge and skill to many others including her family, other women in the pueblo, and students in the outside world. When she was a young girl she had learned how to become a potter by watching her aunt Nicolasa make pottery. During the time that she developed what we now know as the San Ildefonso style of traditional pottery, she learned much from Sarafina Tafoya, the pottery matriarch of neighboring Santa Clara Pueblo. When in 1932 she was asked to teach by the government Indian school in Santa Fe, Martinez refused to do so: "I come and I work and they can watch," she stated. Her family members had not taught her, and she would not do it herself either - "nobody teaches."

== Pottery making process ==
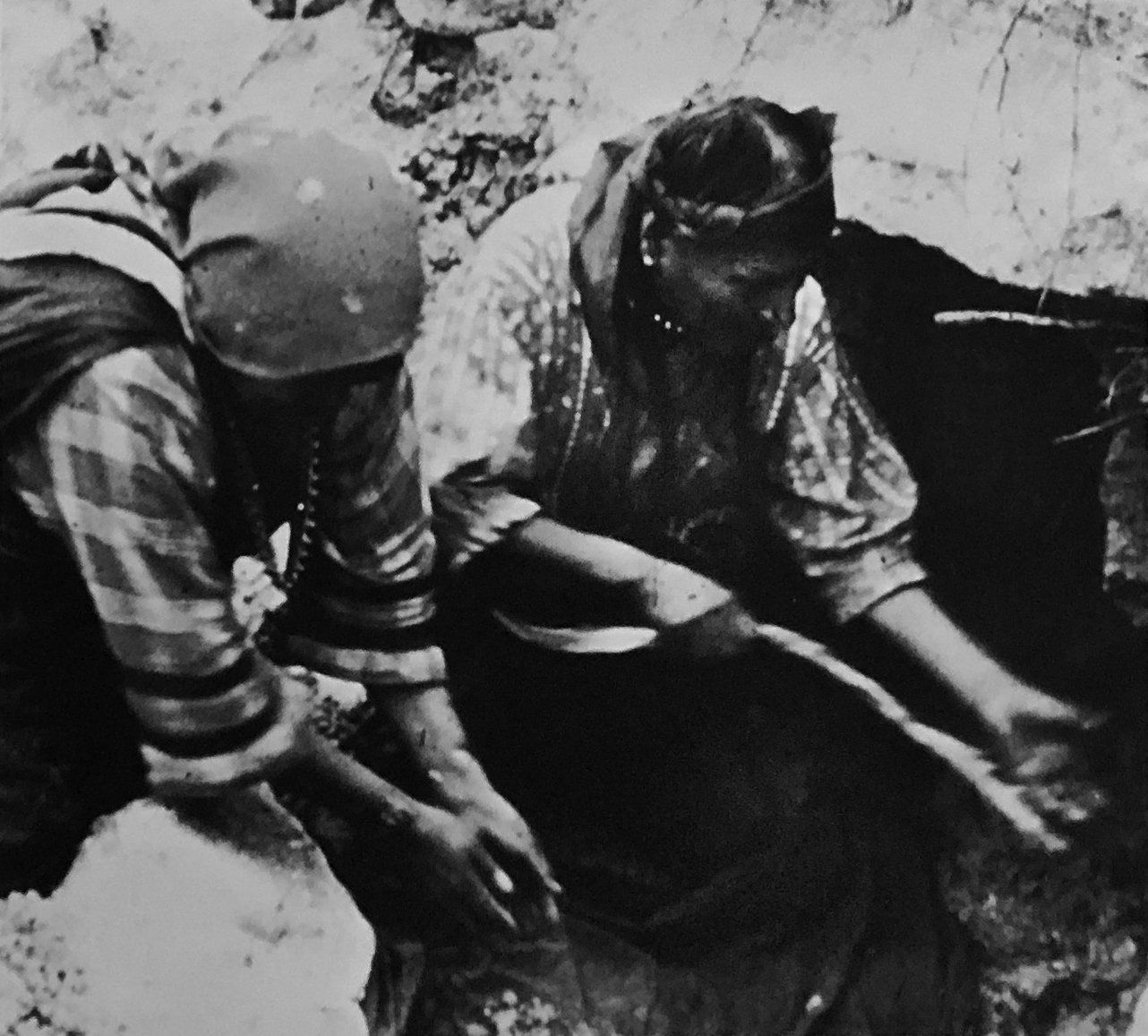
Julian and Maria Martinez digging clay in the early 1920s

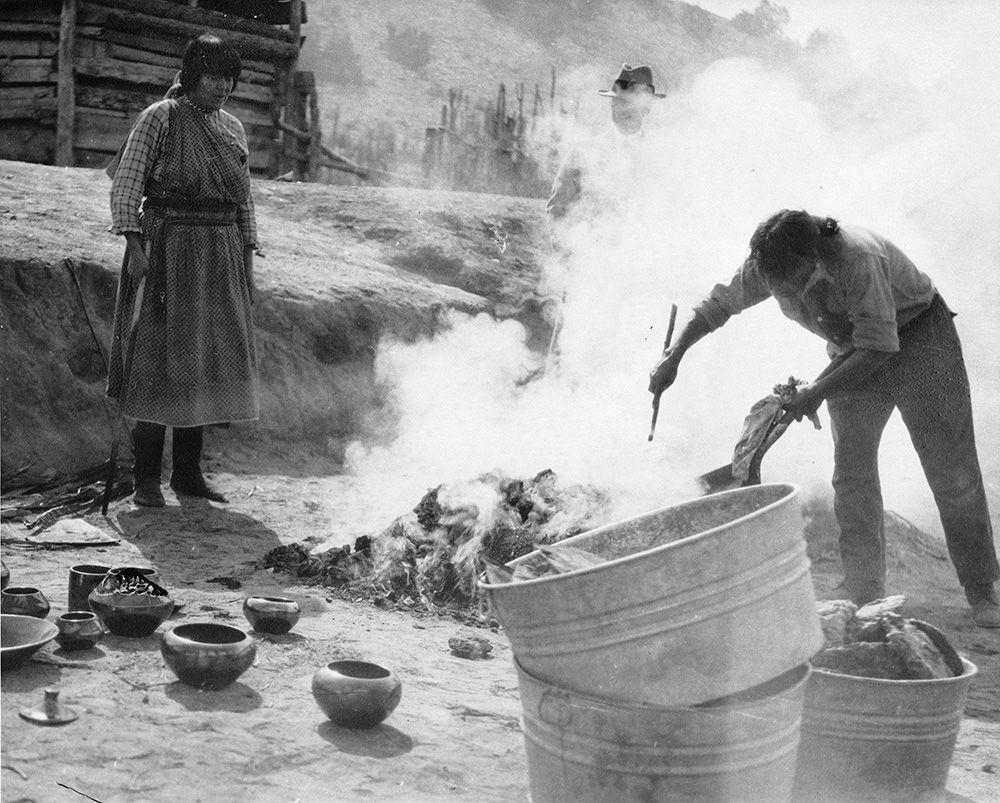
María and Julián Martinez pit firing blackware pottery at P'ohwhóge Owingeh (San Ildefonso Pueblo), New Mexico (c.1920)

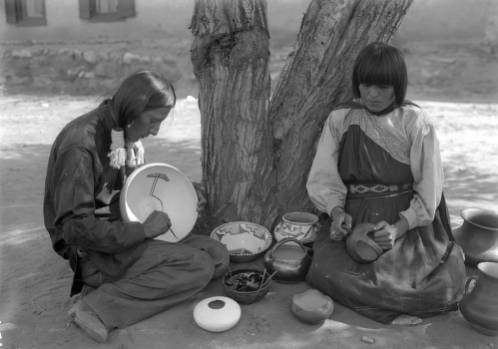
Julian and Maria Martinez decorating pottery, c.1912

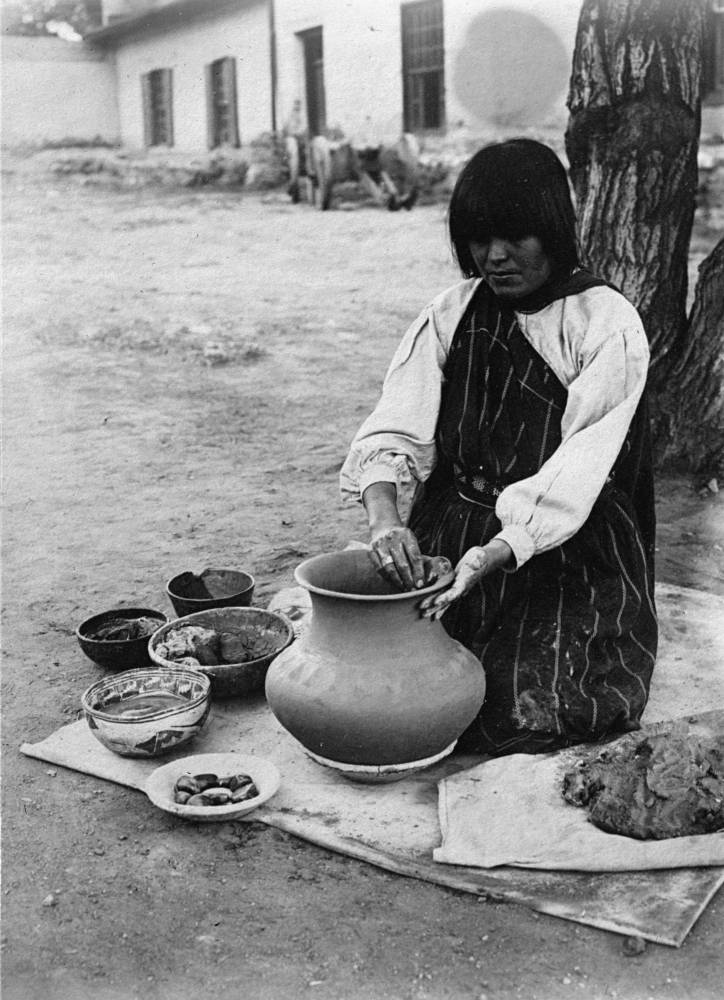
Maria Martinez, 1912, making pottery in the plaza of the Palace of the Governor's, Santa Fe, New Mexico

== Honors ==
Martinez received honorary doctorates during her lifetime from the University of Colorado and the University of New Mexico. Her portrait was created by Malvina Hoffman, a notable American sculptor. In 1978 Martinez had a major solo exhibition at the Renwick Gallery of the Smithsonian Institution. In 2022, Martinez was included in a book on Women's Work, noting the change from feminine arts to feminist art, by Ferren Gipson.

== Collections ==
- Birmingham Museum of Art
- Brooklyn Museum
- Cincinnati Art Museum
- Cleveland Museum of Art
- Crocker Art Museum
- Denver Art Museum
- Everson Museum of Art
- Gilcrease Museum
- Institute of Texan Cultures
- Jesse Peter Multicultural Museum
- Maxwell Museum of Anthropology
- Millicent Rogers Museum
- Minneapolis Institute of Art
- Museum of Fine Arts, Boston
- Museum of Fine Arts, St. Petersburg
- Museum of Modern Art
- National Museum of the American Indian
- National Museum of Women in the Arts
- Portland Art Museum
- Smithsonian American Art Museum
- Toledo Museum of Art
- University of Michigan Museum of Art

== See also ==
- List of indigenous artists of the Americas
- List of Native American artists
- Native American pottery
- American Museum of Ceramic Art Her artworks has been exhibited and are a part of the Permanent Collection
- San Ildefonso Self-Taught Group
- Black-on-black ware
