= Romando Vigil (Tse-Ye-Mu) =

American painter

- Tse Ye Mu
- Born: January 23, 1902; San Ildefonso, New Mexico, U.S.
- Died: 1978; San Bernardino, California, U.S.
- Occupation: Painter
- Movement: San Ildefonso school

Romando Vigil (January 23, 1902 – 1978), also known as Tse Ye Mu, was a Native American self-taught painter and a leader in the San Ildefonso school. He briefly worked for Walt Disney Studios as a painter and illustrator in the 1950s.

He is known for his strong use of simple defining lines to outline his dancing figures and animals. Vigil mostly painted in watercolor, and gouache, and tempera. His paintings depict ceremonial dances and everyday life. Occasionally, he also created abstract and geometric scenes with symbolic iconography, as well as women making pottery. Vigil's works are in the collections of many institutions, including the National Museum of the American Indian and the Smithsonian American Art Museum in Washington D.C.

== Early life and education ==
Romando Vigil was born in San Ildefonso Pueblo, New Mexico, on 23 January 1902 on the pueblo's Feast Day. Vigil's Tewa language name Tse Yemu translates as Falling Water or Falling Cloud. He was the cousin of painter Tonita Peña. His family on both his maternal and paternal sides were potters, and he married into the Martinez family who were renowned San Ildefonso potters.

He was schooled as a young boy at the government-run Santa Fe Indian School, where he learned painting from his teacher Elizabeth Robbins. His early painting career began around 1918 when he began painting Pueblo ceremonial dances and figures in his signature stylized manner. His early career is also characterized by his precise coloring on paper.

== Career ==
Throughout his artistic career, Vigil created many watercolor paintings. Vigil created many watercolor paintings of ceremonial dances of Pueblo men and women, animals, as well as scenes of everyday life. He often created abstract and geometric paintings that recall the work of fellow San Ildefonso school painters, Awa Tsireh (Alfonso Roybal), Richard Martinez (Opa Mu Nu), and Abel Sanchez (Oqwa Pi). His family of potters on both sides likely influenced his paintings of pottery makers, which depict women standing and sitting while shaping and painting vessels. His works do not contain detailed backgrounds, and his figures appear to float. All of Vigil works are signed, some are signed his Tewa name "Tse-Ye-Mu," some are signed "Romando Vigil," and, on rare occasions, his signatures also include either "Santa Fe Indian School" or "Ildefonso Pueblo" below his name.

In 1933 he was commissioned by the Corcoran Gallery of Art in Washington, D.C. to paint a mural for the "Exposition of Indian Tribal Arts," which opened in New York City in 1931. This was the first major exhibition of American Indian Art that traveled across the United States.

After he had been painting for many decades, Vigil moved to San Bernardino, California in the 1950s and began working as an illustrator and animator. While working for Disney, some claim that he created sketches for the animated film Bambi, although this information is disputed as the film debuted before his time at Disney in 1942. Vigil was employed by Walt Disney Studios located in Hollywood, California briefly in the early 1950s and again in the 1960s and 70s. His work at Disney might have affected the style of his works. Many of his paintings from this stage in his career are more animated in comparison to his earlier works, particularly his paintings of dancing figures. Moreover, he began painting his figures with disproportionately sized heads, large eyes, and bulky feet. His paintings became more cartoonish owing to these characteristics. Author of Southwest Indian Painting: A Changing Art, Clara Lee Tanner, described his animals not being proportionate in size in most of his paintings.

In the mid-to-late 1950s, Vigil went on two European tours sponsored by the University of Oklahoma. During these tours, he likely saw artworks of European artists, which also might have influenced his later works.

Vigil died in 1978 in San Bernardino, California.

== Museum collections ==
Romando Vigil's works can be found in art collections across the United States, including the Denver Art Museum, Gilcrease Museum, National Museum of the American Indian, Smithsonian American Art Museum, Philbrook Art Center, Museum of Fine Arts Houston, Museum of Fine Arts, Boston, Brandeis University's Special Collections, and the Herbert F. Johnson Museum of Art at Cornell University.

Outside of museum and gallery collections, some of his works reside at the La Fonda Hotel in Santa Fe, New Mexico, at the Indian School in Santa Fe, and in private collections.

== Personal life ==
He was the husband of potter Juanita Montoya Vigil (1898–1933), who was the youngest sister of renowned potter, Maria Martinez (1887–1980). Vigil was also the father of two children that were potters, Carmelita Dunlap and Albert Vigil.
