= Otis Polelonema =

Hopi painter, illustrator, weaver, song composer, and educator (1902–1981)

- Born: February 21, 1902; Hopi Reservation, Shongopovi, Navajo County, Arizona, U.S.
- Died: December 27, 1981 (aged 79)
- Other names: Lomadamocvia, Lomada-moc-via, Springtime
- Citizenship: Hopi Tribe
- Occupations: Artist, musician
- Known for: Painting, weaver, song composer
- Spouse: Jessie Salaftoche
- Children: 6

Otis Polelonema (1902–1981), was a Hopi painter, illustrator, weaver, song composer, and educator. He lived in Shongopovi most of his life. He also worked as a WPA artist in the mural division. His native name in the Hopi language is Lomadamocvia which translates to "springtime".

== Biography ==
Otis Polelonema was born on February 21, 1902, the Hopi Reservation in Shongopovi (Hopi: Songòopavi), Arizona. He learned to weave from his father and uncles, as it is tradition in Hopi culture for the men to be weavers. Polelonema worked as a sheep farmer in his early life and again in later life.

In 1914, he attended the Santa Fe Indian School, under the supervision of John DeHuff. Polelonema took after-school art instruction classes at Elizabeth Willis DeHuff's house, studying alongside Fred Kabotie, Velino Shije Herrera, Awa Tsireh, and others. He remained in Santa Fe until 1920, then returned to his hometown.

In 1925, Polelonema married Jessie Salaftoche, and together they had 6 children. His son Tyler Polelonema is a noted artist.

Polelonema stopped painting in the 1970s, and started to focus on Hopi traditions and Hopi cultural arts. In late life, he worked as a song composer of Hopi ceremonial dances, including songs of the Gray Flute society. He taught Hopi weaving in 1971 at Mary Pendleton's Pendleton Fabric Craft School in Sedona, Arizona.

== Death and legacy ==
Otis died on December 27, 1981, at Shungopovi, during the Solstice Ceremony. However, sometimes 1972 is attributed as his year of death.

Polelonema's artwork can be found in museum collections, including at the Heard Museum, Gilcrease Museum, McNay Art Museum, New Mexico Museum of Art (formerly Museum of New Mexico Art Gallery), National Museum of the American Indian, and the Detroit Institute of Arts museum. His work is also part of the Elizabeth Willis DeHuff Collection of American Indian Art at Beinecke Rare Book and Manuscript Library, Yale University.

== Publications ==
- DeHuff, Elizabeth Willis (1922). Taytay's Tales, collected and retold. Fred Kabotie (illustrator), Otis Polelonema (illustrator). New York City, NY: Harcourt, Brace and Company.
