= Velino Herrera =

Native American painter from New Mexico (1902–1973

Velino Shije Herrera
- Ma Pe Wi
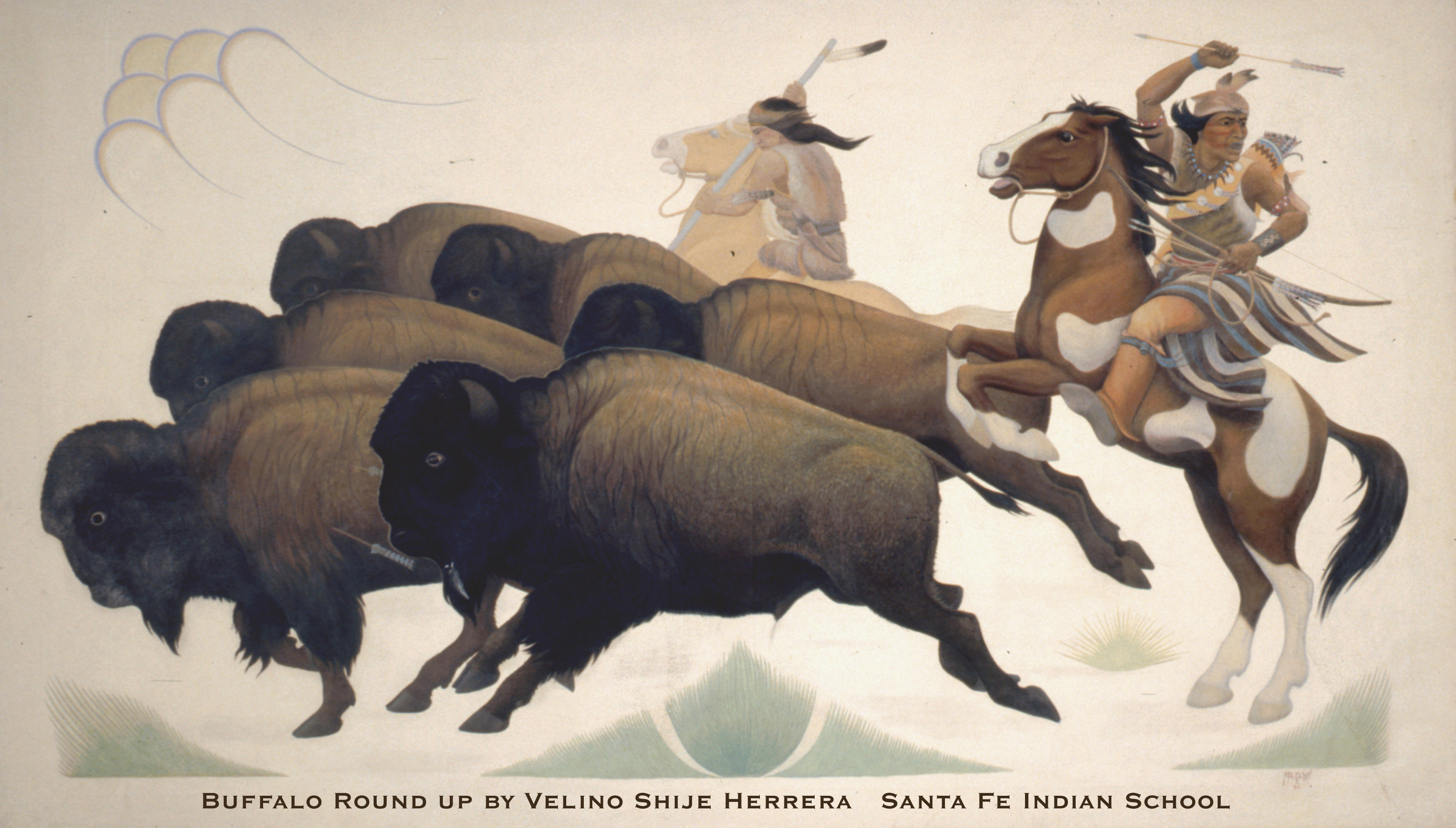
- "Buffalo Round," mural by Velino Shije Herrera
- Born: October 22, 1902; Zia Pueblo, NM
- Died: January 18, 1973 or January 30, 1973 (aged 70); Albuquerque, New Mexico
- Citizenship: Zia Pueblo and American
- Education: Santa Fe Indian School
- Known for: Painting
- Style: Flatstyle
- Patrons: Edgar Lee Hewett

Velino Shije Herrera (October 22, 1902 – January 1973),^{note} also known as Ma Pe Wi, was a Zia Pueblo Indian painter.

== Biography ==
Born in Zia Pueblo, New Mexico, Herrera attended the Santa Fe Indian School. The Bureau of Indian Affairs prohibited arts training, but the wife of the superintendent of the school, Elizabeth Willis DeHuff, invited Herrera and his fellow students Fred Kabotie, Otis Polelonema, and Awa Tsireh to paint in her living room. DeHuff's painting groups have been described as a seminal event in the development of the Southwest Movement of Native American painting. The work of DeHuff's students were displayed at the Museum of New Mexico in 1919 and museum director Edgar Lee Hewett hired Herrera and other artists for various jobs at the museum and for the School of American Research. Herrera said, "Dr. Hewett selected a few he thought had talent and started us to painting. I was one. I have been painting ever since."

Following the exhibition at the Museum of New Mexico, press coverage promoted their work and the next year they were included in the annual exhibition of the Society of Independent Artists in New York. Herrera's work was widely exhibited in the US and Europe and included in the Exposition of Tribal Indian Arts traveling show (1931–33). He and five other artists were commissioned to paint 2200 feet of murals for the Main Interior Building of the US Department of the Interior in Washington, DC. Herrera's work included detailed, representational depictions of Pueblo life, including ceremonial kachina dances, and abstract works based on Pueblo symbolism. The work of Herrera and other Native American artists was not always viewed positively in their native communities, especially when it came to depictions of restricted ceremonies. Herrera was eventually ostracized by Pueblo elders.

Herrera's illustrative work included educational materials for the Bureau of Indian Affairs. He illustrated a number of books for author Ruth Underhill. In My Mother's House, a book that he illustrated for Bureau of Indian Affairs author Ann Nolan Clark, was named a Caldecott Honor book in 1942.

In 1954, he was awarded the French Ordre des Palmes Académiques. He largely abandoned painting after being seriously injured in a car accident, which also killed his wife.

== Notes ==
1.The St. James Guide to Native North American Artists reports the date of death as January 30, while Oxford Art Online reports it as January 18.
