= Tonita Peña =

Native American painter and muralist

- Quah Ah
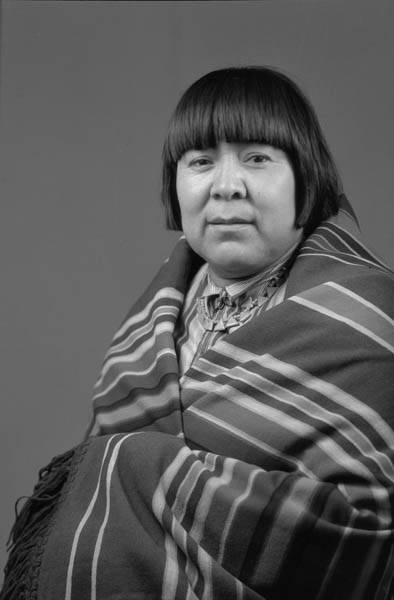
- Born: May 10, 1893; San Ildefonso Pueblo, New Mexico, U.S.
- Died: September 9, 1949 (aged 56); Kewa Pueblo, New Mexico, U.S.
- Resting place: Cochiti Pueblo Cemetery, Cochiti Pueblo, Sandoval County, New Mexico
- Known for: American Indian painting, Pueblo art
- Style: pen and ink with watercolor on paper, murals
- Movement: San Ildefonso Self-Taught Group
- Spouse(s): Juan Rosario Chavez (m. 1908–1910; death), Felipe Herrera (m. 1913–1920; death), Epitacio Arquero (m.1922–1949; death)
- Children: 6, including Joe Hilario Herrera
- Relatives: Martina Vigil Montoya (aunt)
- Patrons: Edgar Lee Hewett

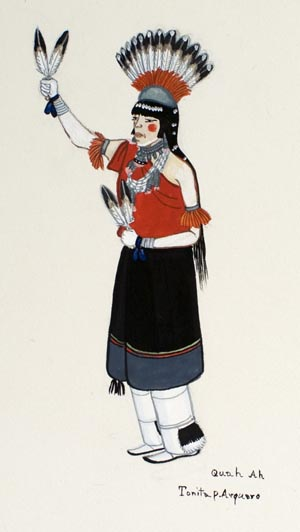
Painting, dancer

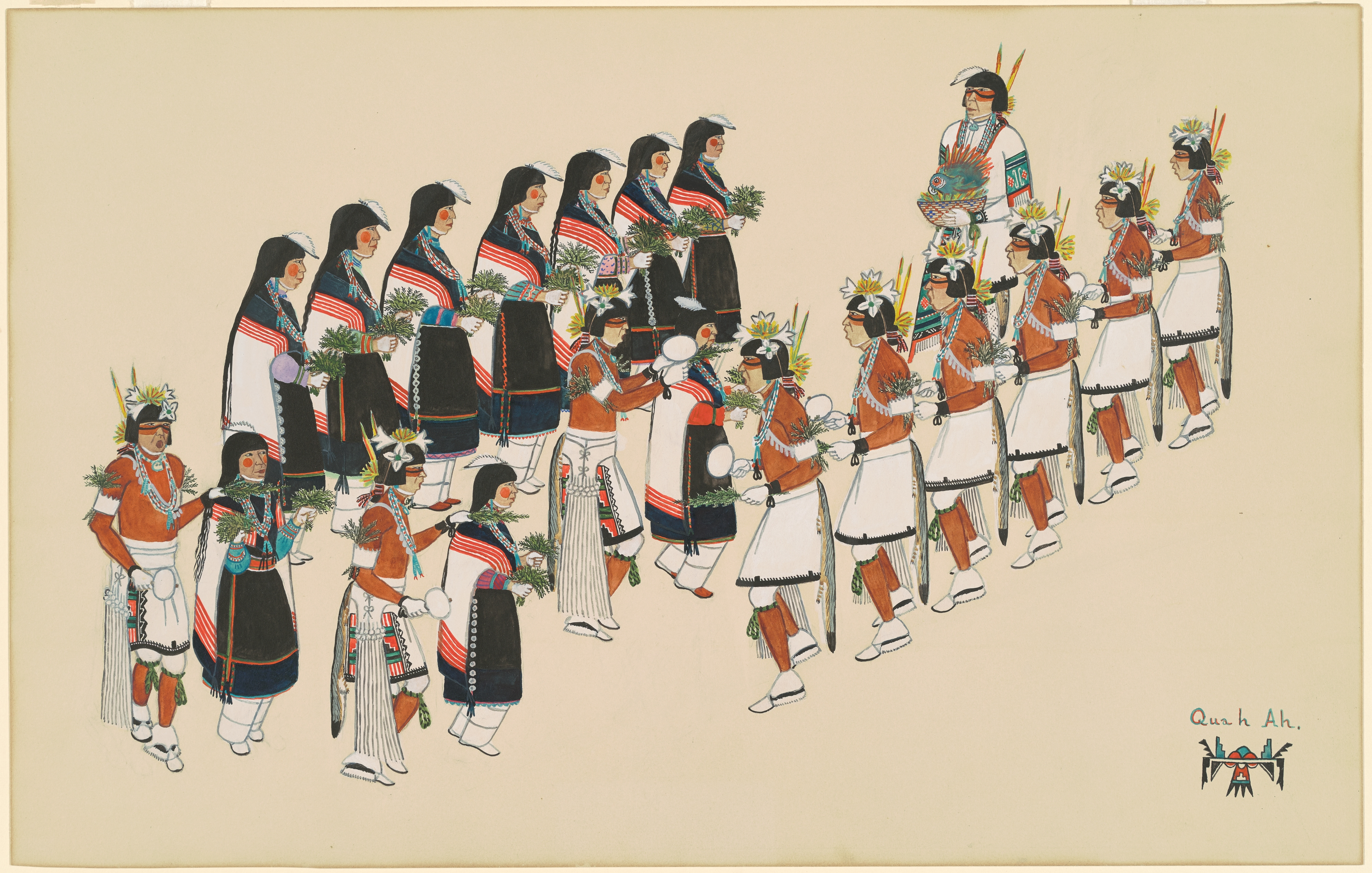
Hopi Corn Dance

Tonita Peña (May 10, 1893 – September 9, 1949) born as Quah Ah (Tewa: Kwʼáˀaa, transl. "white coral beads") and also known as Tonita Vigil Peña and María Antonia Tonita Peña, was a renowned Pueblo artist, specializing in pen and ink on paper embellished with watercolor. She was a well-known and influential Native American artist and art teacher of the early 1920s and 1930s.

== Early life and education ==
Tonita Peña was born on May 10, 1893, at San Ildefonso Pueblo, New Mexico to parents Ascensión Vigil Peña and Natividad Peña. When she was 12, her mother and younger sister died, as a results of complications due to the flu. Her father was unable to care for her and she was taken to Cochití Pueblo and was brought up by her aunt Martina Vigil Montoya, a prominent Cochití Pueblo potter. Peña attended St. Catherine Indian School in Santa Fe.

== Career and later life ==
Edgar Lee Hewett, an anthropologist involved in supervising the nearby Frijoles Canyon excavations (now Bandelier National Monument) was instrumental in developing the careers of several San Ildefonso "self taught" artists including Tonita Peña. Hewett purchased Peña's paintings for the Museum of New Mexico and supplied her with quality paint and paper. Peña began gaining more notoriety by the end of the 1910s selling an increasing amount to her work to collectors and the La Fonda Hotel. Much of this early work was done of Pueblo cultural subject matter, in a style inspired by historic Native American works, however her use of an artists easel and Western painting mediums gained her acceptance among her European-American contemporaries in the art world. At the age of 25, she exhibited her work at museums and galleries in the Santa Fe and Albuquerque area.

In the early 1920s Tonita did not know how much her painting sold for at the Museum of New Mexico, so she wrote letters to the administrators because a local farmer was worried that she got paid too little.

In the 1930s Peña was an instructor at the Santa Fe Indian School and at the Albuquerque Indian School and the only woman painter of the San Ildefonso Self-Taught Group, which included such noted artists as Alfonso Roybal, Julian Martinez, Abel Sánchez (Oqwa Pi), Crecencio Martinez, and Encarnación Peña. As children, these artists attended San Ildefonso day school which was part of the institution of the Dawes Act of 1887, designed to indoctrinate and assimilate Native American children into mainstream American society.

In 1931, Tonita Peña exhibited at the Exposition of Indian Tribal Arts which was presented at the Grand Central Art Galleries in New York City. Works from this exhibition were shown at the 1932 Venice Biennial. That year is the only time Native American artists have shown in the official United States pavilion at that biennial, and Tonita Peña's paintings were part of that exhibition. Her painting Basket Dance, that had shown in the Venice Biennial was acquired by the Whitney Museum of American Art in New York for $225. This was the highest price paid up to this time for a Pueblo painting and most Native American paintings at this time were selling between $2 and $25.

Peña's work was part of Stretching the Canvas: Eight Decades of Native Painting (2019–2021), a survey at the National Museum of the American Indian George Gustav Heye Center in New York.

== Death and legacy ==
Peña died on September 9, 1949. At Peña's death, all of her remaining paintings and personal effects were burned in compliance with Pueblo customs.

Native arts, from utilitarian arts to easel arts, influenced modern European-Americans' changing perspectives of the aesthetic and spiritual value of Native American cultures and identities. Peña's artwork emphasized the role of women in everyday life and is credited with expanding the expectations of women in art by refusing to limit herself to the customary female role of potter. Her son Joe Herrera, heavily influenced his mother, became an important figure in American modernism.

Peña's artwork is in the collections at the American Museum of Natural History in New York, the Cleveland Museum of Art in Ohio, the Cranbrook Institute of Science in Michigan, the Acequia Madre House in Santa Fe, NM the Heard Museum in Arizona, the Dartmouth College Collection in New Hampshire, the Haffenreffer Museum of Anthropology at Brown University, and the Peabody Museum at Harvard. She has continued to have national art exhibitions posthumously.

A crater on the planet Venus has been named after Tonita Peña.

== Affecting social change ==
Peña did not accept the established roles of women in arts within the early 20th-century Native American art market. She focused primarily on two-dimensional works on paper rather than the more established accepted pottery medium of her contemporaries. Beyond her choice of medium, Peña's subject matter also pushed gender boundaries. At the time she was active, only men were allowed to portray living individuals in their work. Another way Peña rejected traditional roles of women was how she approached her role as a mother. Contrary to the traditions of her tribe and America at large, she chose to have others raise some of her children, so that she could focus on completing her education and also furthering her career. During her lifetime, the U.S. government pushed the idea of assimilating Native Americans within American culture. Peña's artwork emerged as a site of resistance towards those efforts, reaffirming the importance of ceremonial dances as crucial for Pueblo cultural survival.

=== Critics ===
Critique of Peña can be found within the framework of studying "traditional" Native American art versus "White patronage"-supported Native American art. Artwork made by Native Americans and collected by White patrons served no traditional function in Native American communities. Peña's critics were not only the established art world, but also her own tribe. Many of Peña's paintings depicted sacred rituals and her fellow tribespeople believed these were inappropriate subject matters to portray and share outside the tribe. Epitacio Arquero, Governor of the Pueblo and Peña's husband at the time of the most heated protests, defended the subject matter, saying her paintings only depicted subject matter already visible to outsiders. Following the controversy, Peña's work changed to focus on Pueblo culture and traditions that were not sacred or private in nature.

== Personal life ==
Tonita married three times and had six children. Peña's first marriage was in 1908 at the age of 15, arranged by village elders to Juan Rosario Chavez, however he died in 1912. She had two children with Chavez, and after he died she was able to leave the children temporarily with her aunt Martina Montoya, so she could finish her high school education.

In 1913 Peña had a second arranged marriage, this time to Felipe Herrera, who died in a mining accident in 1920. Their son Joe Hilario Herrera was a notable painter.

Her final marriage was in 1922 to Epitacio Arquero, a politician who held important tribal offices at the Cochiti Pueblo, and together they had three children.

== See also ==
- Oasisamerica
- List of Native American artists
- Visual arts by indigenous peoples of the Americas
