= Elizabeth Willis DeHuff =

American painter, teacher, playwright, and writer (1886–1983)

- Born: Elizabeth Mary Willis; 1886; Augusta, Georgia, US
- Died: 1983 (aged 96–97)
- Education: Lucy Cobb Institute, Barnard College
- Occupations: Artist, educator, writer
- Known for: Development of Native American easel painting, as well as her own painting, children's literature
- Works: Taytay's Tales, Taytay's Memories, Kaw-eh, Swift-Eagle of the Rio Grande, Say the Bells of Old Missions: Legends of Old New Mexico Churches, Blue-Wings-Flying
- Spouse: John David DeHuff

Elizabeth Willis DeHuff (1886–1983) was an American painter, teacher, playwright, and children's book writer. She was an important contributor to the development of Native American easel painting in the 1920s and 1930s. DeHuff is also a children's book author who writes predominantly utilizing Native American folklore and themes. Among these books are Blue-Wings-Flying and TayTay's Tales. In writing these children's books, and other works by her like Kaw-eh and Say the Bells of Old Missions: Legends of Old New Mexico Churches that are not necessarily children's books, DeHuff is instrumental in documenting Native American folklore and providing authenticity in the telling of it. Overall, she wrote 65 works in 118 publications. These other works included non children's books and periodical articles Native American, Hispanic, and New Mexico subjects.

== Early life and education ==
Elizabeth Mary Willis was likely born in 1886, though some people say 1892, in Augusta, Georgia. She was born to parents John Turner and Ann Boyd Wilson Willis as one of their five children. Her parents were of European descent.

She went to school at the Lucy Cobb Institute in Athens, Georgia. Later, she went to Barnard College in New York City for her teaching degree, and then she went to the Philippines to teach in 1910. During her time there, she met her husband, John David DeHuff.

Upon returning to the United States, she married John David and then went to live in Pennsylvania in 1913. Her husband's job was at the Carlisle Indian School there.

== Santa Fe ==
However, it wasn't until 1916 that she first really started to get involved with Native people by following her husband to Santa Fe, New Mexico. She was twenty-four years old at the time.

Her fascination with Native American culture quickly started developing as she became involved with the community surrounding the Santa Fe Indian School, which her husband had become the superintendent of. As a result of the Bureau of Indian Affairs prohibiting arts training, she became an art instructor, particularly on that of painting, starting from inside her own home. Her students included Fred Kabotie (Hopi), Otis Polelonema (Hopi), Velino Shije Herrera (Zuni), Awa Tsireh (San Ildefonso Pueblo), and others. Her teaching of painting to these students has been described as a seminal event in the development of the "Southwest Movement of Native American painting".

In 1919, the work of DeHuff's students was displayed at the Museum of New Mexico. As a result of her instruction methods, some people accused her lessons of pushing beliefs of paganism onto students. This was because the works resulting from her instruction reiterated tribal stories and customs of Native Americans.

DeHuff's first children's book was published in 1922 called Taytay's Tales. Art from Fred Kabotie and Otis Polelonema, her students, were included in this work. This was the first book illustrated by Native Americans. She often had students or former students illustrate her works for children. Her next children's book was published in 1924, Taytay's Memories. In 1924, a play DeHuff wrote, Kaw-eh, was performed by students from Santa Fe Indian School.

While she was in Santa Fe, DeHuff also took part in many civic and artistic events. In general, she also wrote multiple periodical articles on American Indian, Latin American, and New Mexico historical and cultural topics as well as publishing regularly in the magazine of the Museum of New Mexico, El Palacio.

By 1927, DeHuff was no longer directly in contact with students as she left for another school with her husband. From about this time till about 1945, she took part in the Santa Fe Indian Detours where she lectured several nights a week at La Fonda Hotel. Her closeness thus continued with Native Americans throughout her life. As a result, she maintained her friendship and encouragement of Indian artists, especially that of Fred Kabotie, who she was especially close to.

In 1943 she published her book, Say the Bells of Old Missions: Legends of Old New Mexico Churches, in which DeHuff is noted for her documentation of thirty different folktales as presented by Catholic Native Americans of New Mexico. Like all of her works, it is also noticed for its use of illustrations. Unlike her other works, the illustrations in this book are that of photographs while her other works contain significantly more artwork created by hand. It also provides readers with history on New Mexico missions initiated by the Catholic Church.

== Late life ==
Two years later, 1945, DeHuff's husband, John David, died, resulting in DeHuff going back to Georgia. In 1977, DeHuff wrote her final children book, Blue-Wings-Flying.

She continued her writing there and took on genealogical research writing until she died in 1983. Historians have noted that DeHuff's were significant patrons of Pueblo culture. In life, DeHuff had three children by the name of David, Ann, and Frances.

Postmortem, DeHuff's collection of Native American artwork became most of the work incorporated in the Elizabeth Willis DeHuff Collection of American Indian Art, which contains 199 pieces of art from different Native American artists from various tribes kept at the Beinecke Rare Book and Manuscript Library, Yale University. Represented in the collection are more than fifty-five Native American artists.

== Works ==
- DeHuff, Elizabeth Willis (1922). Taytay's Tales, collected and retold. Fred Kabotie (illustrator), Otis Polelonema (illustrator). New York City, NY: Harcourt, Brace and Company.
- Taytay's Memories (1924)
- Kaw-eh (1924)
- From Desert and Pueblo : Five Authentic Navajo and Tewa Indian Songs (1924)
- Telling Stories to Primitives (1926)
- Swift-Eagle of the Rio Grande (1928)
- Five Little Kachinas (1930)
- Books for Indian Children (1932)
- Pals (1936)
- Two little Hopi (1936)
- Hoppity Bunny's Hop (1939)
- Say the Bells of Old Missions: Legends of Old New Mexico Churches (1943)
- Little-Boy-Dance (1946)
- Toodle's Baby Brother (1946)
- The New Junior Classics : Volume Three; Myths and Legends (1949)
- Family of the Rev. James Wilson of Barnwell County, South Carolina (1958)
- Descendants of John Willis, of will in Richmond County, Virginia, 1715 (1962)
- The Family of Robert Willis of Barnwell County, South Carolina (1962)
- The Ashley Family (1962)
- Military: Brown Family of Virginia and South Carolina (1964)
- Coyote Wisdom (1965) – Part of a collection of stories by Texas Folklore Society
- The Weathersbee Family of Halifax and Martin Counties, North Carolina and Barnwell, South Carolina (1965)
- The Miller Family of North and South Carolina (1967)
- The Bush Family as Descended from John and Mary Bryan Bush of North Carolina (1967)
- The Bush Family as Descended from Richard and Elizabeth Beby Bush of Virginia (1968) – Written with Mary Smith Black
- The Family of Thomas O'Bannon of Fauquier County, Virginia, and Barnwell County, South Carolina (1969)
- Blue-Wings-Flying (1977)
