= José Vicente Aguilar =

Pueblo-American painter (born 1924)

Jose Aguilar
- Sua Peen
- Born: January 8, 1924; San Ildefonso Pueblo, New Mexico, U.S.
- Parent(s): Jose Aguilar; Rosalie Simbola

Aguilar's watercolor painting "Ball Player," 1949

José Vicente Aguilar (also known as Sua Peen (Warm Mountain; born January 8, 1924), is a Pueblo-American painter of San Ildefonso Pueblo and Picurís Pueblo heritage. He is known for his watercolor paintings. Aguilar's art has been exhibited across the United States, particularly in the Southwest; his work is in the permanent collection of institutions including the Gilcrease Museum.

== Early life ==
Aguilar was born in San Ildefonso, New Mexico to José Angela Aguilar (San Ildefonso tribe) and Rosalie Simbola (Picurís tribe). Both of his parents were artists known for their black-on-black pottery, and a number of his siblings also became active in the arts, including his younger brother Alfred Aguilar.

As a child, Aguilar attended a number of schools across the country, including the San Ildefonso Pueblo Day School in New Mexico and the Montezuma Boys' School in Los Altos, California. From 1935 to 1940, he was a student at the Santa Fe Indian School, where he studied under Dorothy Dunn. He then attended Monson High School in Monson, Massachusetts, followed by Hollywood High School in Hollywood, California.

== Career ==
Aguilar spent two years in the United States Army during World War II, serving in the European theater. For his service, he received the Purple Heart.

When he returned, he continued his studies at Otis Art Institute (Los Angeles), the University of New Mexico, Hill and Canyon School of Art, and the Los Angeles Trade Technical Junior College, ending 1951.

Aguilar then worked as a technical artist for the aircraft industry, including at Lockheed Aircraft Corporation, Douglas Aircraft Co., and North American Aviation. During this time, he continued creating fine art and furthering his art education, getting additional schooling at the Los Angeles County Art Institute and the Los Angeles Art Center School.

=== Artistic style ===
Aguilar's early paintings follow the traditional Pueblo style of painting often seen by those educated at the Santa Fe Indian School. As his style matured, he was influenced by artists like Joe Herrera, and Aguilar began to utilize semi-abstract backgrounds and more loosely rendered figures.
