= Garden of the Gods Trading Post =

Historic site in Manitou Springs, Colorado

Coordinates: 38°51′50.2″N 104°53′33.0″W

The Garden of the Gods Trading Post is a historic site in Manitou Springs, Colorado. It is adjacent to the Colorado Springs public park Garden of the Gods.

== History ==
Current facade of Garden of the Gods Trading Post

At the age of 10 years old, in 1900, Charles E. Strausenback began selling figures that he carved from gypsum to visitors to the Garden of the Gods. He went into business for himself about 1917 and operated various stores in and around the park. In 1929 he built a Pueblo-themed trading post at the junction of Beckers Lane and the park boundary where it was reported that, "real Indian curios will be carried, including Indian silver, Navajo blankets, pottery, etc."

Strausenback hired Navajo and Pueblo Indians to work and demonstrate their arts at the trading post, among them were Awa Tsireh (also known as Alfonso Roybal) of San Ildefonso Pueblo, Ca-Ping (also known as Severo Tafoya) of Santa Clara Pueblo, and William Goodluck (frequently called Billy Goodluck) a Navajo, who worked as silversmiths. Silversmiths worked at the business seasonally until about 1955.

Hand tinted photo of Garden of the Gods Trading Post, ca 1930, with Navajo and Pueblo Indians seated on porch

Strausenback died in 1957 and the trading post continued to be run by his widow Esther until 1979. At that time the trading post came under the proprietorship of T.A.T. Enterprises, which still owns the trading post.

The main sales area was 40 feet by 60 feet with living quarters on the second floor, and cost an estimated $10,000 to build in 1929. The current owners have expanded the original sales floor from 2400 sq ft (40 ft x 60 ft) six times to encompass 22,000 sq ft and operates the trading post as a combination Indian art gallery, gift shop, café, conference center and wedding venue. Many of the original features of the 1929 trading post, such as the fireplace, floor and roof beams, have been kept intact preserving Strausenback’s vision of an Indian trading post. It is one of the oldest and largest curio stores in the southwest to be operated continuously from its founding, and has become one of the main attractions in Colorado Springs.

=== Company logo ===
In 1926 Strausenback copyrighted a logo of a Pueblo style thunderbird attacking a rattlesnake patterned after a drawing by Awa Tsireh (Alfonso Roybal) that would become synonymous with the trading post. This logo was painted on the front of the trading post, used on printed matter and business cards and made into silversmith stamps used as shop marks designating where the jewelry was made.

== See also ==
- Garden of the Gods public park
