= Fred Kabotie =

Hopi artist and silversmith (c. 1900–1986)

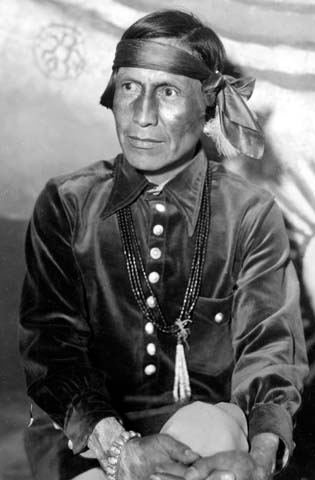
- Hopi Artist Fred Kabotie c. 1932
- Born: Naqavoy'ma c. 1900; Shongopovi, Arizona, US
- Died: February 28, 1986
- Citizenship: Hopi Tribe
- Education: Santa Fe Indian School, Santa Fe Public High School
- Known for: Painting, silversmithing, illustrating
- Awards: Guggenheim Fellowship
- Patrons: Museum of Modern Art, Elizabeth Willis DeHuff, The George Gustav Heye Center, Grand Canyon National Park

Fred Kabotie (c. 1900–1986) was a celebrated Hopi painter, silversmith, illustrator, potter, author, curator and educator. His native name in the Hopi language is Naqavoy'ma, which translates to Day After Day.

== Background and education ==
Fred Kabotie was born into a culturally connected Hopi family at Songo'opavi, Second Mesa, Arizona. His family, along with other Hopi founded Hotevilla, a community faithful to preserving Hopi lifeways. He belonged to the Bluebird Clan, and his father belonged to the Sun Clan. His paternal grandfather gave him the nickname Qaavotay, meaning "tomorrow." His teacher at Toreva Day School spelled his nickname Kabotie, which stuck with him for the rest of his life.

As a child, Kabotie drew images of Hopi katsinam with bits of coal and earth pigments onto rock surfaces near his home.

Kabotie wasn't the best student with his spotty attendance at the local day school. He was eventually forced by the U.S. government to attend Santa Fe Indian School in Santa Fe, New Mexico, where, he says, "I was supposed to discard all my Hopi belief, all my Hopi way of life, and become a white man and become a Christian." English was the only language students were allowed to speak. John DeHuff became superintendent of the school and went against the prevailing government policy of suppressing Native cultures. DeHuff's wife Elizabeth Willis DeHuff taught painting to the students. She encouraged her students to embrace their culture within their paintings. Kabotie painted Katsinas because he missed home, and sold his first painting for 50 cents to the school's carpentry teacher.

DeHuff was demoted and forced to leave the school because of his encouragement of Native cultures. He convinced Kabotie to continue his education at Santa Fe Public High School. During his summer vacations Kabotie worked with artists Velino Shije Herrera (Zia Pueblo) and Alfonso Roybal (San Ildefonso Pueblo) on archaeological excavations for the Museum of New Mexico. He commenced a long association with local archaeologist Edgar Lee Hewett, joining him at archaeological excavations at Jemez Springs, New Mexico, and Gran Quivira.

== Early career and personal life ==
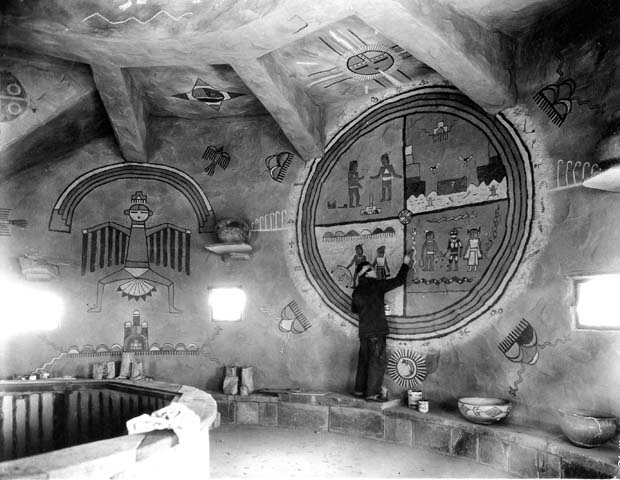
Grand Canyon historic Desert View Watchtower, Fred Kabotie painting interior c. 1932

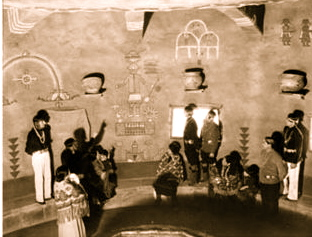
Fred Kabotie murals, Hopi Room, Watchtower, c. 1932

After his graduation in the 1920s, the Museum of New Mexico hired Kabotie to paint and bind books for a salary of $60 per month. Elizabeth DeHuff hired him to illustrate books. The George Gustav Heye Center in New York City commissioned him to paint a series depicting Hopi ceremonies. He also sold works to private collectors. Kabotie primarily painted with watercolor on paper.

In 1930 Kabotie moved back to Shungopavi, Arizona, where he lived for most of his life. He was initiated into the Wuwtsimt men's society and married Alice Talayaonema. They eventually had three children together.

In 1932 Kabotie's work was featured in the American Pavilion at the Venice Biennale, along with the work of Zia Pueblo artist, Ma Pe Wi, and several other Native American artists.

Architect Mary Colter commissioned Kabotie to paint murals in her Desert View Watchtower at the Grand Canyon National Park in 1933. The centerpiece of the wall paintings include a circular motif divided into quadrants depicting the Hopi snake legend. Other paintings in the tower depictions of Muyingwa, the God of Germination; Lalakontu, Women's Secret Society dancers; Pookongahoyas, the Twin War Gods; Baloongahoya, the Little God of Echo, and numerous depictions of celestial phenomena.

In 1937 Oraibi High school opened for Hopi students, and Kabotie taught painting there for 22 years (1937–1959).

He was an advisor at the 1939 Golden Gate International Exposition in San Francisco, California, where he worked with curators Frederic Huntington Douglas and Rene d'Harnoncourt on a show of Native American art.

In 1940 he was commissioned to reproduce the precontact murals at Awatovi Ruins, which were shown at the Museum of Modern Art and other locations in the United States.

== Silversmith work ==
The Museum of Northern Arizona encouraged Kabotie and his cousin Paul Saufkie (1898–1993) to develop a jewelry style unique to Hopi people. They developed an overlay technique, distinct from Zuni and Navajo silversmithing. They created designs inspired by historic Hopi pottery. A friend and benefactor, Leslie Van Ness Denman, commissioned Kabotie's first piece of jewelry as a gift to Eleanor Roosevelt.

Starting in 1947 the Indian Service and GI Bill–funded jewelry classes at the Hopi High School at Oraibi for returning Hopi veterans of World War II. Kabotie taught design and Saufkie taught technique. Each class lasted about eighteen months. The duo created the Hopi Silvercraft Cooperative Guild in 1949 to showcase their students' work. In 1963 the Hopi Guild moved from Oraibi to a newly constructed building at Second Mesa, Arizona, that included a large showroom and workshop space for the artists. Kabotie worked with the Guild in various ways, including serving as president from 1960 until his retirement in 1971. The shop on Second Mesa is rarely used by students today.

== Later career ==
Kabotie and his wife represented the US Department of Agriculture at the World Agricultural Fair in New Delhi, India, in 1960. The high school at Hopi closed, so upon his return from India, Kabotie worked with the Indian Arts and Crafts Board. His many pursuits left him little time to paint after the 1950s.

He had long assisted other tribal members in marketing their artwork. A lifelong dream was accomplished with the founding of the Hopi Cultural Center. In 1971 the center was officially dedicated.

In 1977, the Museum of Northern Arizona published his biography, Fred Kabotie: Hopi Indian Artist, co-authored with Bill Belknap.

== Awards ==
Kabotie received the Guggenheim Fellowship in 1945, which enabled him to study Mimbres pottery and write the book, Designs From the Ancient Mimbreños. He was awarded the Palmes d'Académique from the French government for his contribution to Native American art in 1954.

== Death and legacy ==
Kabotie died on February 28, 1986, after a long illness. "The Hopi believe that when you pass away," he said, "your breath, your soul, becomes into the natural life, into the powers of the deity. Then you will become mingled with all this nature again, such as clouds... That way you will come back to your people..."

He was best known for his painting, and is estimated to have finished 500 paintings.

An archive of his papers, 464 photographic documentation works, and his oral history are located at the Museum of Northern Arizona.

His son Michael Kabotie (1942–2009) was also a well-known artist.

== Collections ==
Kabotie's work is included in the collection of the National Gallery of Art, the Museum of Northern Arizona, the Corcoran Gallery of Art, National Museum of the American Indian, Smithsonian Institution, Museum of New Mexico, Gilcrease Museum, the Heard Museum, Great Plains Art Museum, Fred Jones Jr. Museum of Art, the Newark Museum, the Peabody Museum at Harvard University, and the Philbrook Museum of Art.

== Artwork ==
The fact that Kabotie's Hopi culture was almost taken away from him made him realize his mission in art. His mission was to preserve the Hopi culture. His paintings are seen as realistic, and colorful with dynamic solid strong figures. They reflect his love for his culture and the Hopi people. The Kachinas used in his paintings are seen at Hopi ceremonies.

Kabotie's work was part of Stretching the Canvas: Eight Decades of Native Painting (2019–21), a survey at the National Museum of the American Indian George Gustav Heye Center.

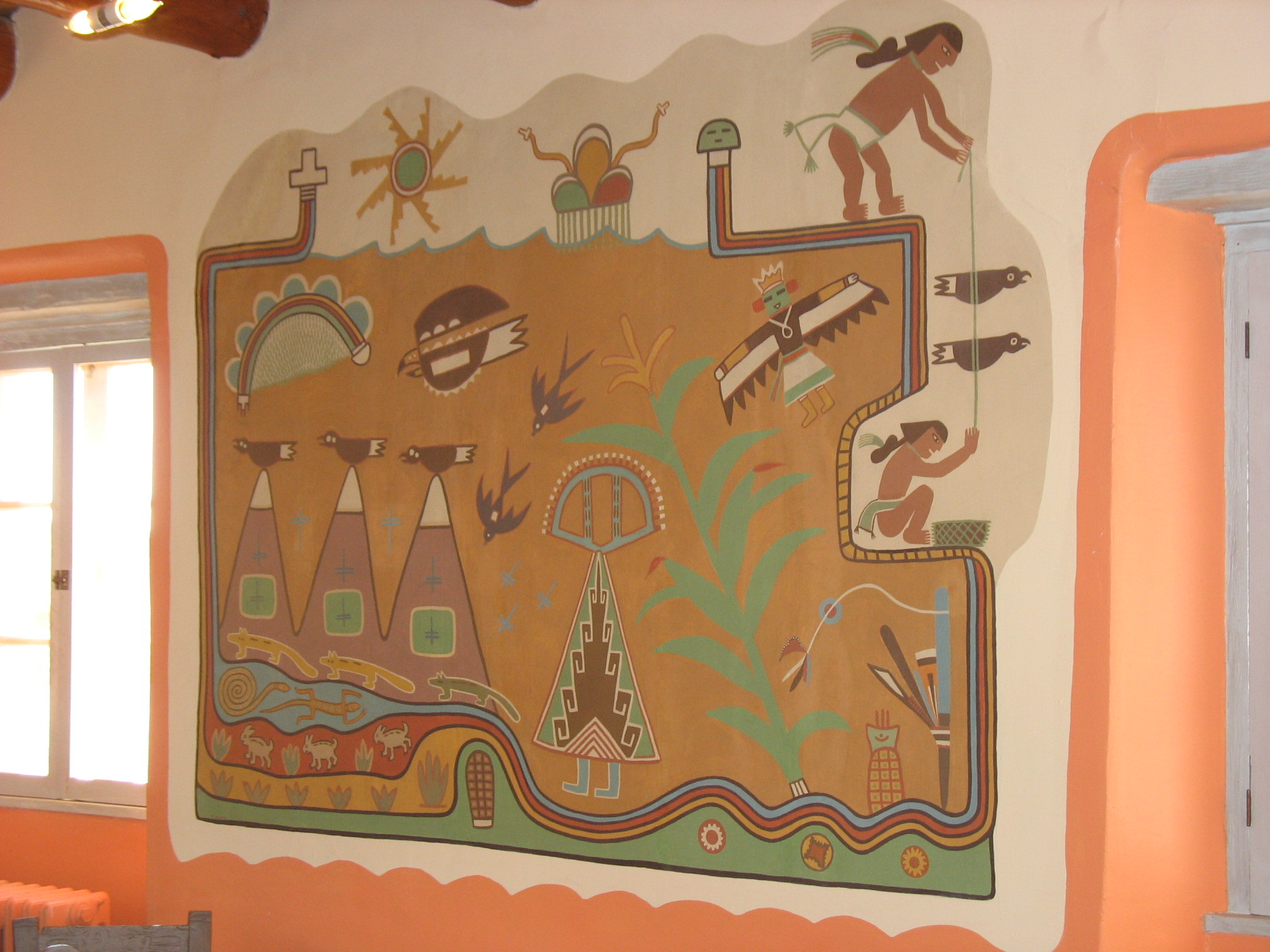
Mural at Petrified Forest

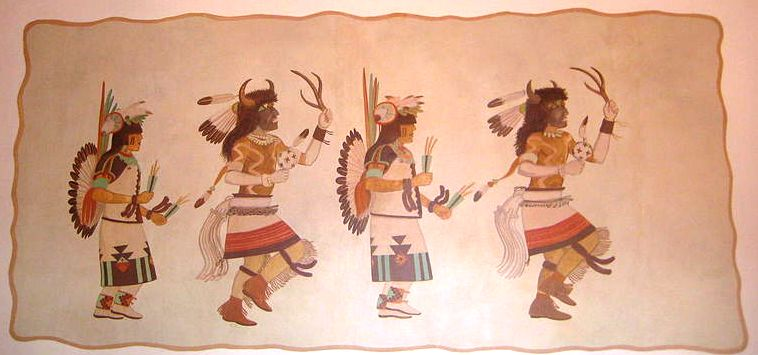
Fred Kabotie's Living Room Painting

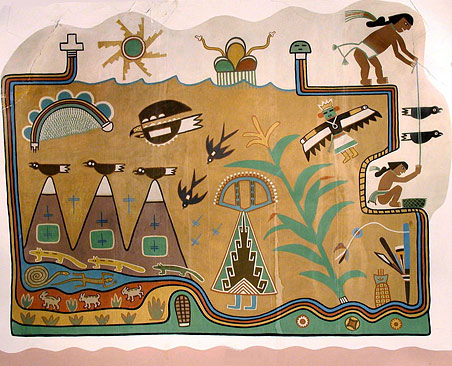
mural within the Painted Desert Inn, commissioned by Mary Jane Colter c. 1947–1948.

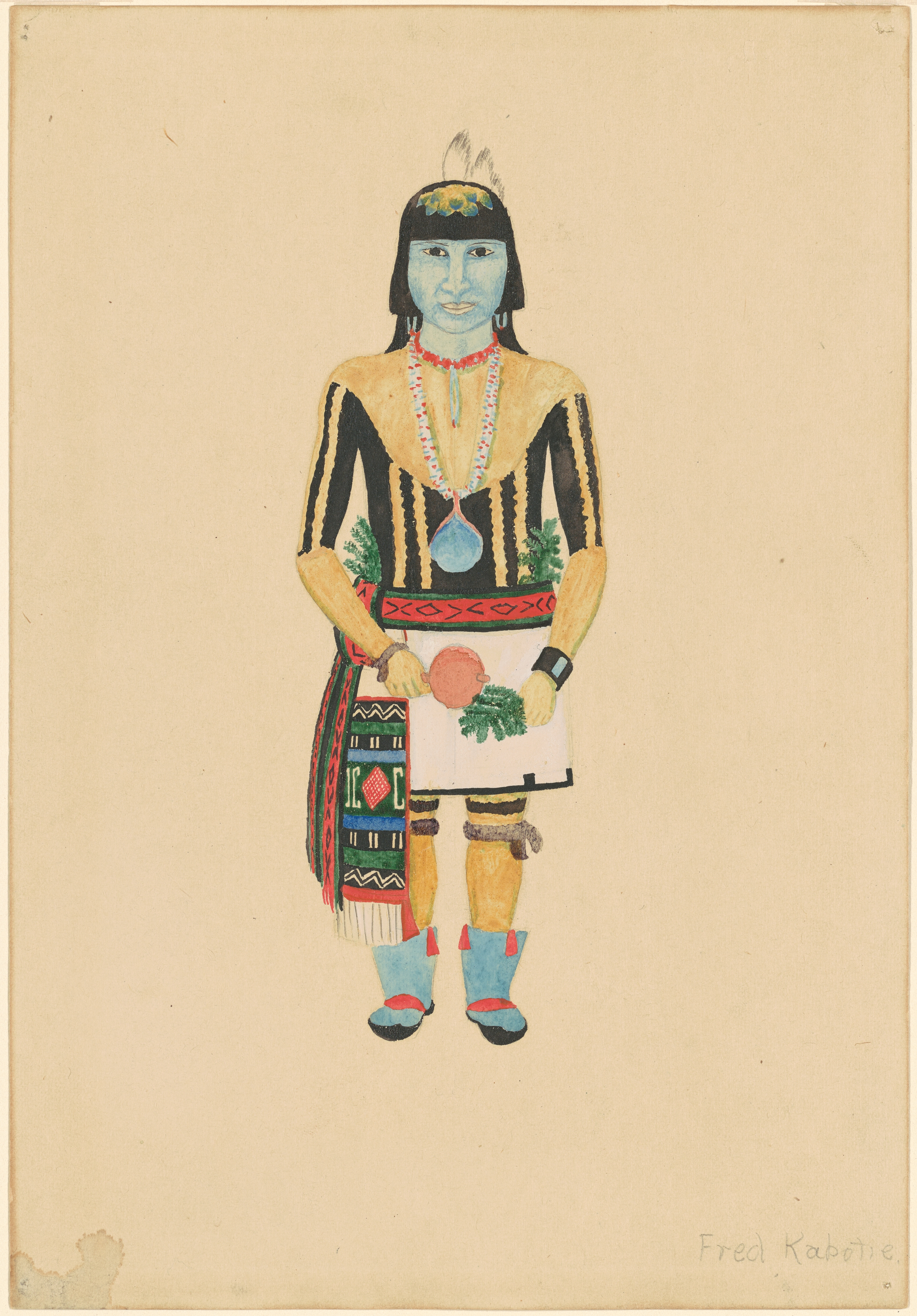
Standing Male Hopi, drawing gouache over graphite on wove paper

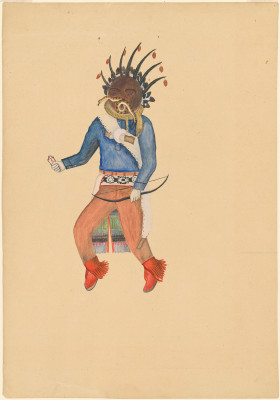
Tasanaiyo (Walpi), A Chief Kachina from First Mesa, drawing, gouache over graphite on wove paper

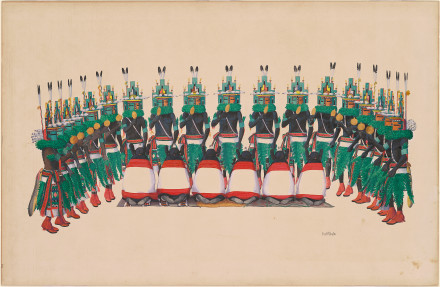
Niman Kachina Dance, drawing, gouache on wove paper laid down to board

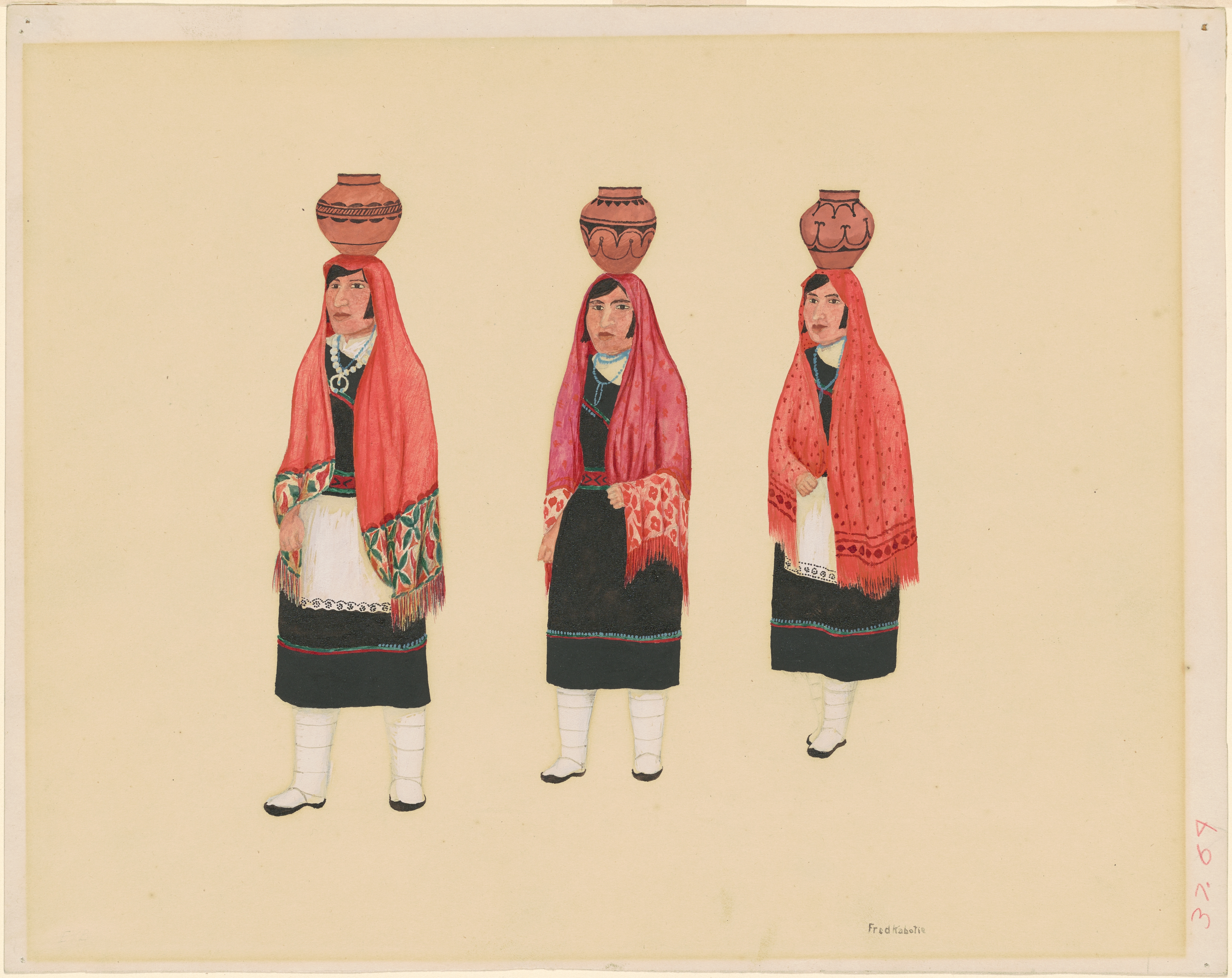
Three Hopi Women Carrying Water Vessels, drawing, gouache and brush and black ink, over graphite on wove paper

== Published works ==
- Kabotie, Fred. Designs from the Ancient Mimbreños With Hopi Interpretation. Flagstaff, AZ: Northland Publishing, 1982. Second Edition. ISBN 978-0-87358-308-4.
- Kabotie, Fred with Bill Belknap. Fred Kabotie: Hopi Indian Artist. Flagstaff, AZ: Museum of Northern Arizona with Northland Press, 1977. ISBN 0-87358-164-4.
- Kabotie, Fred. Hopi Indian Artist. Museum of Northern Arizona, 1977.

== See also ==
- List of Native American artists
- Visual arts by indigenous peoples of the Americas
