= Rosalie Simbola =

Rosalie Simbola Aguilar
- Born: Rosalie Simbola; 1898; New Mexico Territory
- Died: 1946 or 1947 (aged 47 – 49)
- Spouse: José Angela Aguilar

Rosalie Simbola Aguilar (1898 – 1946 or 1947) was a Pueblo-American potter from the Picurís tribe. She is known for her black-on-black pottery and for her creation circa 1931 of a technique in which contrasting carved heights were accentuated with glossy or dull coating. Simbola often collaborated with her husband, José Angela Aguilar, who would carve and paint her creations. By the 1930s her pottery was exhibited nationally along with contemporaries like Rose Gonzales, Maria Martinez, Juanita Pena and Tonita Roybal. Simbola's works are in the permanent collection of institutions including the Denver Museum of Natural History.

Simbola married José Angela Aguilar in 1922 and moved with him to his hometown of San Ildefonso Pueblo. There, she established herself as a prominent potter. A number of the couple's eleven children became potters and painters themselves, including José Vicente Aguilar, Alfred Aguilar, Florence Naranjo and Kathy Trujillo.
