= Amado M. Peña Jr. =

American visual artist and art educator

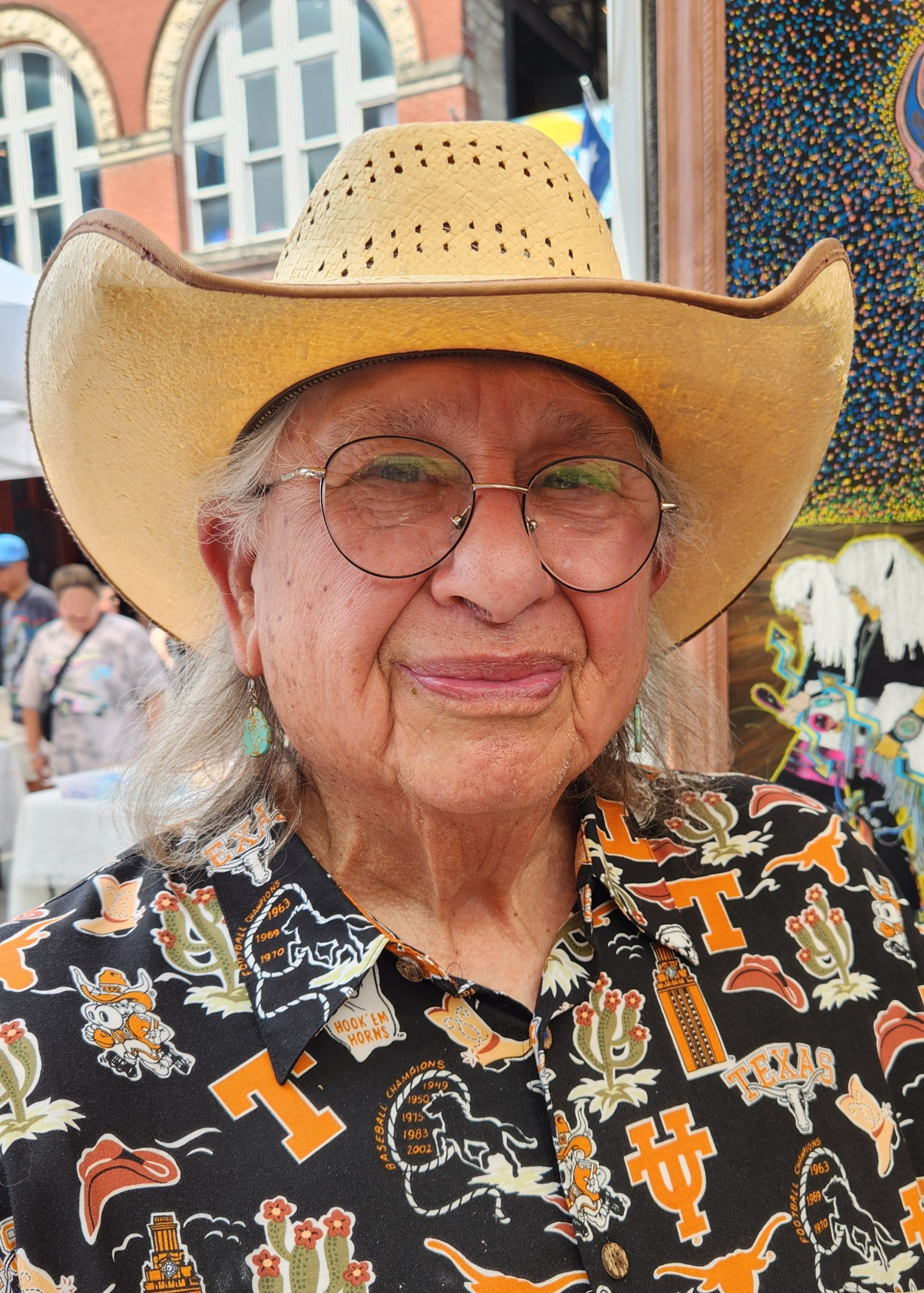
Amado M. Peña Jr. at Pecan Street Festival, Austin 2024

Amado Maurilio Peña Jr. (born 1943) is an American visual artist and art educator of Mexican and Yaqui ancestry. He is known as an important Mexican American artist who emerged from the historical Chicano Movement. He works primarily in printmaking. His artwork was featured in the important exhibition Chicano Art: Resistance and Affirmation.

== Biography ==
Amado M. Peña Jr. was born in the border town of Laredo, Texas, in 1943. He received bachelor's and master's degrees in art and education at Texas A&M University-Kingsville. He has taught art at various Texas schools in Laredo, Crystal City, and Austin. Peña refers to himself as Mestizo due to his mixed Mexican and Yaqui ancestry, a fact that informs his artistic practice. He is a member and recognized as an artisan in the Pascua Yaqui Tribe of Arizona.

== Art ==
Growing up with a working class family in a border town, Amado M. Peña Jr. witnessed firsthand the conditions that led to the Chicano Movement. In the 1970s, Texas-based Chicano artist and educator Mel Casas inspired Peña and others of his generation to create art aimed at documenting Mexican American culture and life. It was at this moment that Peña became involved in the Chicano Movement. He also began to learn more about the indigenous side of his family. Indigenous painter Jose Encarnacion Peña was also a mentor to Amado M. Peña Jr.

Peña was featured in the 1990-1993 exhibition Chicano Art: Resistance and Affirmation that traveled to ten major cities in the United States. The exhibition was the most extensive and widely seen show of Chicano art to date and introduced the artists involved to wider audiences. Peña's art can be seen in the United States Department of States Art in Embassies Collection and the Smithsonian American Art Museum.
