= Jose Encarnacion Peña =

American painter

- Soqween
- Born: Soqween; 1902; San Ildefonso Pueblo, New Mexico, U.S.
- Died: 1979 (aged 76–77)
- Other names: Encarnacion Peña, So Kwa Wi, So Kwa A Weh
- Education: Santa Fe Indian School
- Known for: Painting
- Spouse: Patricia Peña

Jose Encarnacion Peña, also known as Encarnacion Peña, and Soqween (1902–1979) was a Native American painter from San Ildefonso Pueblo in Santa Fe County, New Mexico. He is best known for his watercolors of Pueblo ceremonies and he was an early participant in the San Ildefonso school and later in the "Santa Fe Studio Style" art movement.

== History ==
Peña was born in 1902 in San Ildefonso Pueblo, New Mexico. His Tewa name Soqween (So Kwa Wi, So Kwa A Weh) translates to "Frost on the Mountain". His aunt was potter Maria Martinez. In the 1920s he was painting in the San Ildefonso Pueblo alongside many of the other early San Ildefonso school artists. In the early 1930s, Pena studied with painting with Dorothy Dunn at "The Studio" of the Santa Fe Indian School.

His artwork was exhibited widely including at the Riverside Museum (1969) in New York City; Renaissance Society (1958) in Chicago; Santa Fe Indian Market (1959, winning first place for painting at the Fiesta Indian Market), and many others.

Peña work is included in public museum collections including the Museum of Fine Arts, Houston, Denver Art Museum, Cleveland Museum of Art, National Anthropological Archives, Smithsonian's National Museum of the American Indian, among others.

He was married to Patricia Peña, a doll maker. He was a mentor and influential to artist Amado Maurilio Peña Jr (born 1943).
