= Martina Vigil Montoya =

Pueblo ceramics painter

Martina Vigil Montoya (1856–1916) was a ceramics painter from San Ildefonso Pueblo, New Mexico. She frequently collaborated with her husband and partner Florentino Montoya. They introduced new techniques and materials to other potters. Julian Martinez often copied their designs and in 1895 Maria Martinez called Martina the finest contemporary potter. They moved from San Ildefonso to Cochiti Pueblo, the birthplace of Martina's father, between 1902 and 1905. While the bentonite slip employed in Cochiti pottery gave it a soapy appearance, Southwestern ceramics expert Jonathan Batkin considers the Montoyas' work from this period to be stylistically San Ildefonso. She's known for being the primary instructor of her niece Tonita Peña.
