= Buffalo dance =

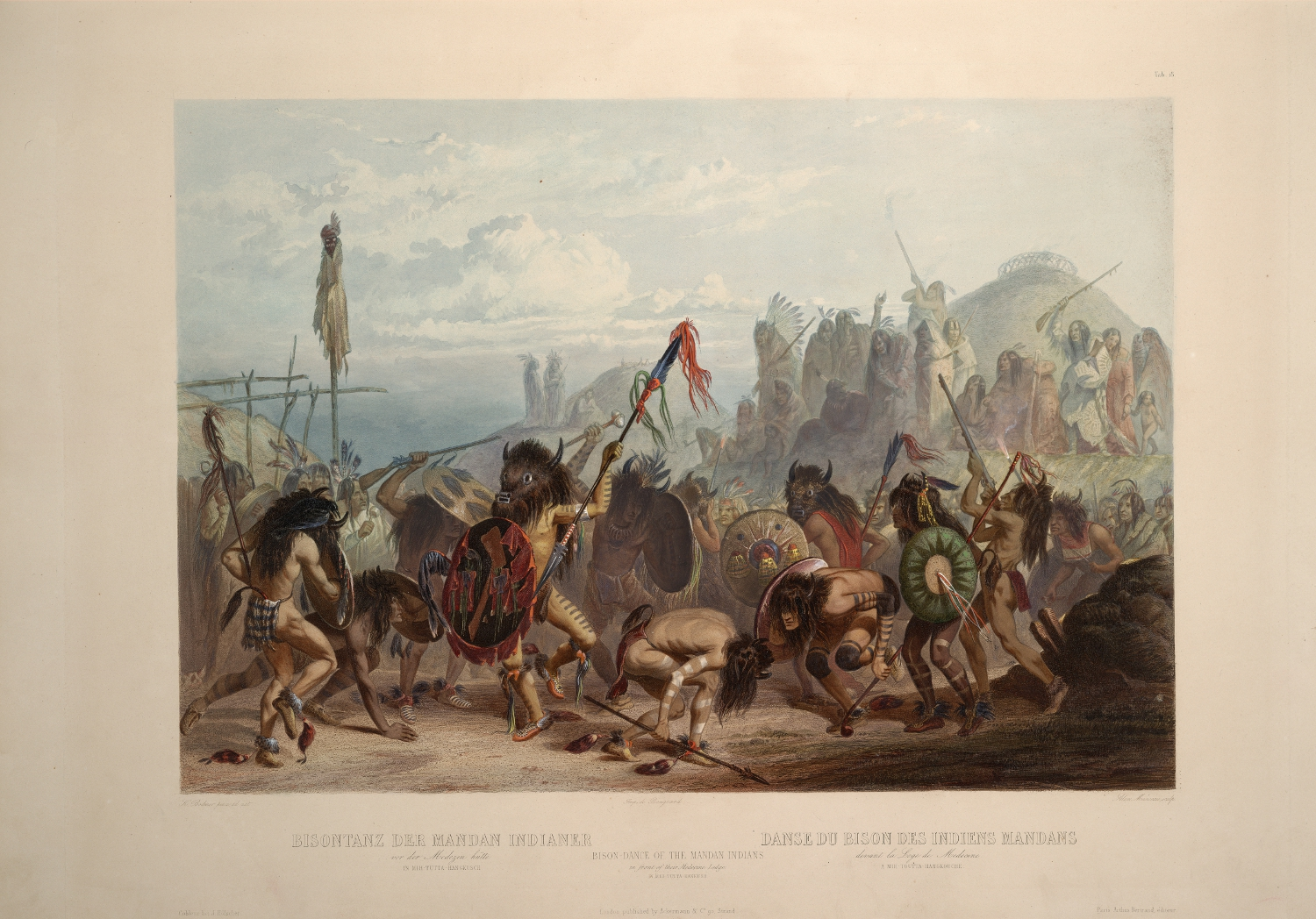
"Bison-Dance of the Mandan Natives in front of their Medecine Lodge in Mih-Tutta-Hankush": aquatint by Karl Bodmer from the book Maximilian, Prince of Wied's Travels in the Interior of North America, during the years 1832–1834

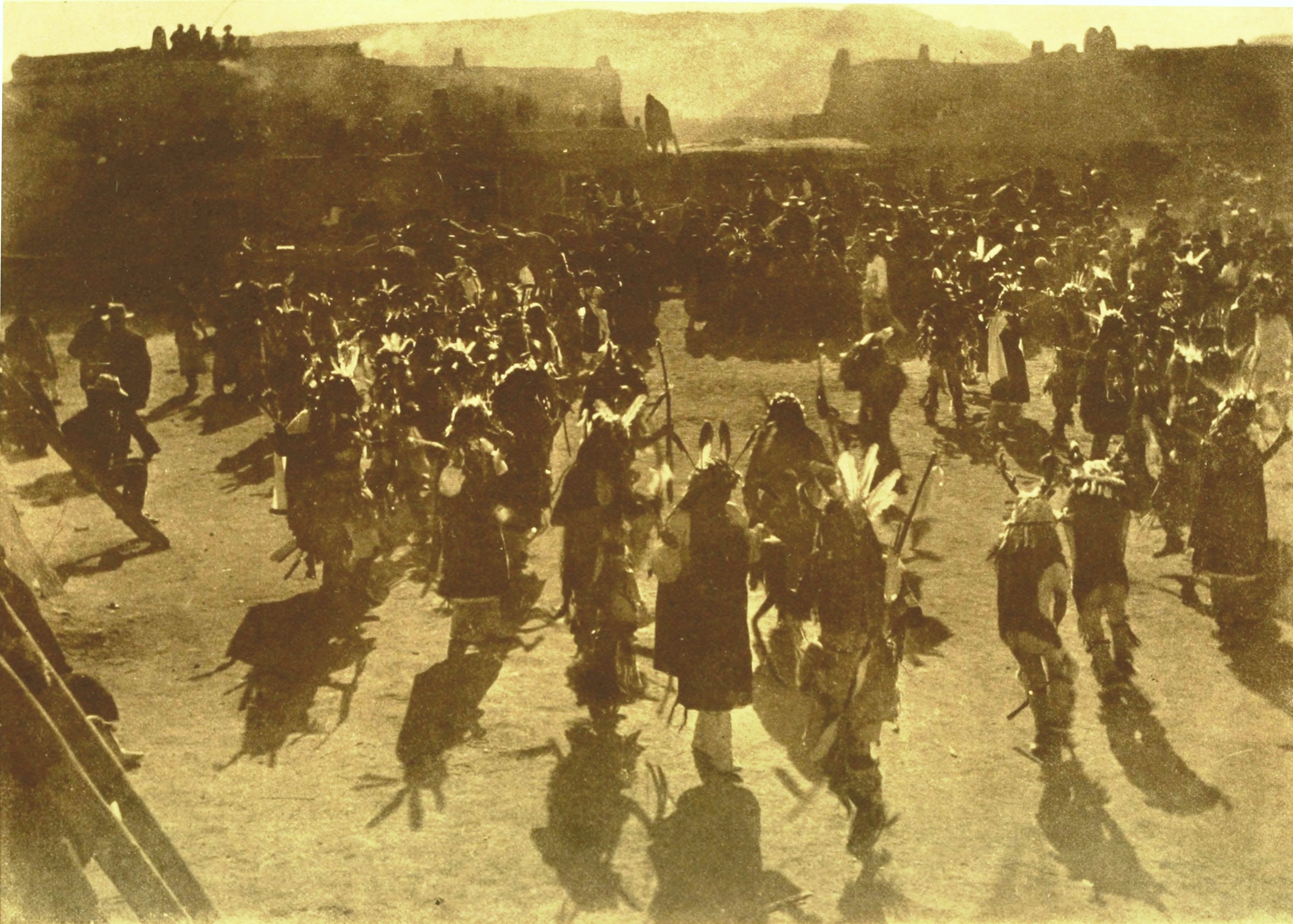
1893 photo of a Buffalo Dance at San Ildefonso Pueblo, New Mexico in 1893 by Edwin Deming

The Buffalo Dance, or Bison Dance, is an annual dance festival of many North American Plains Natives, including the Mandan, Sioux, Cheyenne, Pawnee, and Omaha, among others. The festival traditionally coincided with the return of the buffalo herds, and included a feast and a dance with a number of men wearing buffalo and other animal skins.

As the buffalo, or bison, was so central to society, it was important to assure the return of the herd and an abundance of food and resources.

A short, 16-second, black-and-white silent 1894 film Buffalo Dance shows people performing the dance. It is notable for being one of the earliest films made featuring Native Americans.

The Buffalo Dance can also refer to section of larger ceremonies and dances, such as the Sun Dance. In some societies it was also a dance more associated with curing the ill, calling on the spirit of the buffalo.
