= Alfred Aguilar =

American painter

- Sa Wa Pin
- Born: 1933 (age 92–93); San Ildefonso Pueblo, New Mexico

Alfred Aguilar (born 1933), also called Sa Wa Pin, is Tewa Pueblo-American potter, ceramicist, and painter from the San Ildefonso Pueblo tribe. He is known for his coil-built pottery that is carved or painted, his buffalo figurines, and his clay nacimientos.

He has used the moniker Aguilar Indian Arts in Santa Fe, New Mexico as a signifier of his work.

He has been a teacher's aide and classroom instructor at the San Ildefonso pueblo and operates a store on the pueblo.

Aguilar is the son of artists José Angela Aguilar and Rosalie Simbola, both potters. His brother José Vicente Aguilar was a painter as well.

== Collections ==
Aguilar's work is held in the permanent collections of the Gorman Museum of Native American Art, the National Museum of the American Indian of the Smithsonian Institution, the University of Dayton, among others.
