= Josefa Roybal =

Native American artist

- Born: San Ildefonso Pueblo, New Mexico
- Other name: Josephine Roybal
- Citizenship: Native American
- Occupations: Painter and potter

Josefa Roybal (dates unknown) sometimes known as Josephine or Josepha, was a 20th-century Native American artist, a San Ildefonso Pueblo painter and potter. According to one source, she "most likely was born between 1900 and 1905 and most likely died before 1960."

== Life ==
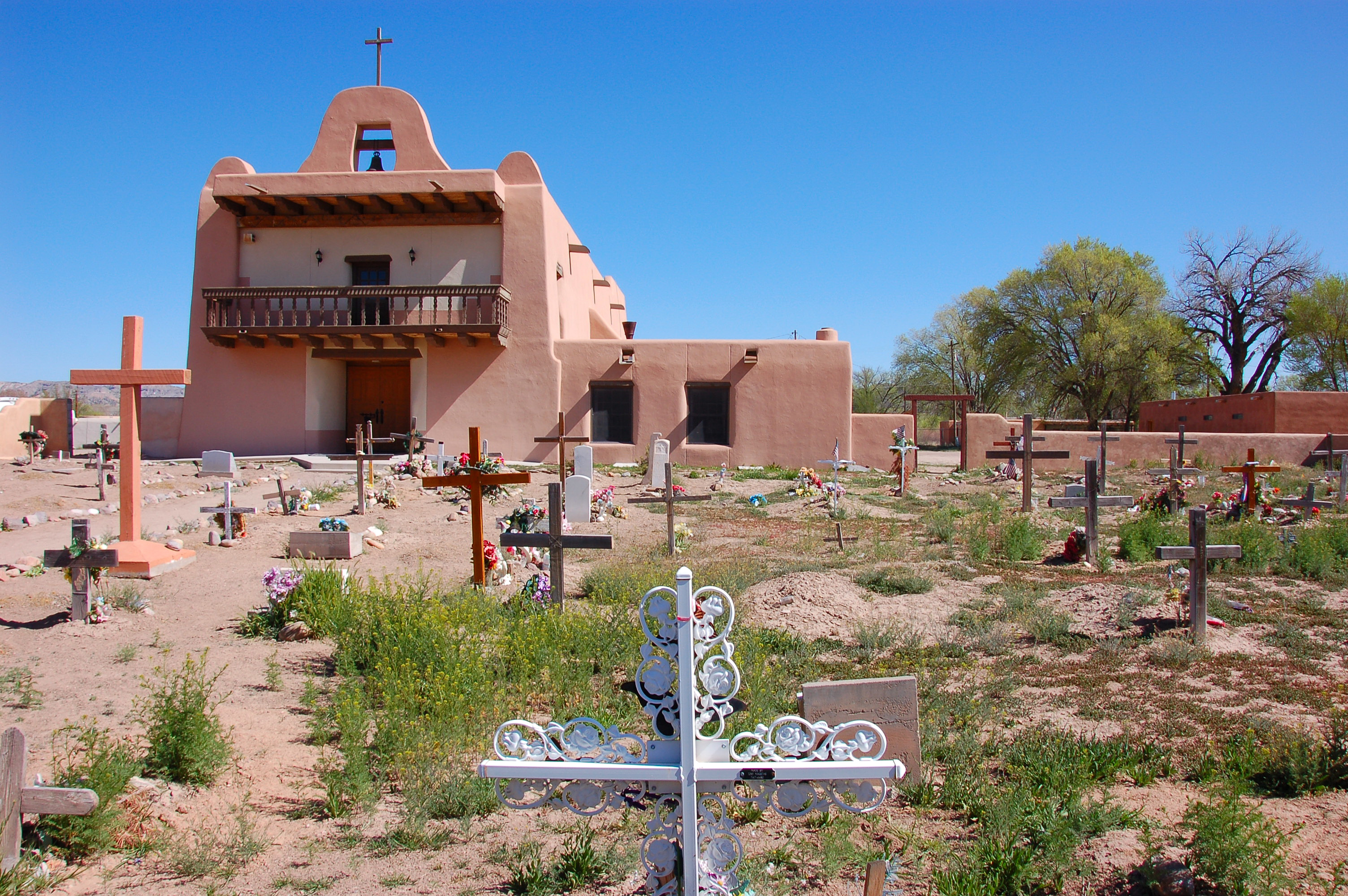
Church and cemetery at San Ildefonso Pueblo, New Mexico

Roybal was born in northern New Mexico into a family of Native American artists, notably including the artist Awa Tsireh (also known as Alfonso Roybal). According to Adobe Gallery (which cites the work of Gregory Schaaf), Josefa was the daughter of Alfonsita Martinez and Juan Esteban Roybal; sister of Awa Tsireh (1898–1955), Santana Roybal Martinez (1909–2002), Lupita Roybal, Manuelita Johnson Roybal and painter Raphael Roybal. Her father was the nephew of potter Cresencio Martinez. Her nephew, José Disiderio (J.D.) Roybal, also became a noted painter. Her "maternal grandfather, was a full-blooded Diné of the Navajo Nation, who had been adopted as an infant into the pueblo."

Josefa was "one of the few female Pueblo painters in the first years of the movement" but she did not receive the attention lavished on her brother because the artistic community at that time was dominated by male artists. (Since then, more attention has been paid to the female artists of San Ildefonso Pueblo.)

She sometimes signed her work with an Anglicized version of her name, Josephine, as a convenience for non-Navajo speakers. Her work can be found using both names.

One of her paintings, Comanche Dancers, (c. 1930–1939), watercolor, ink, and pencil on paper, resides in the collection of the Smithsonian American Art Museum.
