= Lyle E. Bennett =

American architect

Lyle E. Bennett was an architect with the National Park Service.

A number of his works have been listed on the National Register of Historic Places. They include:

- One or more works in Bandelier CCC Historic District, off NM 4 in Bandelier National Monument, New Mexico
- Painted Desert Inn, off US 40 in Petrified Forest National Park, Arizona
- One or more works in White Sands National Monument Historic District, US 70/82, Alamogordo, New Mexico
