= José Angela Aguilar =

American painter

- Sah Pah
- Born: 1898; New Mexico Territory
- Died: 1965 (aged 66–67)
- Spouse: Rosalie Simbola (m. 1922)
- Children: Jose and Alfred

José Angela “Joe” Aguilar (also known as Sah Pah; 1898 – 1965) was a Pueblo-American painter and potter from the San Ildefonso Pueblo tribe. In addition to painting two-dimensional artworks, he also frequently painted the pots made by his wife Rosalie Simbola and his mother Susana Aguilar. His artwork is in the permanent collection of institutions including the Hearst Museum of Anthropology and the Museum of the American Indian.

Aguilar married Rosie Simbola (from the Picurís tribe) in 1922. A number of their children went on to be notable artists as well, including sons José and Alfred Aguilar.
