= San Ildefonso school =

Native American art movement (1900-35)

- Years active: 1900–1935
- Location: San Ildefonso Pueblo, United States
- Major figures: Tonita Peña, Julian Martinez, Awa Tsireh, Abel Sanchez, Crecencio Martinez, Encarnación Peña

The San Ildefonso school, also known as San Ildefonso Self-Taught Group, was an art movement from 1900 to 1935 featuring Native American artists primarily from the San Ildefonso Pueblo in New Mexico. The group consisted of Tonita Peña, Julian Martinez, Awa Tsireh, Crecencio Martinez, and Jose Encarnación Peña. This was the first known Native American group in the American Southwest to practice easel painting.

== History ==
The San Ildefonso school was an art movement from 1900 until 1935, and 1917 was a key year in the production of artwork by the San Ildefonso school according to many art historians including W. Jackson Rushing. The artwork during this movement was created utilizing traditional aspects of Native culture but created specifically for a non-Native patronage. It was not until the 1920s these artists were able to sell their work. The first artist from the San Ildefonso school to become well known was Tonita Peña.

Beginning in 1900, Esther Hoyt, a non-Native teacher at the San Ildefonso Day School, taught Native students painting on easels and encouraged the students to "paint as they wished". At the time it was against government policy to allow Native students to paint what they wanted, the school was operated by the Bureau of Indian Affairs. Students were given materials by Hoyt and encouraged to sketch their life experiences. Hoyt, provided young Tonita Peña with watercolors when she was a student there. Other students at the San Ildefonso Day School included Crecencio Martinez, Awa Tsireh (Alfonso Roybal), Tonita Peña, Romando Vigil, Alfredo Montoya, Santana Roybal, and Abel Sanchez (Oqwa Pi). After Hoyt left the school, Elizabeth Richards continued to teach painting to elementary school students. Despite being enrolled in classes, these students have been referred to as "self-taught".

Edgar Lee Hewett, a professor of archaeology and the director of the Laboratory of Anthropology in Santa Fe, was working closely with locals from the San Ildefonso Pueblo on excavations between 1907 and 1908. He said that he "discovered" their ability to draw and paint in watercolor. Hewett encouraged the production of art work from Native American artists and helped gain them financial support of white patrons.

== Artwork ==
Mostly works on paper, the paintings focused on human figures and portrayed Pueblo dances, koshares, ceremonies, and genre scenes of daily life. Backgrounds were minimal or absent. The artists used blacks and whites and bright, flat colors. They added stylized motifs used in other Pueblo artist expressions, such as ceramics, mural painting, and embroidery. The artists used watercolors, and distemper and casein, a milk-based paint.

== Critics ==
During the early 20th century, numerous white Americans became involved in an effort to promote Native American arts within white social circles. Critiques of the San Ildefonso school have been made by those who study "traditional" Native American art, versus art of Native Americans supported (and perhaps shaped by) white patronage.

== San Ildefonso school artists ==
- Crecencio Martinez
- Julian Martinez
- Alfredo Montoya
- Jose Encarnacion Peña
- Tonita Peña
- Santana Roybal
- Abel Sanchez
- Awa Tsireh
- Romando Vigil
