= Painted Desert Inn =

- U.S. National Register of Historic Places
- U.S. National Historic Landmark
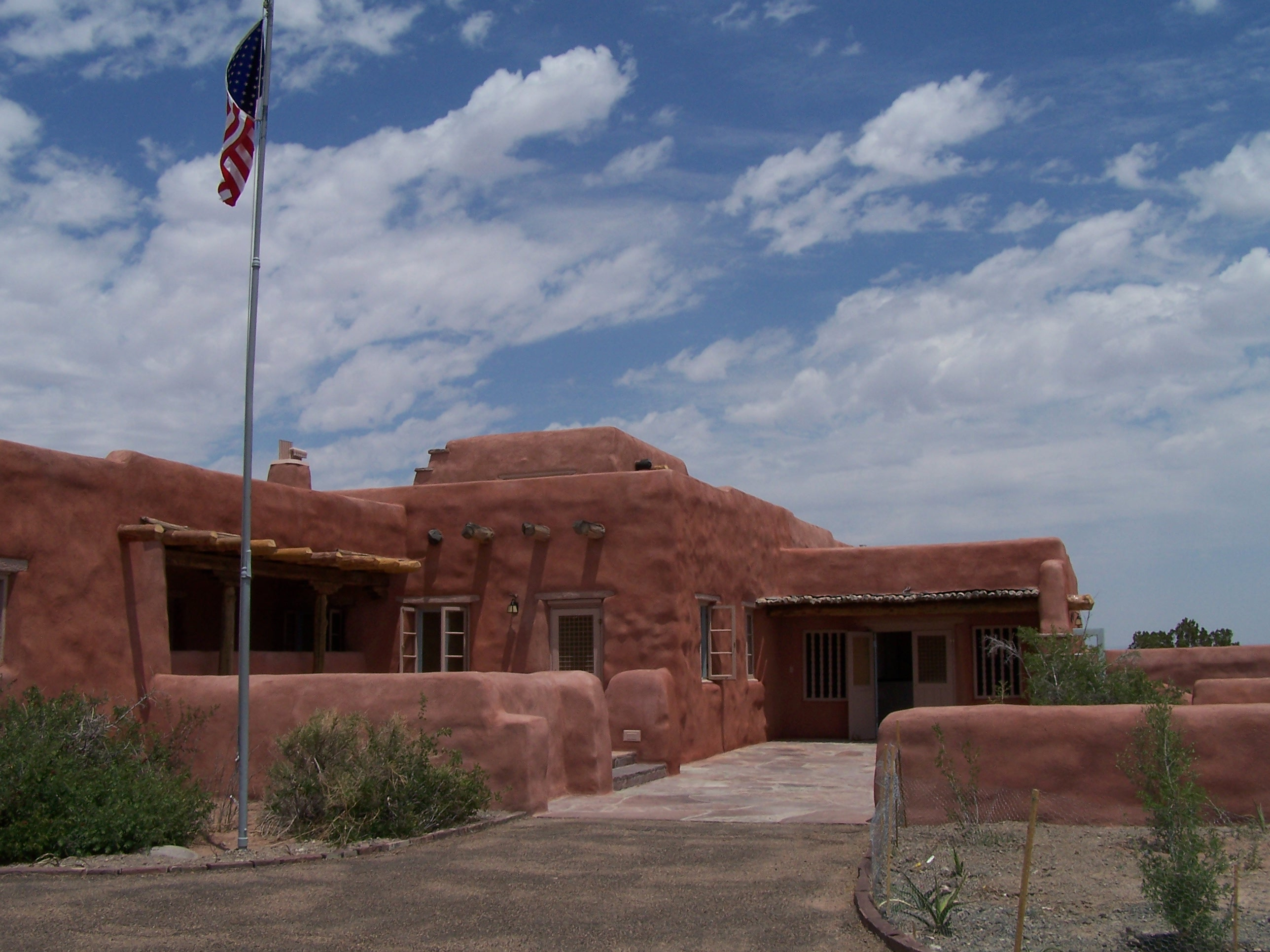
- Painted Desert Inn, 2006

- Location within Arizona Location within the United States
- Location: Petrified Forest National Park, Arizona
- Coordinates: 35°5′2.32″N 109°47′17.17″W
- Built: 1937
- Architect: Lyle E. Bennett; Mary Jane Colter
- Architectural style: Pueblo Revival
- NRHP reference No.: 87001421

Significant dates
- Added to NRHP: May 28, 1987
- Designated NHL: May 28, 1987

Painted Desert Inn is a historic complex in Petrified Forest National Park, in Apache County, eastern Arizona. It is located off Interstate 40 and near the original alignment of historic U.S. Route 66, overlooking the Painted Desert.

== History ==
The inn's main building and associated guest cabins−casitas were designed in the Pueblo Revival style, by National Park Service architect Lyle E. Bennett and others from the Park Service Branch of Plans and Design. Construction was carried out by Civilian Conservation Corps builders and artisans over 1937–1940. A portion of the main building was remodeled from the 1920s inn on the site, nicknamed the Stone Tree House due to local petrified wood used in its architectural elements.

After post-war design revisions by architect and interior designer Mary Jane Colter, it was operated by the Fred Harvey Company as a Harvey House from 1947 to 1963, when it closed. Demolition was proposed in the mid-1970s, but after public protests the building was reopened for limited use in 1976 as a Bicentennial Travel Center after being listed on the National Register of Historic Places. It was declared a National Historic Landmark in 1987 for its architecture and the distinctive way in which New Deal works funding was used for its construction.

The main building of the Painted Desert Inn was extensively rehabilitated and restored over the years, reopening as a museum and bookstore in the 1990s full time. There was an extensive period of rehabilitation for the complex 2004–2006, reopening as a museum (the park's bookstores are now at the Rainbow Forest Museum and Painted Desert Visitor Center). Overnight accommodations have not been offered since 1947, but a nostalgic ice cream parlor is open during the summer months.

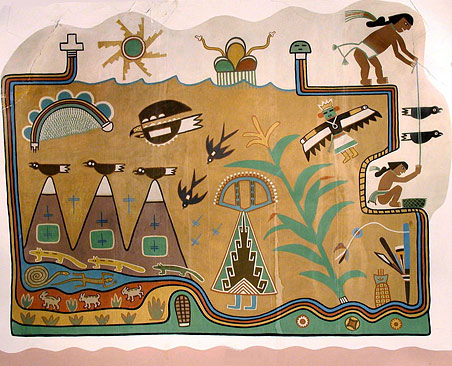
Mural by Hopi Artist Fred Kabotie (painted c. 1948), commissioned by Mary Jane Colter.

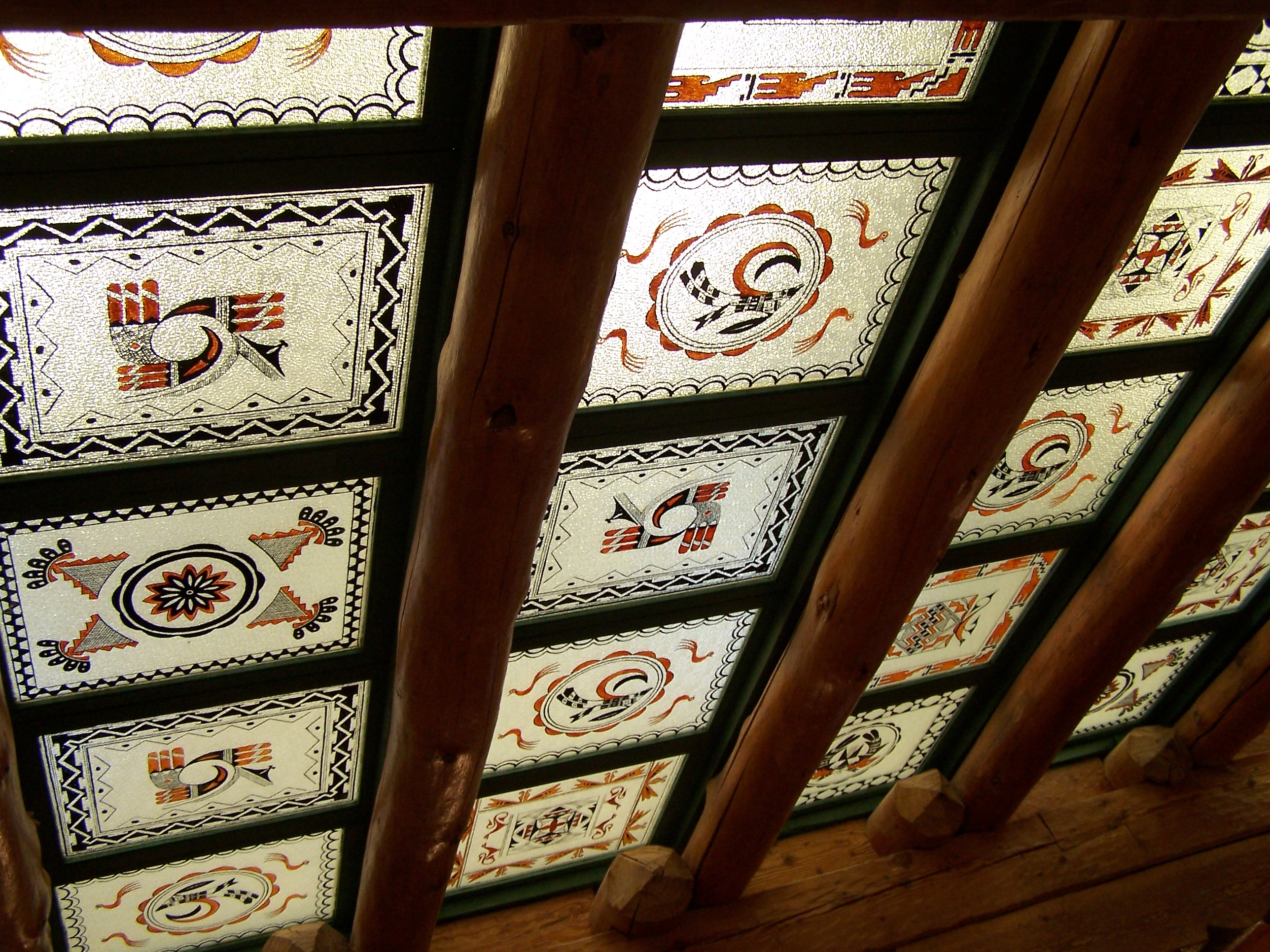
Skylights in the Painted Desert Inn, painted by the Civilian Conservation Corps.

== Murals ==
Hopi artist Fred Kabotie was engaged by Colter to paint the inn's murals in 1947–48. Colter knew Kabotie from a previous collaboration at the Fred Harvey Hopi House in Grand Canyon National Park. Kabotie's work depicts aspects of Hopi life, including a journey through the Painted Desert to collect salt.

== See also ==
- National Register of Historic Places listings in Apache County, Arizona
- National Register of Historic Places listings in Petrified Forest National Park
