= Joe Herrera =

American Pueblo painter (1921–2001)

Joe Hilario Herrera
- See-Ru
- Born: May 17, 1921; Cochiti, New Mexico, U.S.
- Died: September 26, 2001 (aged 78); Santa Fe, New Mexico, U.S.
- Burial place: Santa Fe National Cemetery
- Other name: Blue Bird
- Education: Santa Fe Indian School, University of New Mexico
- Occupations: painter, teacher, politician, radio newscaster, Pueblo activist
- Mother: Tonita Peña
- Awards: Ordre des Palmes Académiques (1954)

Joe Hilario Herrera (also known as See-Ru; 1921 – 2001), was an American Pueblo painter, teacher, radio newscaster, politician, and a Pueblo activist; from a mixed Cochiti and San Ildefonso background. He was the son of the artist Tonita Peña, and had trained at the Santa Fe Indian School.

== Early life and education ==
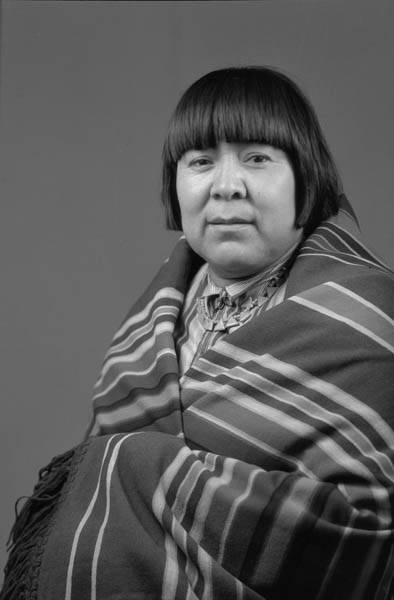
Herrera's mother Tonita Peña

Joe Hilario Herrera was born on May 17, 1921, in Cochiti, New Mexico. His father Felipe Herrera, was from Cochiti, where he grew up. While his mother, Tonita Peña was from San Ildefonso. Herrera inherited rich artistic traditions from both of his parents. His early interest in painting was stimulated by watching his mother's husband, Julian Martinez paint, but above all through the strong influence of his mother, who was the most prominent Native American female painter of her generation. Herrera swatted flies away from his mother's paint dishes while she worked, and in return she gave him paint with which he began to experiment at the age of five.

Like many other Pueblo artists from the Southwest at the time, Herrera trained at the Studio School at the Santa Fe Indian School, which had been founded by Dorothy Dunn, but was by this time directed by the Ohkay Owingeh artist Geronima Montoya. His early art was in the flat watercolor style, typical of the School's output.

From 1941 to 1945, served in the United States Army during World War II and was stationed in the Caribbean. He also worked at the Laboratory of Anthropology. He completed a bachelor's degree in art education at the University of New Mexico, on the G.I. Bill.

== Teaching ==
After graduation he taught art classes in the Albuquerque Public Schools, and later taught for the United States Department of Education at Indian Schools across the state of New Mexico. His work had influenced painter Helen Hardin, who had served as one of his students.

== Art work ==
Influenced by his mother's art style and by the style of the Studio School, Herrera initially produced paintings of Pueblo dancers in flat, opaque watercolors. Like many other artists from the school, including his mother, Herrera worked painting murals, which was a popular form of patronage for Native art in the 1930s and 1940s.

However, he was one of the first Studio School-trained Native American artists to move away from representational art into more abstract expression. The artist Raymond Johnson was an influential figure in this shift after Herrera studied under him at the University of New Mexico between 1950 and 1953. In the 1950s, Herrera gained international recognition after an exhibition at the Museum of Modern Art (MoMA).

In 1954, the French government honored Herrera with the Ordre des Palmes Académiques (English: Order of Academic Palms) award.

Of his own work, Herrera said:

Klee sought to see the wonders of nature through the eyes of aborigines and children, and attempted to combine their freshness of vision with his own cultivated knowledge, [while] I attempted the reverse, bringing the innovations and intellectual constructs of modern art to bear on traditional Pueblo imagery.

— Joe Herrera, unpublished interview, on file at the Native American Artists Resource Collection, Heard Museum (see Berlo and Phillips, p. 223)

Herrera's work has been described as "coolly decorative", in contrast with his mother's "warmly natural" art. His synthesis of traditional Pueblo art, Studio School training, and engagement with modernism and abstract styles was influential on an entire generation of artists.

== Politics, civil service, and late paintings ==
From 1953 to 1967, Herrera served as secretary on the All Indian Pueblo Council, before they had an office. He was also a member of the National Congress of American Indians. He testified before the United States Congress in Washington, D.C., in support of legislation for Native American economic development. In 1968, Herrera was hired to lead a New Mexico State Employment Commission and help Native Americans find jobs.

For seven years he worked as a newscaster at KTRC radio station in Santa Fe.

After retiring from his public service work in 1983, he returned to painting. By the early 1990s, his eyesight was poor and he stopped painting.

== Death and legacy ==
Herrera died on September 26, 2001, from diabetes complications in Santa Fe, New Mexico. His funeral service was at Cathedral Basilica of St. Francis of Assisi, and he is buried in Santa Fe National Cemetery.

Herrera's work can be found in many public museum collections including the Fred Jones Jr. Museum of Art at the University of Oklahoma; the Detroit Institute of Arts; the Gilcrease Museum; the Indianapolis Museum of Art; the National Museum of the American Indian; the Museum of Northern Arizona; among others.

In 2018, his art was featured alongside his mother's in the exhibition "Generations in Modern Pueblo Painting: The Art of Tonita Peña and Joe Herrera" (2018) at the Fred Jones Jr. Museum of Art at the University of Oklahoma. The exhibit highlighted the seminal influence both artists had on subsequent generations of painters and how both mother and son forged new paths which grew out of but also broke from tradition. It was the first significant exhibition of Peña's work since the 1930s, and the premiere of many of Herrera's later works. Curator W. Jackson Rushing III said of the exhibition, "It is my contention that Peña and Herrera were key figures in the development of modern art in the United States and that there is no satisfying explanation for their exclusion from surveys on the subject. On the contrary, for several reasons, a critical examination of their aesthetic achievements and legacy reshapes our understanding of American modernism."

Herrera's work was part of Stretching the Canvas: Eight Decades of Native Painting (2019–2021), a survey at the National Museum of the American Indian, and George Gustav Heye Center.

== See also ==
- Oasisamerica
- List of Native American artists
- Visual arts by indigenous peoples of the Americas
- Modernism
