= Oqwa Pi =

American painter

- Born: 1899; San Ildefonso Pueblo, New Mexico, U.S.
- Died: 1971 (aged 71–72); Los Alamos, New Mexico, U.S.
- Other names: Abel Sanchez, Red Cloud, Ogwa-Pi, Oqua Pi, Aqua Pi, Kachina Stick
- Occupations: painter, muralist, politician

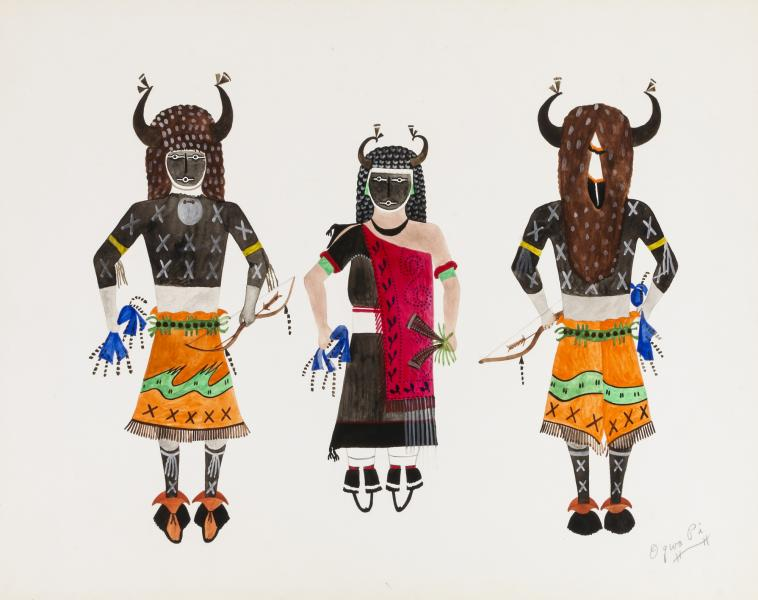
Buffalo Dancers, c.1920–1925. Watercolor and pencil on paperboard. Collection of the Smithsonian Institution

Oqwa Pi (from Tewa Okhúwá Pʼîˀ, lit. 'red cloud'), also known as Kachina Stick and Abel Sanchez (1899–1971), was a San Ildefonso Pueblo painter, muralist, and politician. Pi was known for his brightly colored paintings. He served as governor of the San Ildefonso Pueblo for six terms.

== Biography ==
Oqwa Pi was born in 1899 in San Ildefonso Pueblo (Tewa: Pʼohwhogeh Ówîngeh) in New Mexico. He was educated at the Santa Fe Indian School, where he learned watercolor and mural paintings; he studied with Dorothy Dunn. The Indian School later commissioned him to create murals at the school. He then returned to the pueblo where he married and had a number of children.

In 1931, the Exhibition of Indian Tribal Arts at the Grand Central Galleries in New York City happened, and as a result, Pi's work toured and was shown nationally including at the Museum of Modern Art. He attended the Santa Fe Indian School, studying under Dorothy Dunn. Pi has a mural at the Santa Fe Indian School, in the dining room.

Oqwa Pi's paintings were executed in one of the two specific styles that are associated with the San Ildefonso school, a Native art movement of self-taught artists from 1900 to 1935. His subjects include festivals, dances and native ceremonies. Regarding his paintings of Native ceremonial dances, his son Gilbert, also a painter, stated that Oqwa Pi painted spiritual, but not secretive dances that "didn't exploit their spirituality in a senseless way".

Pi also was a politician, having served serving six terms as governor of San Ildefonso Pueblo.

Later in life, Pi and his wife move to Santa Fe, New Mexico to live. Pi died in 1971 in Los Alamos, New Mexico. Two of his sons became painters, Gilbert Sánchez, and Ramos Sánchez (born 1926). His grandson, Russell Sánchez is a painter and potter.

== Collections ==
His work is included in museum collections including at the Smithsonian American Art Museum, Detroit Institute of Arts, Museum of Fine Arts, Houston, Brooklyn Museum, Ackland Art Museum, and Denver Art Museum.

== See also ==
- List of Native American artists
- Julian Martinez
