= Awa Tsireh =

American painter

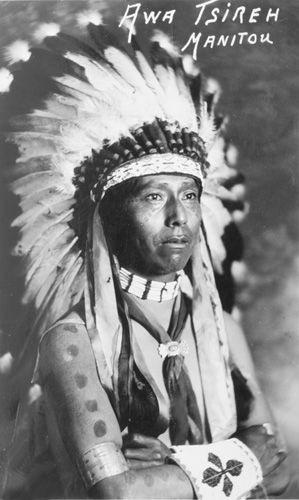
- Photo postcard of Awa Tsireh in Plains Indian attire, ca 1930s, at Manitou, Colorado.
- Born: Alfonso Roybal, Cattail Bird; February 1, 1898; San Ildefonso Pueblo
- Died: March 30, 1955 (aged 57); San Ildefonso Pueblo
- Known for: Painting, Metalwork
- Movement: San Ildefonso Self-Taught Group
- Awards: Ordre des Palmes Académiques, 1954
- Patrons: Edgar Lee Hewett, Alice Corbin

"Eagle with Snake", circa 1927. This painting was in the collection of William and Alice Corbin Henderson. The artist's access to the Hendersons' art books may have influenced this and other of his works.

Awa Tsireh (February 1, 1898 – March 30, 1955), also known as Alfonso Roybal and Cattail Bird, was a San Ildefonso Pueblo painter and artist in several genres including metalwork. He was part of the art movement known as the San Ildefonso Self-Taught Group. His work is held by several museums, including the Smithsonian American Art Museum.

== Early life ==
Awa Tsireh was born into the San Ildefonso Pueblo. His family was very active in the arts. His parents were Alfonsita Martinez, a potter, and Juan Estaba Roybal, the nephew of potter Cresencio Martinez. His nephew José Disiderio (J.D.) Roybal also became a painter. His siblings included the artists Josefa Roybal, Santana Roybal Martinez (1909–2002), and Ralph Roybal.

Awa Tsireh was one of the earliest of the San Ildefonso painters. His formal education ended at grade school but he drew from his culture and informal training. Awa Tsireh was also among the students of Elizabeth Willis DeHuff, who instructed students in painting from her own home.

In 1917, American artist William Penhallow Henderson painted a portrait of young Awa Tsireh, which is now held by the New Mexico Museum of Art. Henderson's wife, Alice Corbin Henderson, was a patron of Awa Tsireh.

In 1920, Awa Tsireh married a young woman from his village. The following year she gave birth to a son, but both mother and child died soon after. Affected greatly, Awa Tsireh moved to his parents' home.

== Work ==
Awa Tsireh had the support of Dr. Edgar Lee Hewett, who provided studio space for him in the Palace of the Governors. His art is in the permanent collection of several museums, including the Smithsonian American Art Museum.

=== Metalwork ===
It is not known when, or from whom, Awa Tsireh learned silversmithing, but by 1931 newspaper articles described him as a painter, silversmith and dancer. Around 1930 he began working in the summer months at Garden of the Gods Trading Post in Colorado Springs, Colorado and he was employed there into the 1940s. His sister, Santana Martinez, recalled that "during the summer during the thirties and forties he used to go to a shop in Colorado Springs and do paintings and silverwork there." He worked in silver, copper, nickel silver and aluminum.

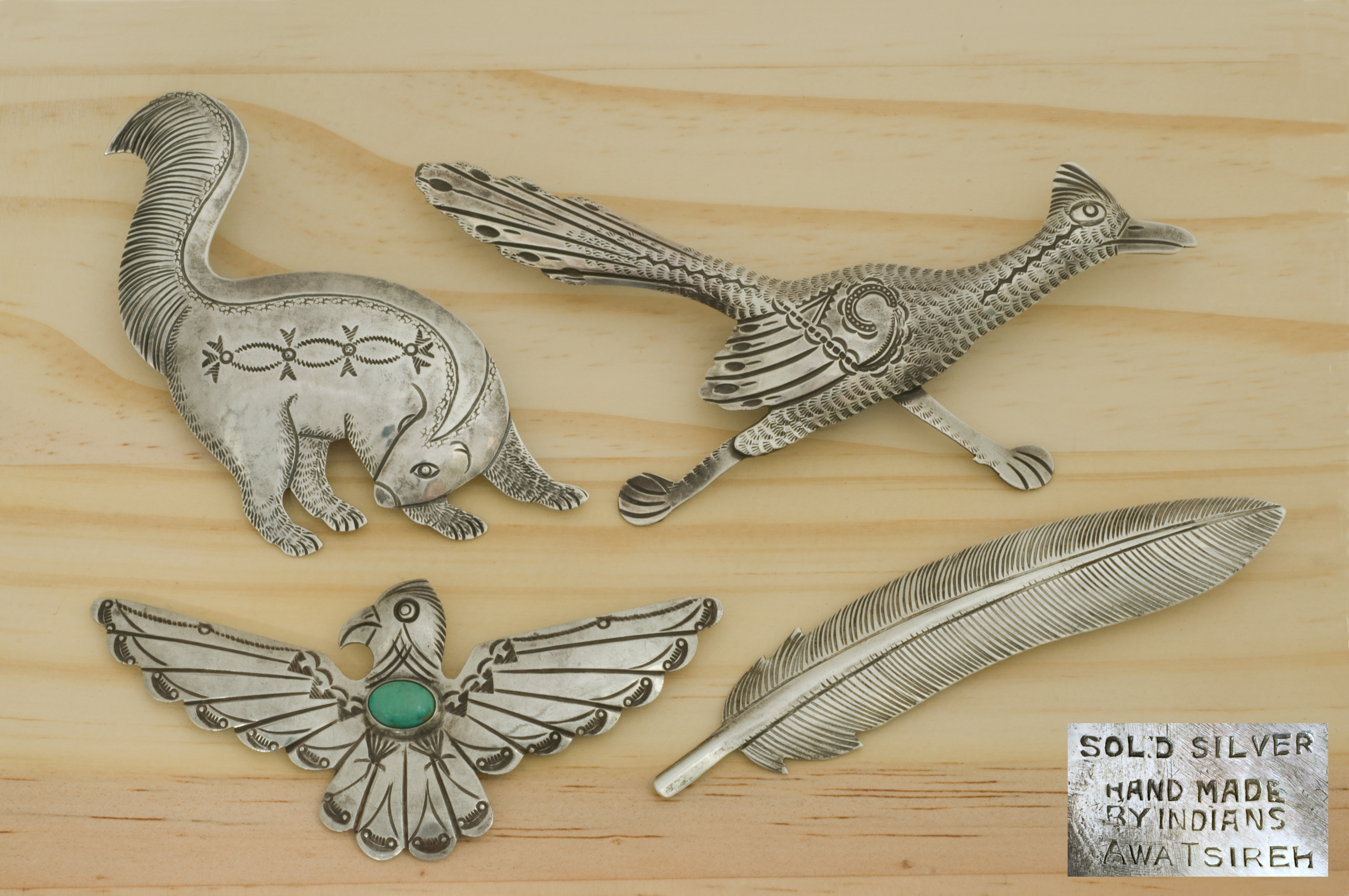
Four silver pins made by Awa Tsireh in the 1930s while he was working at Garden of the Gods Trading Post.

== Awards and honors ==
- 1931–1933 – Exposition of Indian Tribal Arts (EITA), sponsored by the College Art Association
- SWAIA, Southwestern Association on Indian Affairs, Santa Fe, New Mexico
- AIW, American Indian Week, Tulsa, Oklahoma
- 1954 – Palmes d' Academiques, from the French Government
