= San Ildefonso Pueblo, New Mexico =

San Ildefonso Pueblo
Pʼohwhogeh Ówîngeh
- Location of San Ildefonso Pueblo

Total population
- 750

Regions with significant populations
- United States (New Mexico)

Languages
- Tewa, English

Related ethnic groups
- Tewa

San Ildefonso Pueblo, New Mexico Pʼohwhogeh Ówîngeh (Tewa)
- CDP
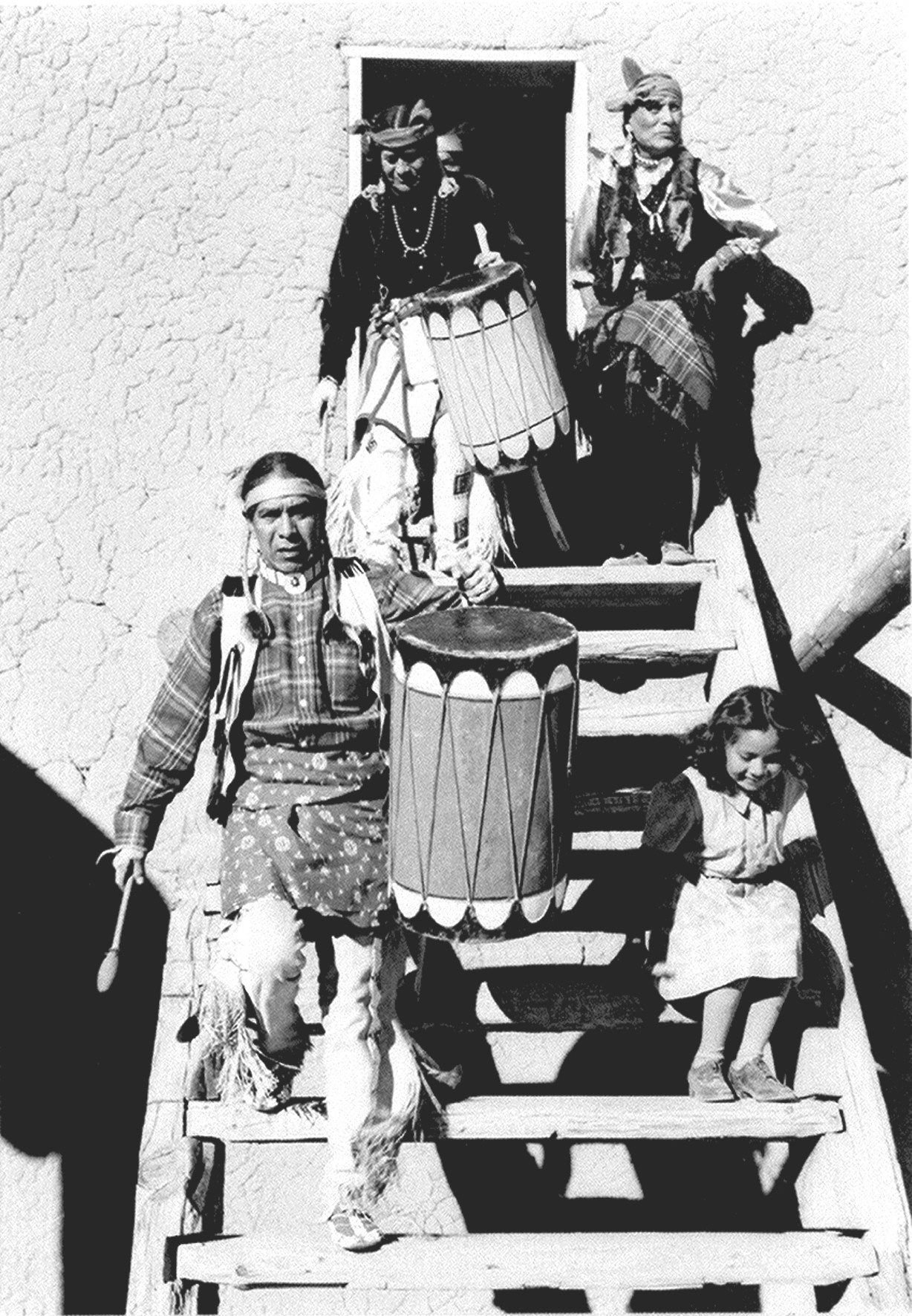
- Drummers at San Ildefonso Pueblo, 1942. Ansel Adams, photographer

- Location of San Ildefonso Pueblo, New Mexico

- Location in New Mexico Location in the United States
- Coordinates: 35°53′26″N 106°07′58″W
- Country: United States
- State: New Mexico
- County: Santa Fe

Area
  - Total: 4.61 sq mi (11.94 km^{2})
  - Land: 4.42 sq mi (11.44 km^{2})
  - Water: 0.19 sq mi (0.50 km^{2})
- Elevation: 5,528 ft (1,685 m)

Population (2020)
  - Total: 624
  - Density: 141.3/sq mi (54.55/km^{2})
- Time zone: UTC-7 (Mountain (MST))
  - Summer (DST): UTC-6 (MDT)
- ZIP code: 87501
- Area code: 505
- FIPS code: 35-68010
- GNIS feature ID: 2409256
- Website: www.sanipueblo.org
- San Ildefonso Pueblo
- U.S. National Register of Historic Places
- U.S. Historic district
- NM State Register of Cultural Properties
- Location within New Mexico
- Nearest city: Espanola, New Mexico
- Area: 46.8 acres (18.9 ha)
- Built: 1591
- NRHP reference No.: 74001206
- NMSRCP No.: 230

Significant dates
- Added to NRHP: June 20, 1974
- Designated NMSRCP: December 30, 1971

San Ildefonso Pueblo (Tewa: Pʼohwhogeh Ówîngeh, pronounced [pʼòhxʷòɡè ʔówîŋɡè], transl. 'village of the place where the water cuts through'), also known as the Turquoise Clan, is a census-designated place (CDP) in Santa Fe County, New Mexico, United States, and a federally recognized tribe, established c. 1300 AD. The Pueblo is self-governing and is part of the Santa Fe, New Mexico Metropolitan Statistical Area. As of the 2020 census, San Ildefonso Pueblo had a population of 624. San Ildefonso Pueblo is a member of the Eight Northern Pueblos, and the pueblo people are from the Tewa ethnic group of Native Americans, who speak the Tewa language.

== Geography ==
According to the United States Census Bureau, the pueblo has a total area of 4.2 square miles (11 km^{2}), of which 3.9 square miles (10 km^{2}) is land and 0.2 square miles (0.52 km^{2}) (5.54%) is water.

San Ildefonso Pueblo is located at the foot of Black Mesa.

== Demographics ==
As of the census of 2010, there were 524 people residing in the San Ildefonso CDP. The racial makeup was 62.2% Native American, 11.3% White, 21.2% from other races, and 5.3% from two or more races. Hispanic or Latino of any race were 31.9% of the population. There were 212 households, out of which 29.7% had children under the age of 18 living with them. As of 2010, the population was distributed with 26.3% under the age of 18, 14.3% who were 65 years of age or older, females comprised 51.7%, and males comprised 48.3% of the population.

Historical population
Census	Pop.	Note	%±
2010	524		—
2020	624		19.1%
U.S. Decennial Census

As of 2000, the median income for a household in San Ildefonso was $30,000, and the median income for a family was $30,972. Males had a median income of $19,792 versus $19,250 for females. The per capita income for the pueblo was $11,039. About 19.1% of families and 14.9% of the population were below the poverty line, including 50.0% of those age 65 or over.

== Government ==
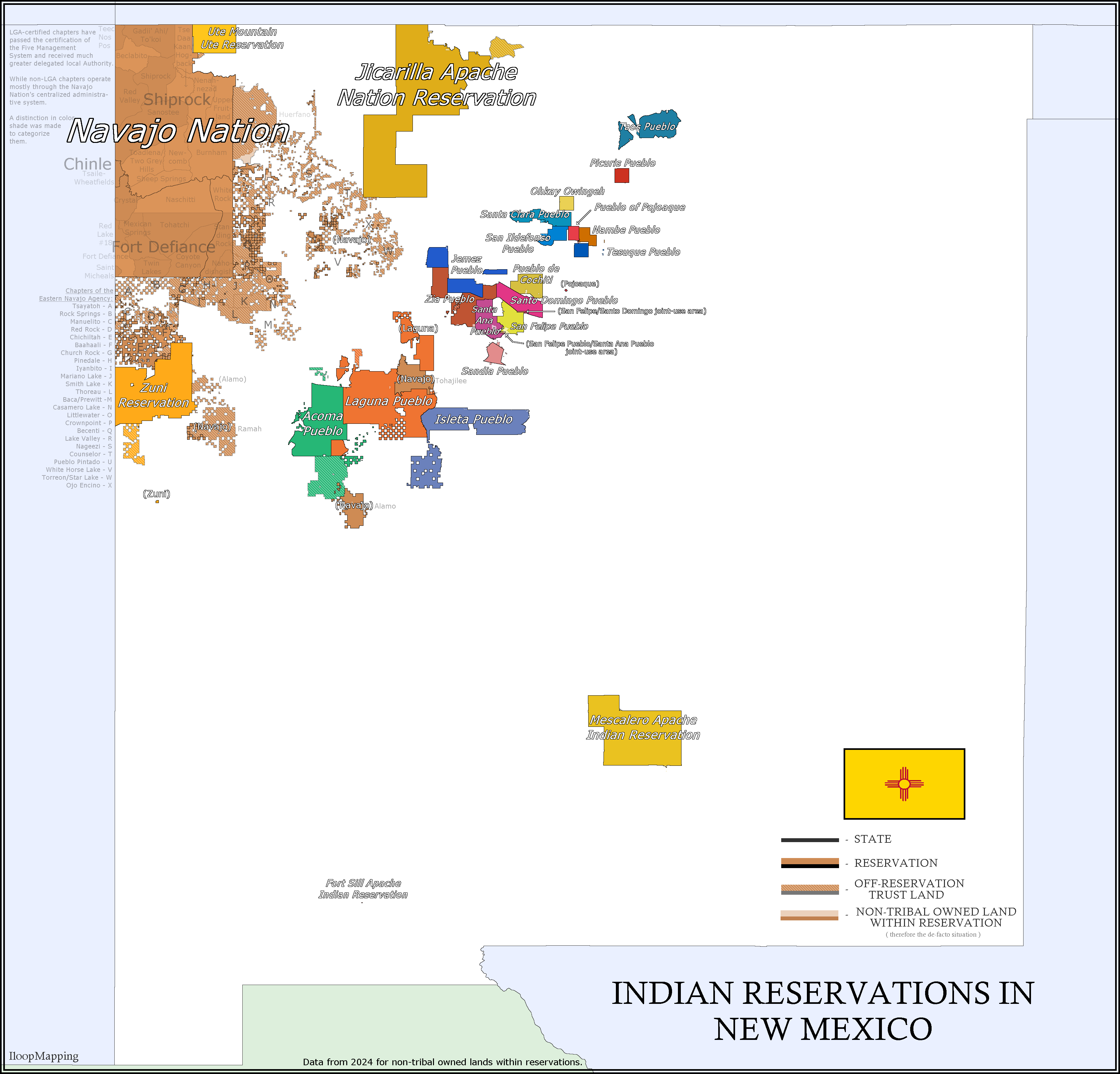
Map of the San Ildefonso and neighbouring tribes (In blue).

The administration of the Pueblo of San Ildefonso in 2025 is:

- Governor: Christopher A. Moquino
- Lieutenant Governor: Raymond John Martinez

== History ==
The pueblo was established around 1300 and founded by people who had migrated from the Mesa Verde complex in Southern Colorado, by way of Bandelier (elevation about 7000 feet), just south of present-day Los Alamos, New Mexico. People thrived at Bandelier due to the rainfall and the ease of constructing living structures from the surrounding soft volcanic rock. But after a prolonged drought, the people moved down into the valleys of the Rio Grande around 1300 (Pueblo IV Era). The Rio Grande and other arroyos provided the water for irrigation.

The Spanish conquistadors tried to subdue the native people and force Catholicism on the native people during the early 17th century, which led to the Pueblo Revolt of 1680. The people withstood the Spaniards by climbing to the top of the Black Mesa. The siege ended with the surrender of the native people, but the Spanish gave the native people some freedom of religion and other self-governing rights.

Both the people and the lands of the Pueblo of San Ildefonso were affected by intrusion of Spanish colonists. Due to these encroachments, by the 1760s some native families reported that they had no agricultural lands to support themselves. Part of their lands were restored to San Ildefonso by a 1786 decision of Governor Juan Bautista de Anza. Mexico took control of the area in 1821, and later the United States gained control in 1848 following the Treaty of Guadalupe Hidalgo. Congress created the modern reservation in 1858 confirming a grant of 17,292 acres of land to the pueblo, and the grant was patented in 1864.

By the time the land was patented under the laws of the United States in 1864, there were only 161 pueblo members left. A smallpox outbreak in 1918 took the population below 100. The people of San Ildefonso continued to lead an agricultural based economy until the early 20th century when Maria Martinez and her husband Julian Martinez rediscovered how to make the Black-on-Black pottery for which San Ildefonso Pueblo would soon become famous. From that time the Pueblo has become more tourist-oriented, with numerous tourist shops. Because of close proximity to the state capital, Santa Fe, and the presence of the Los Alamos National Laboratory, many of those employed in the pueblo have state or federal government jobs.

== Politics ==
San Ildefonso is governed by a civil government consisting of an executive branch (the governor) and a legislative branch (the tribal council).

The pueblo has experienced political controversy in recent years with significant appeals to the Bureau of Indian Affairs. In 2011, former pueblo Lt. Governor Paul D. Rainbird was sentenced to 33 months on federal charges of illegal trafficking in contraband cigarettes. In 2012, the Interior Board of Indian Appeals vacated BIA decisions to acknowledge the results of an election for Governor of the Pueblo of San Ildefonso for the 2008/09 term which had resulted in the governorship of Leon Roybal.

In 2012, the Pueblo adopted a new constitution through general election overseen by the Bureau of Indian Affairs. One of the results of the new constitution is that, for the first time, women are allowed to run for tribal council positions. To date, there is no publicly available copy of the newly adopted constitution. The 1996 San Ildefonso Code is the most recent available copy of local laws governing the pueblo.

== Economic development ==
The San Ildefonso Pueblo Enterprise Corporation (SIPEC) is a federally chartered Section 17 Corporation which is wholly owned by the Pueblo de San Ildefonso. SIPEC is charged with working with companies and individuals who share a vision of utilizing the Pueblo's strategic location for fostering economic and job growth for the Pueblo de San Ildefonso.

== Education ==
It is zoned to Pojoaque Valley Public Schools. Pojoaque Valley High School is the zoned comprehensive high school.

The Bureau of Indian Education operates the San Ildefonso Day School, an elementary school, in the pueblo.

== Culture ==
The people of San Ildefonso have a strong sense of identity and retain ancient ceremonies and rituals tenaciously, as well as tribal dances. While many of these ceremonies and rituals are closely guarded, San Ildefonso Feast Day is open to the public every January 23. Other dances open to the public include Corn Dance, which occurs in the early to mid-part of September, and dances at Easter.

There was an art movement called the San Ildefonso Self-Taught Group, which included such noted artists as Alfonso Roybal, Tonita Peña, Julian Martinez, Abel Sanchez, Crecencio Martinez, and Jose Encarnacion Peña.

== Notable people ==
- Alfred Aguilar (b. 1933), painter and ceramicist
- José Angela "Joe" Aguilar (b. 1898), potter and painter
- José Vicente Aguilar (b. 1924), painter
- Clara Archilta (1912–1994), watercolor painter and beadworker
- Gilbert Benjamin Atencio (1930–1995), painter
- Awa Tsireh a.k.a. Alfonso Roybal (1898–1955), watercolor artist
- Crucita Calabaza also known as Blue Corn (1921–1999), pottery artist
- Joe Herrera (1923–2001), painter
- Edgar Lee Hewett (1865–1946), anthropologist, instrumental to the development of the San Ildefonso Self Taught Group
- Manuel Lujan (1928–2019), member of the U.S. House of Representatives (1969–1989), United States Secretary of Interior (1989–1993)
- Julian Martinez (1879–1943), pottery artist
- Maria Martinez (1887–1980), pottery artist
- Jose Encarnacion Peña (1902–1979), painter
- Tonita Peña (1893–1949), watercolor artist
- Oqwa Pi (also known as Abel Sanchez; 1899–1971), painter, watercolorist, muralist
- Josefa Roybal, painter, potter
- Martina Vigil-Montoya (1856–1916), ceramics painter

== Gallery ==
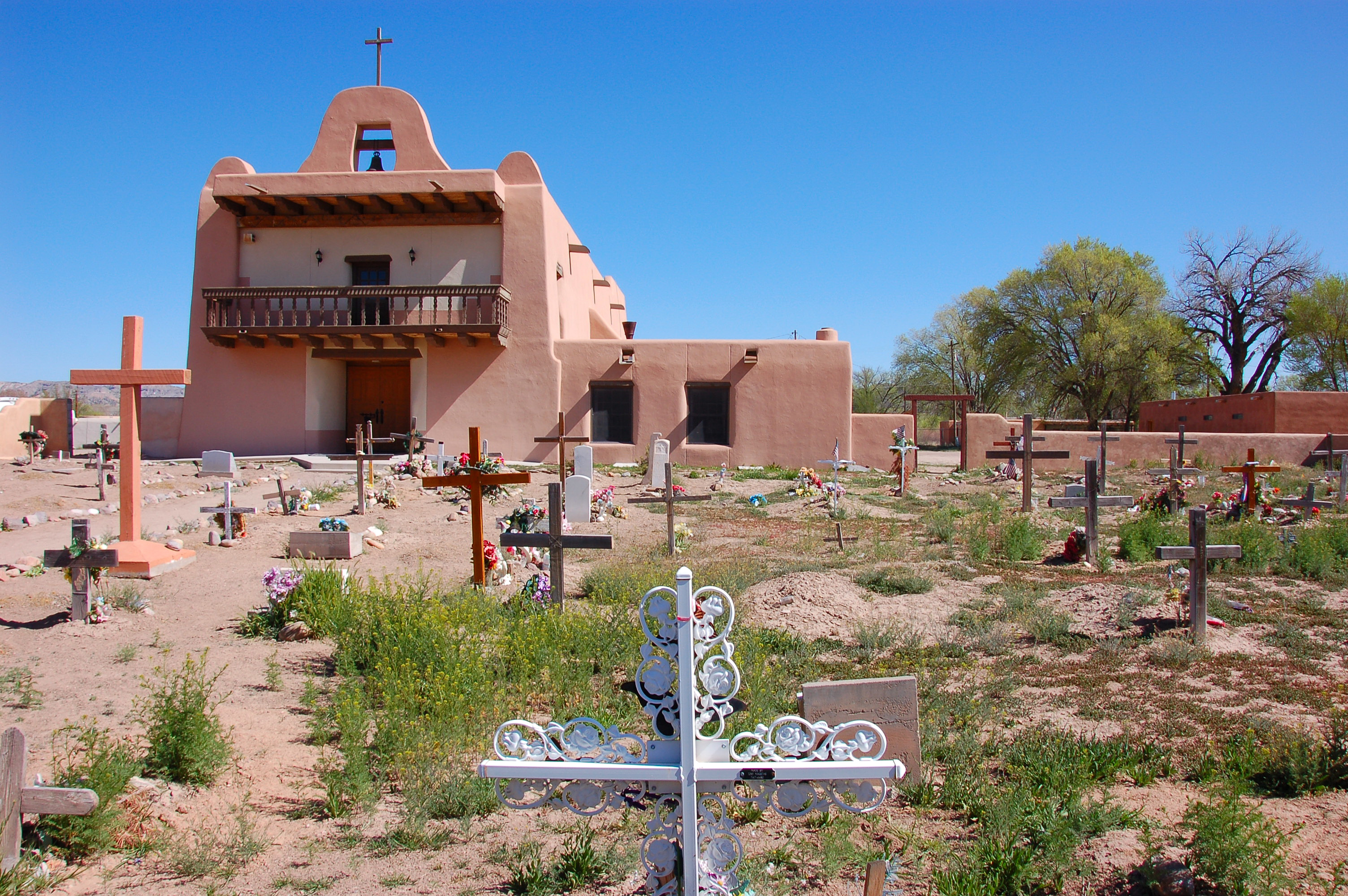
Church and cemetery at San Ildefonso Pueblo

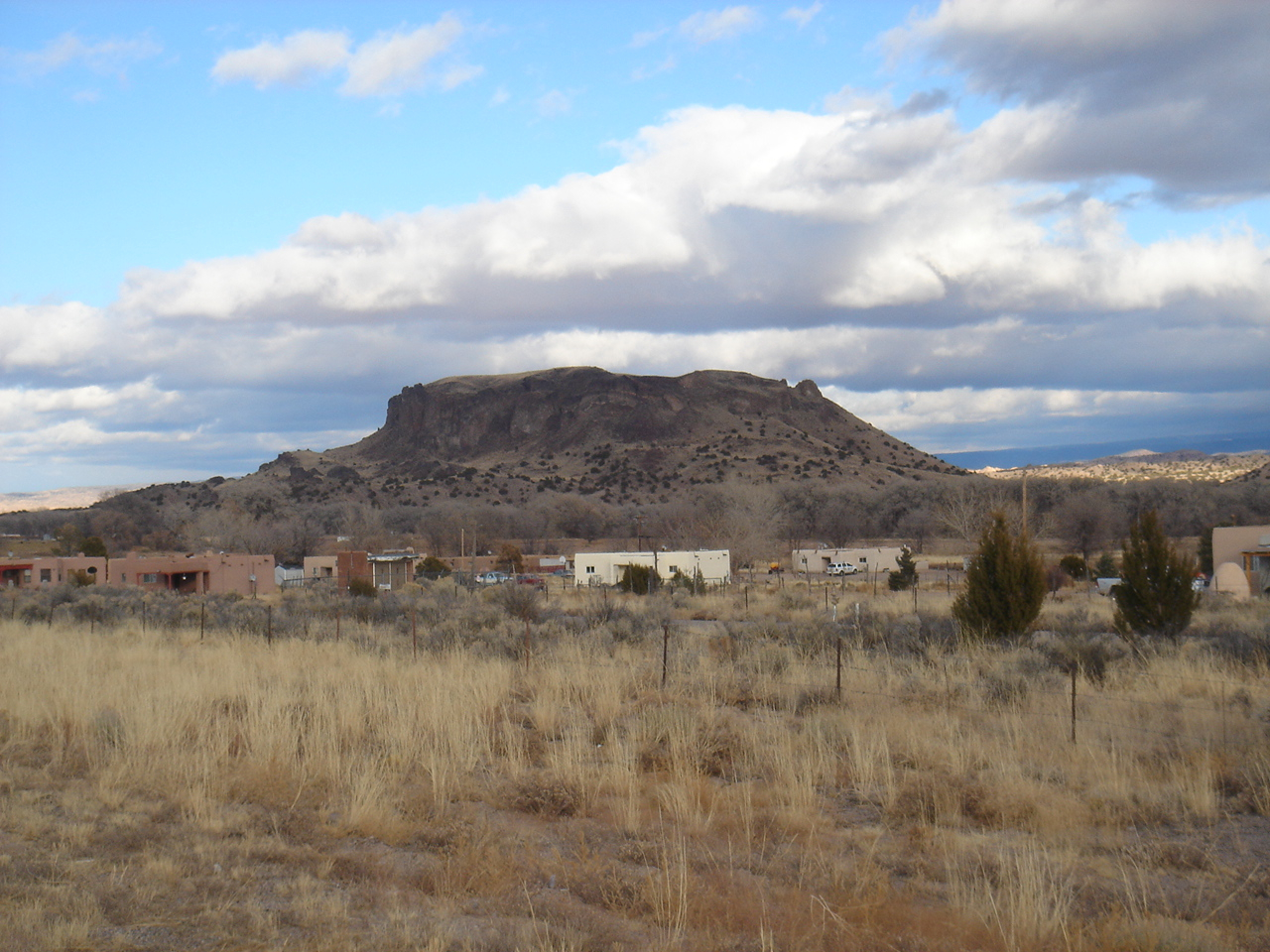
Black Mesa

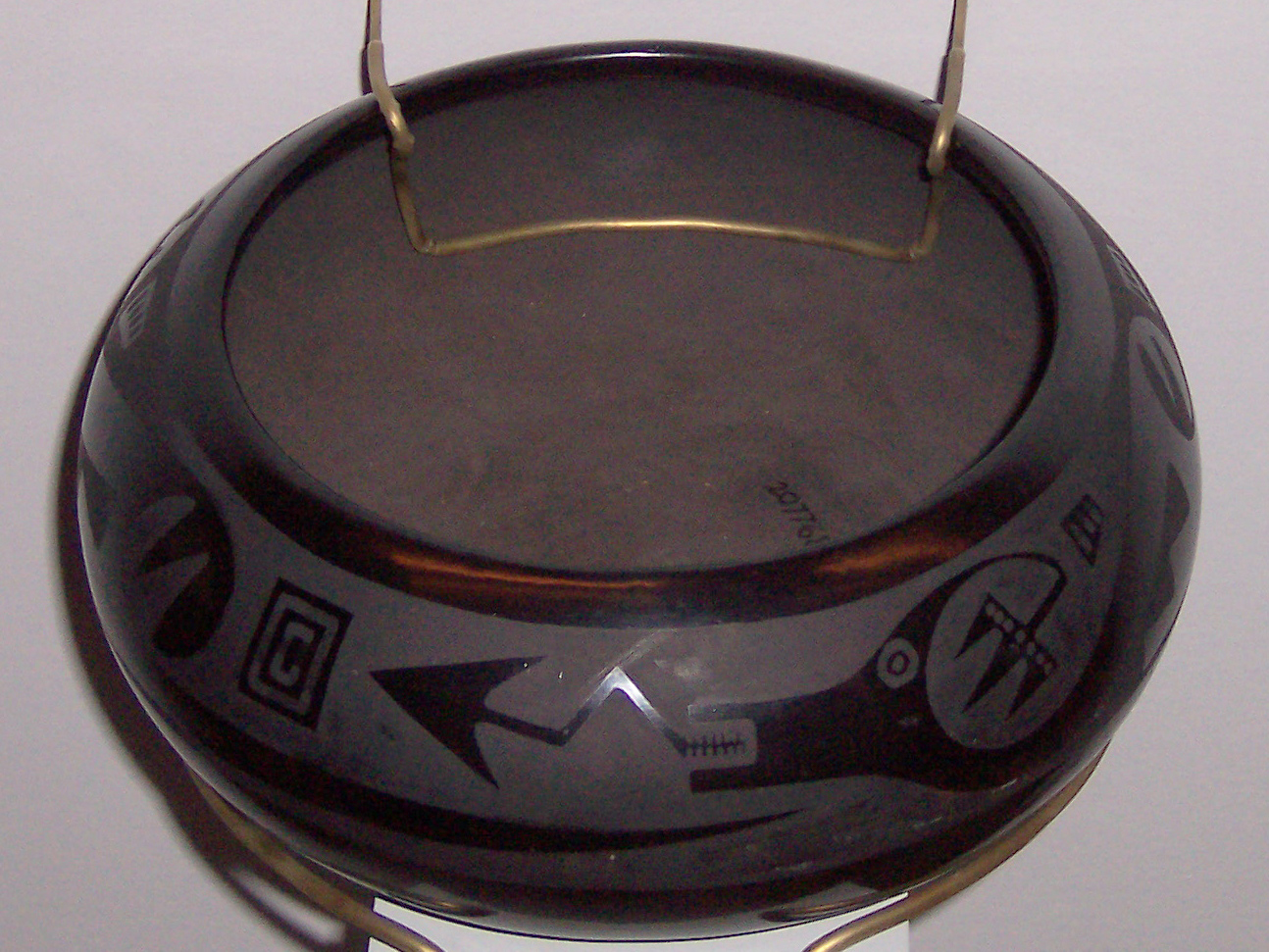
Black-on-Black pottery of the pueblo. Artifact at the Field Museum, Chicago

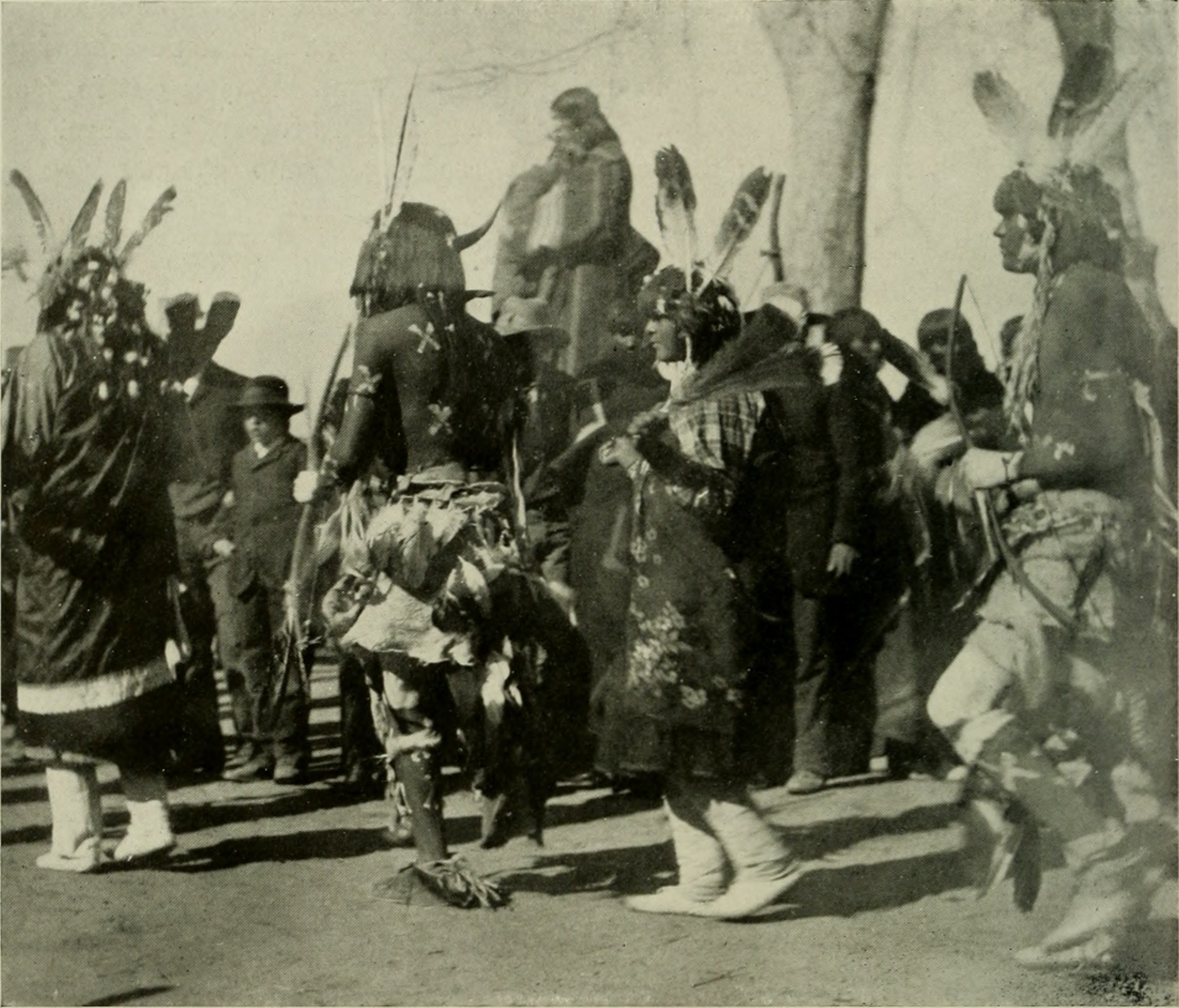
Buffalo Dance photo by Edwin Deming from 1915

== See also ==
- Acquiring land for Los Alamos Laboratory
- National Register of Historic Places listings in Santa Fe County, New Mexico
- Tsankawi cliff dwellings
- Tsirege archaeological site
