= Jim Abeita =

American painter (born 1947)

- Born: 1947 (age 78–79); Crownpoint, New Mexico, U.S.
- Education: American Academy of Arts, Chicago, Illinois
- Occupation: Painter
- Years active: 1968–present day
- Known for: Oil painting
- Notable work: The American Indians of Abeita: His people (book)
- Relatives: Emerson Abeita (brother)

Jim Abeita (also known as James Abeita, Jimmy Abeita and James Abeyta; born 1947) is a Navajo oil painter from Crownpoint, New Mexico. He is best known for his realistic landscapes and portraits depicting his native people and their history and traditions. He was one of the first Native American artists to work in contemporary realism, painting with depth and shadow instead of in the flat-style traditional Native American art. Abeita is praised as a pioneering artist who modernized the Native American art scene, made it famous in the art market and paved the way for a new generation of artists.

In the late 1960s, Abeita started entering art competitions. In the early 1970s, Abeita continued entering art competitions, but also joined artistic circles and partnered with galleries. He started showing and selling his work through the Mullarky Studio and Camera Shop and the Kiva Gallery in Gallup, New Mexico. His first commercial success came when he was recognized in 1971 by country musician Johnny Cash, who commissioned several album covers, family portraits, and eventually some 30 paintings. Abeita painted Cash's portrait for the cover of Johnny Cash Collection: His Greatest Hits, Volume II album, a cover for Cash's religious album Johnny Cash Sings Precious Memories, and a painting of Jesus for The Johnny Cash Show. Commissions from other celebrities followed.

Through the 1970s and 1980s, Abeita regularly showed, sold, and competed at Southwest fairs, festivals, and tribal events. Among the events were the New Mexico State Fair, the Inter-Tribal Indian Ceremonial, the Heard Museum Guild Indian Fair and Market, the Totah Festival, and other. His work has been exhibited at the Museum of Northern Arizona and the Navajo Nation Museum, and numerous galleries. His paintings have been used as covers or illustrations for Southwest Art, Arizona Highways, Artists Of The Rockies, New Mexico Magazine, and other magazines. In 1976, he published The American Indians of Abeita: His People, a book with 108 reproductions of his oil paintings of the Navajo people, their homeland and traditions.

Since 2011, Abeita has lived in semi-retirement. He still paints for his own pleasure, exhibits occasionally, and takes part in artistic events and fan meetings. A pivotal figure in contemporary Navajo art, Abeita is considered among the most prominent Native American artists alongside Julian Martinez, Pablita Velarde, Helen Hardin, Harrison Begay, R. C. Gorman, and Fritz Scholder.

== Art and influence ==
'Market Drive' painting by Jim Abeita

Abeita is most famous for his realistic landscapes, and portraits painted with oil paint. His works are inspired by the everyday Navajo life. Abeita's ability to capture everyday life, as well as meticulous details of his art were highly esteemed, and called "unmistakably accurate." Since childhood, his main subjects were people, animals and lands around him. On rare occasions, he created intense images such as warriors and battle scenes, but his main focus has always been peaceful day-to-day life and traditions of his Native people.

Realism differentiated Abeita's art from that of most traditional Native American artists, as did his use of oil at a time when most Navajo art was being done with watercolor and casein. The Native American flat-style approach, depicting subjects without shadow or depth, developed during the 1920s and 1930s and still predominated in the 1970s. Abeita chose instead to work in styles inspired by modern Western American artists, creating paintings that appear three-dimensional. One of his major inspirations was Frederic Remington and his paintings of the American Old West. Abeita has called himself a "Western-Indian" artist. In 1997, Abeita's work was described as being in the "Transitional Modernism" style, representing a traditional Native American way of life using Modernist techniques and principles.

The pursuit of novelty in Navajo art was what made Abeita famous. By 2000s, Abeita was praised for revolutionizing the Navajo art scene and renowned as one of the most experienced Native American painters in the Western American art field. In the modern art scene, Abeita is considered a pivotal figure in contemporary Navajo art. His works have long been famous in collectors' circles around the world,

Abeita often helped, guided and encouraged other people of his Native American community to learn oil painting. Over the years, he inspired new generations of Native American painters to develop a realistic approach in their art. His followers praise him for influencing the development and marketability of Native American art and for paving the way for modern Native American artists. Successful Native American artists such as Anthony Chee Emerson, James King, Ryan Singer, Calvin Toddy, and Alice Yazzie have named Abeita as an influence and inspiration.

== Early life and family ==
Abeita was born in 1947, in Crownpoint, New Mexico, on the Diné (Navajo) Reservation. Abeita is a Tsenabahilnii (Sleep Rock People Clan) and born for Ashiihi (Salt People Clan), which are the indications for his mother's and father's origin families, respectively.

Jim Abeita's parents were Mary and Howard Abeita; they lived in Crownpoint until at least 1973. Jim was the second oldest of 16 siblings. His younger brother, Emerson Abeita, also became a painter. As a child, Abeita often lived in Becenti Chapter, near Crownpoint, with his grandmother, and helped raise sheep in Canyon de Chelly.

By 1955, Abeita moved to Salt Lake City to attend a school on a placement. There he lived with a foster family, who were Mormon, and he has since identified as a Mormon himself.

== Education and first artistic steps ==
Abeita started drawing at age 4. In his younger years, he used watercolors or charcoal from a stove as his paint. Since that time, Abeita knew he wanted to be an artist. He made his first steps in painting looking up to his uncle, Joe Charley, a self-taught painter.

In 1953, Abeita enrolled in the Crownpoint Boarding School. From there, he went to Salt Lake City on a school placement program and lived with a foster family. Abeita received his first painting awards while in Salt Lake City. To nurture his talent, his foster family gave 11-year-old Abeita his first oil painting kit for Christmas. Within a year, he had learned the basics of painting with it. One of Abeita's earliest and strongest inspirations was the oil artwork of Norman Rockwell, in particular his piece on the cover of The Saturday Evening Post.

Abeita studied in Salt Lake City until his senior year, and then returned to New Mexico to finish at Gallup High School in 1966. A top student in his regular art class, he was always up for experimentation, and often did independent work, concentrating on painting. His high school art teacher, Duane Berg, said Abeita could paint anything that was asked for. Berg helped Beita showcase and sell his first works at the Gallup's Inter-Tribal Indian Ceremonial, an annual event with themed Native American parades, rodeos, art exhibits, and other cultural activities.

After graduating from high school, Abeita took a summer job at the Eastern Navajo Agency. The agency superintendent Kent Fitzgerald noticed Abeita's talent and determination to become a painter, and suggested that he choose an art school and apply to it on a Bureau of Indian Affairs (BIA) scholarship. Abeita took the advice, acquired a scholarship, and enrolled at the American Academy of Fine Arts in Chicago, Illinois. He married Hannah Foster, and together they moved to Chicago in about 1967.

Abeita enrolled in a 15-month art course at the American Academy of Arts in Chicago. Determined to learn the principles of oil painting, Abeita completed a preceding and obligatory 9 month art fundamentals course in one month, and jumped into a subject he was more interested in. According to a later account, Abeita enrolled in a two-year art program, which he completed within less than six months.

== Career ==
=== Early career (1960s–1970s) ===
In the late 1960s and early 1970s, Abeita was a regular at art competitions. His competition debut was at the New Mexico State Fair in 1968. Since then, he has taken part in other competitions, such as the Heard Museum Indian Arts and Craft Show (Phoenix, Arizona), Scottsdale National Indian Art Exhibition (Scottsdale, Arizona), Inter-Tribal Indian Ceremonial (Gallup, New Mexico), and others. Within a decade, he had earned a string of awards and gained significant recognition in the contemporary Native American art scene.

During their years in Chicago, Abeita's wife, Hannah, promoted her husband's paintings by taking them from gallery to gallery around the city. She sold several to a local gallery which had branches across the world; later, the gallery placed orders for more of Abeita's work.

While in Chicago, Abeita painted a portrait of Johnny Cash. In 1971, encouraged by his wife, he took the portrait to Cash's concert in hopes of getting it signed by the singer. The couple weren't allowed backstage, but Cash's manager took the painting and showed it to Cash.

A few months later, Cash invited Abeita and his wife and children to his home in Tennessee. There, Abeita did another portrait of Cash, which became the album cover for The Johnny Cash Collection: His Greatest Hits, Volume II. It was Abeita's first commercially produced painting, for which he received commission and which brought him national fame.

As Cash's guest, Abeita did portraits of the musician's son, four daughters, mother-in-law, and a painting of Jesus for The Johnny Cash Show. He ended up doing some 30 portraits for Cash.

After the album came out, Abeita's gained attention in the music industry. Columbia Records and RCA Records offered him partnerships. Further in his career, Abeita painted portraits for a number of other celebrities.

=== Private and commercial success (1970s–2000) ===
Around 1971–1972, Abeita and his family left Chicago and returned to his native town of Crownpoint, New Mexico. Abeita worked as a freelance painter, and exhibited in New Mexico and other states. He partnered and worked almost exclusively with photographer and businessman, Nello T. Guadagnoli, who promoted and helped him start selling his paintings through the Mullarky Studio and Camera Shop (at the time popular venture in artistic circles). Guadagnoli also helped Abeita get into the Kiva Gallery (the partnership with the gallery lasted until 2003, when it closed). Both galleries were in Gallup, New Mexico. The partnerships brought Abeita success in the art market.

In 1972, Abeita was listed among the "outstanding Indian artists, living and dead" alongside Julian Martinez, Pablita Velarde, Helen Hardin, Harrison Begay, R. C. Gorman, Fritz Scholder, and others. That same year, he had his first solo show at the Main Trails Gallery, in Scottsdale, Arizona and was in the exhibition Indian Artists, part of a major art event at the Albuquerque Convention Center, dedicated to New Mexico's progress in the different fields of visual arts.

In 1972, Abeita competed alongside renowned Native American artists at the Gallup Inter-Tribal Indian Ceremonial Art Show. His painting "Praying Hands" won Grand Prize in the Acrylic Portraits category, and "Silversmith" Third Place in the same category; "Hunting in Beauty" received the Memorial Award, "Canyon de Chelly" received First Place and "Spider Rock" received Second Place in the category Oil or Acrylic Landscapes.

By 1973, Abeita was gaining recognition success among art collectors. Galleries in Texas, Wyoming, Arizona, and New Mexico started buying his work.

From 1974 to 1978, he worked on commission for the Tanner's Annual Invitational in Scottsdale, Arizona, painting group portraits of competition winners.

In 1975, Abeita painted the album cover for Johnny Cash, this time for his religious album, Johnny Cash Sings Precious Memories. That same year, two of Abeita's paintings were listed as being part of the C. G. Wallace Collection, then considered one of the most important collections of Zuni and Navajo jewelry, art, and historic pieces. Part of this collection was later donated to the Heard Museum in Phoenix, Arizona, while the other part was sold at Sotheby's auction in Phoenix.

In 1982, Abeita again took part in the Inter-Tribal Indian Ceremonial exhibiting his work and hosting an art workshop.

In 1988, his paintings were in The Navajo – Yesterday, Today & Tomorrow exhibition at Eagles Roost Gallery in Colorado Springs, Colorado. This exhibition was considered one of the biggest shows of Native American art. A year later, Abeita took part in the show Paint, Bronze, and Stone at the Mitchell Museum of the American Indian, in Evanston, Illinois.

For several years in early 1990s, Abeita paused his career. In 1995, he returned with an exhibition at the annual Totah Festival Indian Art Show at the Farmington Civic Center in Farmington, New Mexico. That year, his painting "The Medicine Woman" was selected for the festival's poster. The original painting auctioned at the festival and other works were for sale.

By 1995, Abeita's works were part of the public collection at the Museum of Northern Arizona in Flagstaff, Arizona. He also had paintings exhibited at the Heard Museum Guild Indian Fair and Market (Phoenix, Arizona), the New Mexico State Fair, the Navajo Tribal Fair, and the Southwestern Association on Indian Affairs (since 1993, known as the Southwestern Association for Indian Arts).

In 1997, Abeita was featured in the Journal of Intercultural Studies art research. He was recorded as one of the best known Native American artists working on Western American Art.

==== Printed works and publications ====
In 1974, one of Abeita's paintings was chosen by the New Mexico Public Service Company as the subject of its annual lithograph. His works were used for covers and inside-covers of Arizona Highways in 1974, 1976, and 1978.

In 1976, he published the book, The American Indians of Abeita: His People, with 108 reproductions of his oil paintings. Johnny Cash wrote a special dedication for the book. The book received a positive review from The Pacific Historian, which called Abeita "a genius," and stated that his ability and pace in painting field were "remarkable."

Over the years, Abeita's images have been published in many books, newspapers, and periodicals including Southwest Art (1974), Navajo Tribal Fair (program cover, 1974), Artists Of The Rockies(1974), Arizona Living (cover, 1976; inside, 1982), The Indian Trader (1980, 1982), New Mexico Magazine (1983), and Dandick Travel–New Mexico (cover, 1983).

=== Current activity (2000–present) ===
In 2006, Abeita was named the Gallup Inter-Tribal Indian Ceremonial's "Living Treasure". In 2009, he was a grand marshal for the 63rd Annual Navajo Nation Fair parade and painted a poster for the fair.

By 2011, Abeita was focusing on creating art not commercially, but primarily for his own pleasure. In 2011, the Navajo Nation Museum held a retrospective of his work, including some 70 of paintings done over the course of almost 50 years. Some of the works were provided by Abeita himself, some were loaned by art collectors, and several paintings from Johnny Cash's personal collection were donated by the Cash family. That same year, one of Abeita's paintings was part of the Salt Lake City's Church History Museum collection donated by Abeita's Salt Lake City foster parents.

In 2017, his biography was featured in the book Legendary Locals of Gallup, New Mexico.

In 2018, Abeita was still active in artistic circles and attending artistic events. He took part in the Gallup Native Arts Market, where Native American artists came to show and sell their work.

== Exhibitions ==
Year	Name	Location	Gallery/Event	Ref
1971		Jackson Hole, Wyoming	Four Seasons Gallery	
1971–1972	Original Indian Paintings	Gallup, New Mexico	Mullarky Studio and Camera Shop	
1972–2003		Gallup, New Mexico	Kiva Gallery	
1972		Scottsdale, Arizona	Main Trails Gallery	
1972	Indian Artists	Albuquerque, New Mexico	Albuquerque Convention Center	
1973		Albuquerque, New Mexico	Brandywine Galleries	
1982		Gallup, New Mexico	Inter-Tribal Indian Ceremonial	
1988	The Navajo–Yesterday, Today & Tomorrow	Colorado Springs, Colorado	Eagles Roost Gallery	
1989	Paint, Bronze, and Stone	Evanston, Illinois	Mitchell Museum of the American Indian	
		Flagstaff, Arizona	Museum of Northern Arizona	
		Phoenix, Arizona	Heard Museum Guild Indian Fair and Market	
		Window Rock, Arizona	Navajo Tribal Fair	
		Albuquerque, New Mexico	New Mexico State Fair	
1995		Farmington, New Mexico	Farmington Civic Center/Totah Festival	
2011		Window Rock, Arizona	Navajo Nation Museum	
2018		Gallup, New Mexico	Gallup Native Arts Market	

== Awards ==
Year	Award(s)	Event	Location	Ref
1968	Grand Prize; Most Popular Painting; 1st, 2nd, 3rd places	New Mexico State Fair	Albuquerque, New Mexico	
1969	1st place; State Fair purchase prize	New Mexico State Fair	Albuquerque, New Mexico	
1970	1st place	New Mexico State Fair	Albuquerque, New Mexico	
1971	Grand Prize; Best of Show; 3rd place	Heard Museum Guild Indian Fair and Market	Phoenix, Arizona	
1972	Grand Prize; Memorial Award; Woodward Award; Best in Class; 1st, 2nd, 3rd places in different categories	Inter-Tribal Indian Ceremonial	Gallup, New Mexico	
1973	2-1st places; 2-3rd places; Grand Prize; honorable mention	Inter-Tribal Indian Ceremonial	Gallup, New Mexico	
1973	Grand Prize; Best Painting; Merit Award	New Mexico State Fair	Albuquerque, New Mexico	
c. 1973	2-1st places, 2-2nd place, 2-3rd places	Scottsdale National Indian Art Exhibition	Scottsdale, Arizona	
1974	Grand Award	Scottsdale National Indian Art Exhibition	Scottsdale, Arizona	
1975	1st place	Southwestern Association of Indian Affairs (later Southwestern Association for Indian Arts)	Indian Market, Santa Fe, New Mexico	
1976	1st place; Best in Class	Inter-Tribal Indian Ceremonial	Gallup, New Mexico	
1979	2-1st places	Inter-Tribal Indian Ceremonial	Gallup, New Mexico	
1985	1st place; Mullarky Award	Inter-Tribal Indian Ceremonial	Gallup, New Mexico	
1986	1st place	Inter-Tribal Indian Ceremonial	Gallup, New Mexico	
1987	1st place; Best in Category; Best in Class; Mullarky Award	Inter-Tribal Indian Ceremonial	Gallup, New Mexico	
1988	1st place	Inter-Tribal Indian Ceremonial	Gallup, New Mexico	
1991	1st place	Inter-Tribal Indian Ceremonial	Gallup, New Mexico	
2013	Special Memorial Award; Allen and Leona Rollie Award	Inter-Tribal Indian Ceremonial	Gallup, New Mexico	

== Personal life ==
Abeita married Hannah Foster Abeita on March 25, 1967. Hannah was born on June 19, 1949, in Sheep Springs, New Mexico and attended Gallup High School. Hannah and Jim had three children, son Troy and daughters, Michelle and Carmen (or Carma).

After 3–4 years in Chicago, the Abeita family returned to Crownpoint, New Mexico in 1971 or 1972, where they settled for good to be closer to nature and able to enjoy outdoor activities–favorites of the whole family. Jim and Hannah were active members of the Church of Jesus Christ of Latter-day Saints.

Hannah Abeita died in a car crash on July 12, 1975, and was buried in Crownpoint.

Abeita became long-time friends with Johnny Cash after meeting him in 1971. Their families were also friendly: Cash taught their children how to swim, and once threw a party for the Abeitas, inviting other celebrities over to join them. Though his acquaintance with Cash, Abeita met actor Burt Reynolds, country musician Waylon Jennings, singer and actress Dolly Parton, and musician Roy Orbison. Jennings and Reynolds had Abeita's paintings in their personal collections.

In 1973, Cash invited the Abeitas to his concert in Las Vegas, Nevada, and they spent three days at the Hilton Inn in Las Vegas with the singer. Abeita invited Cash to the Navajo land on occasion, where Cash visited and performed for Abeita's community. Johnny Cash attended Hannah Abeita's funeral in 1975.

Cash referred affectionately to his friend in the lyrics of his 1975 song Navajo:

I have seen your red rock canyons out of Gallup
I have walked upon your Arizona hills
At Crownpoint I watched an artist painting
All the secrets of your past surviving still.

— Johnny Cash, Navajo

== See also ==
- Navajo
- Julian Martinez
- Pablita Velarde
- Helen Hardin
- Harrison Begay
- R. C. Gorman
- Fritz Scholder
- New Mexico State Fair
- Navajo Nation Museum

== Literature cited ==
- "Original Indian Paintings", Gallup Independent, Gallup: Gallup Independent Co., p. 3, January 8, 1972, ISSN 1099-6052, OCLC 10674822
- "Abeita wins Grand Prize in Art show", Albuquerque Journal, Albuquerque: Journal Publishing Company, p. 24, August 11, 1972, ISSN 1526-5137, LCCN sn83025329, OCLC 9392114
- "'Praying Hands' best in class: Abeita wins art sweepstakes at Gallup", Arizona Daily Sun, Flagstaff: Coconino Sun Co., p. 2, August 12, 1972, ISSN 1054-9536, LCCN sn86091251, OCLC 10668635
- "Civic center opens four art exhibitions", Albuquerque Journal, Albuquerque: Journal Publishing Company, p. 24, September 24, 1972, ISSN 1526-5137, LCCN sn83025329, OCLC 9392114
- "Art notes: Taos artist in Fine Art Biennial", Taos News, Taos: Taos Publishing Co., p. 8, May 30, 1973, ISSN 1937-481X, LCCN sn84020638, OCLC 11280710
- "Arts, crafts at fair diversified", Albuquerque Journal, Albuquerque: Journal Publishing Company, pp. F6, September 14, 1973, ISSN 1526-5137, LCCN sn83025329, OCLC 9392114
- "Public Service Co. offers Abeita print", New Mexican, Santa Fe: New Mexican Inc., p. 19, April 28, 1974, LCCN sn84020632, OCLC 8531549
- "Obituary: Dies in crash", Gallup Independent, Gallup: Gallup Independent Co., p. 6, July 14, 1975, ISSN 1099-6052, OCLC 10674822
- "Hannah F. Abeita", Arizona Republic, Phoenix: C. A. Stauffer, p. 35, July 15, 1975, ISSN 0892-8711, LCCN sn83045137, OCLC 2609778
- "Navajo artist offers book of paintings", Clovis News-Journal, Clovis: Richard Hindley, p. 6, September 21, 1976, LCCN sn84020648, OCLC 11302139
- Drabanski, Emily, ed. (September 1, 1983), "Jim Abeita", New Mexico Magazine, vol. 61, Santa Fe: State of New Mexico, p. 42, ISSN 0028-6249, LCCN 83646112, OCLC 1759915
- "Artist Jim Abeita highlights festival", San Juan Record, Monticello: B. J. Brewington, p. 29, August 30, 1995, ISSN 0894-3273, LCCN sn86091407, OCLC 13979339
- "Deaths", Gallup Independent, Gallup: Gallup Independent Co., December 10, 2008, ISSN 1099-6052, OCLC 10674822
- "'92nd annual Inter-Tribal Indian Ceremonial arts & crafts competition winners", Gallup Independent, Gallup: Gallup Independent Co., p. 19, August 24, 2013, ISSN 1099-6052, OCLC 10674822
- Adams, Maggie A. (August 13, 2018), Reyes, Richard (ed.), "Native Arts Market envisions world where 'there is no hate'", Gallup Independent, Gallup: Gallup Independent Co., p. 1, ISSN 1099-6052, OCLC 10674822
- Begay, Jason (September 10, 2009), Beyal, Duane A. (ed.), "Evolving image: Navajo Nation Fair poster emerged as artist Abeita pondered and painted", Navajo Times, Window Rock: Navajo Times Publishing Company, ISSN 2166-4242, LCCN sn86091573, OCLC 16464595
- Calvin, Carolyn (February 10, 2011), Beyal, Duane A. (ed.), "The color of beauty: Artist Jim Abeita leaped to fame through realistic oil paintings", Navajo Times, Window Rock: Navajo Times Publishing Company, pp. A10, ISSN 2166-4242, LCCN sn86091573, OCLC 16464595
- Chancellor, Kyle (August 4, 2017), ""Legendary Locals": New book highlights local history", Gallup Independent, Gallup: Gallup Independent Co., p. 3, ISSN 1099-6052, OCLC 10674822
- Clurman, Irene (December 18, 1971), "Portrait by Navajo artist gains National fame", Gallup Independent, Gallup: Gallup Independent Co., p. 10, ISSN 1099-6052, OCLC 10674822
- Hardin-Burrola, Elizabeth; Sarath, Carol; Rosebrough, Bob (2017), Legendary locals of Gallup New Mexico, Legendary locals, Charleston: Arcadia Publishing, ISBN 978-1467125673, LCCN 2017942084, OCLC 1004636283
- Hope, Bob (January 2, 1975), "Abeita designs cover", Gallup Independent, Gallup: Gallup Independent Co., p. 11, ISSN 1099-6052, OCLC 10674822
- Kane, George (October 21, 1988b), "Three displays open today in Springs", The Gazette, Colorado Springs: Freedom Newspapers, Inc., p. 9, LCCN sn82015766, OCLC 8814329
- Kane, George (October 28, 1988a), "Monument elk may be Las Vegas bound", The Gazette, Colorado Springs: Freedom Newspapers, Inc., p. 9, LCCN sn82015766, OCLC 8814329
- Lester, Patrick D. (1995) [1968], The biographical directory of Native American painters (1 ed.), Tulsa: SIR Publications, ISBN 0806199369, LCCN 95069012, OCLC 34721611
- Martinez, Tomas O. (August 8, 1982), "Inter-Tribal Indian Ceremonial to cite Navajo Code Talkers", Albuquerque Journal, Albuquerque: Journal Publishing Company, p. 60, ISSN 1526-5137, LCCN sn83025329, OCLC 9392114
- Reynolds, Richard (June 1, 1977), "Book Review: The American Indians of Abeita, "His Life"", Pacific Historian, vol. 21, no. 2, Stockton: University of the Pacific, pp. 88–89, ISSN 0030-8676, LCCN 67006744, OCLC 1761673
- Ronald, A. L. (August 21, 1973), "A modern-day story of success", Gallup Independent, Gallup: Gallup Independent Co., p. 9, ISSN 1099-6052, OCLC 10674822
- Ronald, A. L. (January 6, 1974), "Crownpoint artist reaps benefits from his talent", Albuquerque Journal, Albuquerque: Journal Publishing Company, p. 29, ISSN 1526-5137, LCCN sn83025329, OCLC 9392114
- Shebala, Marley (April 7, 2018), Reyes, Richard (ed.), "Unusual treasures find their way to Navajo Museum", Gallup Independent, Gallup: Gallup Independent Co., p. 6, ISSN 1099-6052, OCLC 10674822
- Smith, Noel Lyn (April 21, 2011b), Beyal, Duane A. (ed.), "A revolution in painting: Navajo Nation Museum's Abeita show spans career of famous artist", Navajo Times, Window Rock: Navajo Times Publishing Company, ISSN 2166-4242, LCCN sn86091573, OCLC 16464595
- Smith, Noel Lyn (October 6, 2011a), Beyal, Duane A. (ed.), "Fair poster combines past, present, future", Navajo Times, Window Rock: Navajo Times Publishing Company, ISSN 2166-4242, LCCN sn86091573, OCLC 16464595
- Warner, John A. (1997), Ito, Michiharu; Hlawatsch, George O.; Scott, Paul D.; Nishimura, Tadamasa (eds.), "Contemporary Native American Arts: Traditionalism & Modernism", Journal of Intercultural Studies, vol. 24, Hirakata: Intercultural Research Institute, pp. 20–101, ISSN 0388-0508, LCCN 81640974, OCLC 2745703
- Wells, Helen Pinion (November 1, 1975), Guy, Hubert; Ashton, Robert; Ashton, Sharon (eds.), "The C. G. Wallace collection", American Indian Art Magazine, vol. 1, no. 1, Scottsdale: American Indian Art, Inc., p. 17, ISSN 0362-2630, LCCN 76643141, OCLC 2288031
- Wilks, Flo (June 3, 1973), "Brandywine show to future Navajo artist and two others", Albuquerque Journal, Albuquerque: Journal Publishing Company, p. 33, ISSN 1526-5137, LCCN sn83025329, OCLC 9392114
