= Abeita =

Abeita is a surname. Notable people with the surname include:

- Emerson Abeita (1957–2017), Navajo painter from New Mexico, US
- Jim Abeita (born 1947), Navajo painter from New Mexico, US
- Louise Abeita (1926–2014), American writer, poet, and educator
- Pablo Abeita (1871–1940), American politician

== See also ==
- People with last name Abeyta
