= Abeyta =

Abeyta is a surname. Notable people with the surname include:

- Aaron Abeyta (born 1965), better known as El Hefe, American musician
- Michelle Paulene Abeyta, American politician
- Narciso Abeyta (1918–1998), American painter and silversmith
- Pablita Abeyta (1953–2017), American sculptor

== See also ==
- Abeyta, Colorado, an extinct town in Las Animas County, Colorado, United States
- People with last name Abeita
