= Precious Memories =

Precious Memories may refer to:

- Precious Memories (hymn), a traditional Gospel hymn credited to J. B. F. Wright
- Precious Memories (Alan Jackson album), 2006
- Precious Memories (Dolly Parton album), 1999

== See also ==
- Sings Precious Memories, a 1975 album by Johnny Cash
