= Emerson Abeita =

American painter (1957–2017)

- Born: May 19, 1957; Crownpoint, New Mexico, U.S.
- Died: February 3, 2017 (aged 59); Albuquerque, New Mexico, U.S.
- Burial place: Crownpoint Community Cemetery, Crownpoint, New Mexico, U.S.
- Occupations: Painter; heavy equipment operator
- Known for: award-winning Native American Navajo oil painter
- Relatives: Jim Abeita (brother)

Emerson Abeita (May 19, 1957 – February 3, 2017) was an American Navajo painter from Crownpoint, New Mexico. He made oil paintings and was primarily known for his depiction of Navajo people, nature, and animals. He was a younger brother of another well-known Navajo painter, Jim Abeita.

Emerson Abeita received an artistic education at the American Academy of Arts in Chicago, Illinois and at the Evanston Art Center in Evanston, Illinois in the late 1970s–early 1980s. Afterwards, he started exhibiting and competing at events like the New Mexico State Fair, the Inter-Tribal Indian Ceremonials, and the Navajo Tribal Fair and Rodeo, often winning prizes for his art. Abeita's work was shown in places like the New Mexico State Fair Fine Arts Gallery and the Gallup Public Library alongside painters like Archie Blackowl. His art was used as newspaper illustrations.

== Early life, family, and education ==
Emerson Abeita was born on May 19, 1957, in Crownpoint, New Mexico. His parents were Mary C. and Howard Abeita. He was a member of the Navajo Native American tribe.

Abeita was one of 16 siblings. His brothers include Jim Abeita, also a well-known Navajo painter, Harrison, Roger, Vern, Ernest, and Marvin. His sisters were Maryann (or Marry Ann) Tracy, Vivian Hubbard, Lorena Charles, Laverne Watchman, Vaida Black, Velma, Rosita, Debra Abeita, and Sheila Levaldo.

As an art student in late 1970's and early 1980's, Abeita received his education at the American Academy of Arts in Chicago, Illinois and at the Evanston Art Center, in Evanston, Illinois.

== Career ==
'Original Navajo horse riders near sandstone cliffs' painting by Emerson Abeita

Abeita worked as a full-time oil painter. In his colorful works, he depicted his native Navajo people and their life, as well as nature and animals.

In 1983, Abeita won awards at the New Mexico State Fair in Albuquerque, New Mexico. That year, his award-winning works were also shown in the New Mexico State Fair Fine Arts Gallery within the Retrospect 1983 exhibition. He exhibited alongside Archie Blackowl and many other Native American painters.

In 1986, Abeita won both the first and second prizes in the "Oil painting, symbolic" category at the New Mexico State Fair. One year later, Abeita had his own painting exhibition in the Gallup Public Library and his art work was published in The Indian Trader newspaper.

By 1995, Abeita had exhibited his works and won prizes in other competitions like the annual Inter-Tribal Indian Ceremonials in Gallup, New Mexico (later held in Church Rock, New Mexico) and the annual Navajo Tribal Fair and Rodeo in Window Rock, Arizona.

In his later life, Abeita was a heavy equipment operator.

== Personal life ==
Abeita moved away from Crownpoint, New Mexico. In 1995, he lived in Gallup. In his later years, he lived in Albuquerque. He was a member of the Church of Jesus Christ of Latter-day Saints.

Abeita was married to Dorene Jimmie Abeita. They had sons, Michael and Steven Abeita, who spent their lives in Albuquerque. They also had a daughter, Kala Abeita, who later lived in Grants, New Mexico.

Abeita died on February 3, 2017, in Albuquerque, New Mexico and was buried in the Crownpoint Community Cemetery on February 9, 2017.

== See also ==
- Jim Abeita
- Navajo
- Evanston Art Center
- New Mexico State Fair

== Literature cited ==
- Watkins, Gregory (ed.), "Emerson Abeita: original Navajo horse riders near sandstone cliffs", Worthopedia, Atlanta: WorthPoint Corporation
- "Emerson Lee Abeita", Tributes.com, Boston: Tributes, Inc.
- "The New Mexico State Fair", Albuquerque Journal, Albuquerque: Journal Publishing Company, p. 31, November 20, 1983, ISSN 1526-5137, LCCN sn83025329, OCLC 9392114
- "State Fair Results", Albuquerque Journal, Albuquerque: Journal Publishing Company, pp. С10, September 19, 1986, ISSN 1526-5137, LCCN sn83025329, OCLC 9392114
- Drabanski, Emily, ed. (1987), "Exhibits", New Mexico Magazine, vol. 65, Santa Fe: State of New Mexico, p. 12, ISSN 0028-6249, LCCN 83646112, OCLC 1759915
- "Deaths", Gallup Independent, Gallup: Gallup Independent Co., December 10, 2008, ISSN 1099-6052, OCLC 10674822
- Reyes, Richard, ed. (January 26, 2017), "Marvin Abeita", Gallup Independent, Gallup: Gallup Independent Co., p. 3, ISSN 1099-6052, OCLC 10674822
- Reyes, Richard, ed. (February 9, 2017), "Emerson Lee Abeita", Gallup Independent, Gallup: Gallup Independent Co., p. 3, ISSN 1099-6052, OCLC 10674822
- Emerson Abeita: artist file, Santa Fe: Institute of American Indian Arts, 2021, OCLC 1014027789
- Havlice, Patricia Pate (2002), Index to artistic biography. Second supplement, vol. 1, Lanham: Scarecrow Press, ISBN 0810840626, LCCN 2001049154, OCLC 47658953
- Lester, Patrick D. (1995) [1968], The biographical directory of Native American painters (1 ed.), Tulsa: SIR Publications, ISBN 0806199369, LCCN 95069012, OCLC 34721611
