= Pablita =

Pablita is a feminine given name. Notable people with the name include:

- Pablita Abeyta (1953–2017), American Navajo sculptor and activist
- Pablita Velarde (1918–2006), American Pueblo artist and painter
