= Then Sings My Soul =

Then Sings My Soul may refer to:

- Then Sings My Soul (album), a 2009 album by Ronnie Milsap
- "Then Sings My Soul", part of the refrain of the hymn How Great Thou Art
- Then Sings My Soul, a 1984 film musical/documentary featuring George Beverly Shea
- "Then sings my soul : 150 of the world's greatest hymn stories" a book by Robert J. Morgan
