= Johnny Cash Sings Precious Memories =

Studio album by Johnny Cash
- Released: January 1975
- Studio: House of Cash Recording Studios, Hendersonville, Tennessee
- Genre: Gospel
- Length: 30:06
- Label: Columbia
- Producer: Johnny Cash

Johnny Cash chronology
The Johnny Cash Children's Album (1975)	Johnny Cash Sings Precious Memories (1975)	John R. Cash (1975)

Johnny Cash Sings Precious Memories is the fifth gospel and 50th overall album by country singer Johnny Cash, released in 1975 on Columbia Records. It is one of several spiritual albums that he recorded. Other examples include Hymns by Johnny Cash, Hymns from the Heart, The Holy Land and Believe in Him. The song selection includes several of Cash's personal favorites, as some would later be recorded again for My Mother's Hymn Book. Precious Memories may have been a replacement for an untitled Gospel album that Cash recorded during 1975 but never released; those recordings would be released in 2012 on the album Bootleg Vol. IV: The Soul of Truth. The albums was dedicated to Cash's late brother, Jack D. Cash, who died in May 1944.

Professional ratings
Review scores
Source	Rating
Allmusic	link

== Track listing ==
No.	Title	Writer(s)	Length
1.	"Precious Memories"	J.R. Baxter, W.B. Stevens	2:53
2.	"Rock of Ages"	Brantley C. George, Billy Walker	2:20
3.	"The Old Rugged Cross"	George Bennard	2:48
4.	"Softly and Tenderly"	Will L. Thompson	2:48
5.	"In the Sweet By and By"	Sanford Fillmore Bennett, Joseph Philbrick Webster	2:47
6.	"Just as I Am"	William Batchelder Bradbury, Charlotte Elliott	3:10
7.	"Farther Along"	J.R. Baxter, John Starling	3:06
8.	"When the Roll Is Called Up Yonder"	James Milton Black	2:05
9.	"Amazing Grace"	John Newton, William Walker; arranged by Clyde Williams	2:27
10.	"At the Cross"	Ralph C. Hudson, Isaac Watts	2:50
11.	"Have Thine Own Way, Lord"	Adelaide A. Pollard, George C. Stebbins, Walker	2:52

== Personnel ==
- Johnny Cash - vocals, guitar
- Bob Wootton, Carl Perkins, Johnny Christopher, Jerry Shook, Pete Wade - guitar
- Marshall Grant, John C. Williams - bass
- WS Holland - drums
- Beegie Crusser - piano
- Bill Walker - piano, arrangements, conductor
- Bill Harris, Farrell Morris - percussion
- The Carter Family - vocals

Technical

- Charlie Bragg, Ed Hudson, Freeman Ramsey, Roger Tucker - engineer
- Bill Barnes, Julie Holiner - album design
- Jim Abeita - front cover painting
