= Tony Abeyta =

New Mexico Artist Tony Abeyta

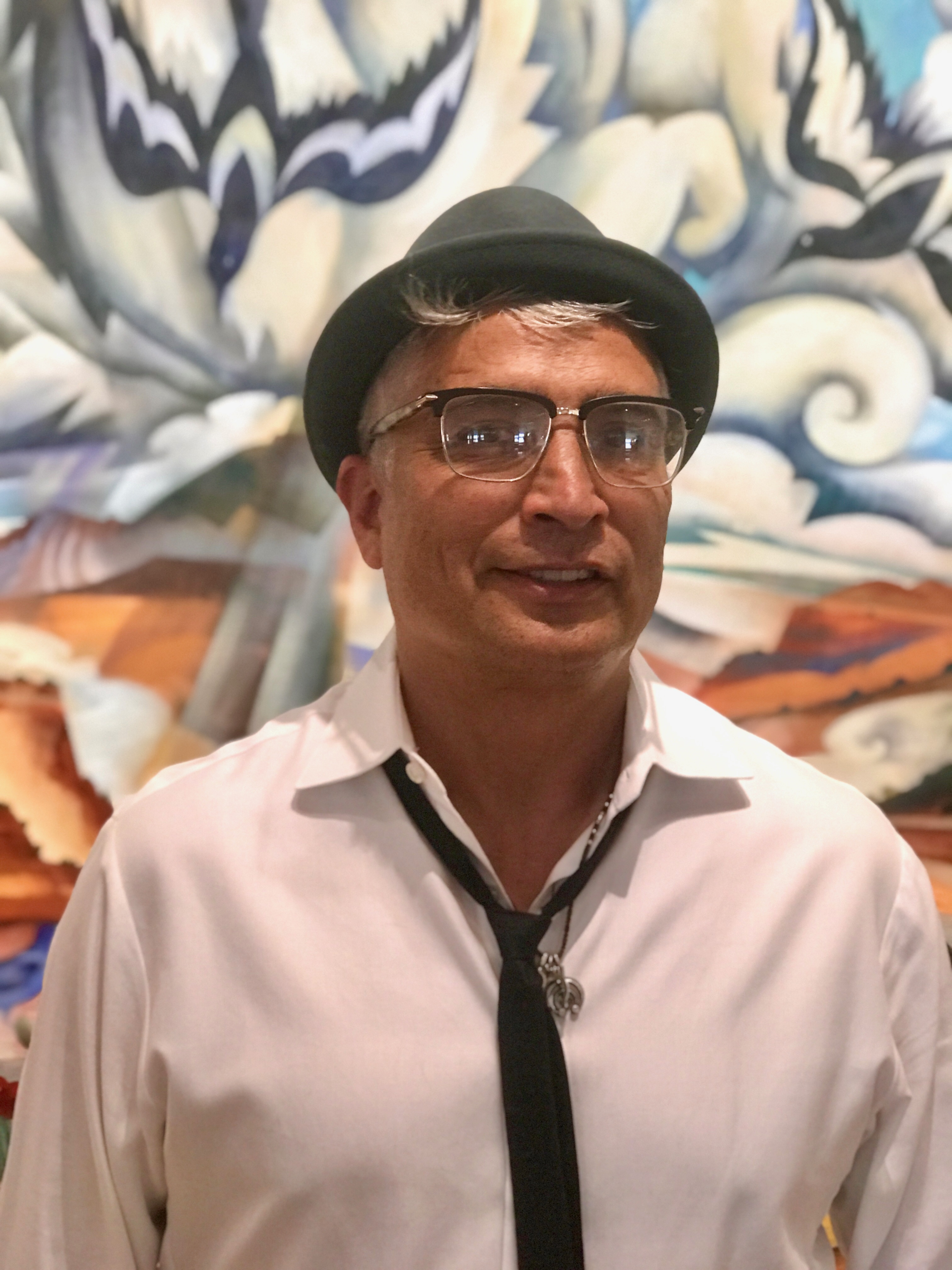
Tony Abeyta in 2021

Tony Abeyta (born November 6, 1965) is a contemporary Navajo Diné artist living between Berkeley California and Santa Fe, New Mexico. Abeyta's work is most well known as mixed media paintings and oil landscapes of the American southwest. His subject matter includes the New Mexico landscape, ancestral Navajo iconography and American Modernism

== Early life and education ==
Abeyta was born in Gallup, New Mexico to Navajo painter Narciso "Ciso" Platero Abeyta and Sylvia Ann, a Quaker ceramics artist. He was the youngest of three children.

He received an Associate of Fine Arts degree from the Institute of American Indian Arts in Santa Fe in 1986, where he received the T.C. Cannon memorial scholarship and later, an honorary doctorate of humanities. He earned a Bachelor of Fine Arts from the Maryland Institute College of Art in 1999 and a Master of Fine Arts from New York University in 2004. Aside from his homes in New Mexico and California, he has worked and studied in Baltimore, New York, Chicago, Florence, Italy, Venice, Italy, and the South of France.

== Career ==
Abeyta has lived and painted in both Santa Fe New Mexico and Berkeley, California. He has had numerous solo shows in Santa Fe and Sedona, Arizona, and has participated in multiple group shows in Santa Fe, Sedona, Los Angeles, California, and New York, New York.

His work has been included in the Smithsonian's National Museum of the American Indian, Washington D.C., Museum of Fine Arts, Boston, Museum of Contemporary Native Art, Santa Fe, New Mexico, Wheelwright Museum, Santa Fe, New Mexico, Museum of Indian arts and Culture Santa Fe, New Mexico, Philbrook Museum, Tulsa, Oklahoma, Heard Museum, Phoenix, Arizona, New Mexico Museum of Art, Santa Fe, New Mexico, Denver Art Museum, Denver, Colorado, Crocker Art Museum, Sacramento, California, Autry Museum of the American West, Los Angeles, California, the Eiteljorg Museum, Indianapolis Indiana, the James Museum, Saint Petersburg, Florida, and murals at the historic La Fonda Hotel, Santa Fe, NM.

His awards include the New Mexico Governor's Excellence in the Arts Award in 2012, the Native Treasures Living Treasure in 2012 by the Museum of Indian Arts and Culture, the Gene Autry Memorial Award in 2018 from the Autry Museum of the American West, and the 2023 Medal of Arts, Art in Embassies, U.S. Department of State.
