= Have Thine Own Way, Lord =

1907 Christian hymn

- by Adelaide A. Pollard
- Genre: Hymn
- Written: 1907
- Based on: Jeremiah 18:1-6
- Meter: 5.4.5.4 D
- Melody: "Adelaide" by George C. Stebbins

"Have Thine Own Way, Lord" is a Christian hymn with lyrics by Adelaide A. Pollard and music by George C. Stebbins. It was first published in 1907 in the Northfield Hymnal with Alexander's Supplement. Later that year, it also appeared in two other popular hymnals, Ira Sankey's Hallowed Hymns New and Old and Sankey and Clement's Best Endeavor Hymns.

== Background ==
In 1902, Adelaide A. Pollard was hoping to go to Africa as a missionary but found herself unable to raise the needed funds to make the journey. Greatly discouraged, she attended a prayer service one evening and as she sat there, she overheard an elderly woman say: "It really doesn't matter what you do with us, Lord, just have your own way with our lives." The elderly woman inspired Pollard, who contemplated the story of the potter from Jeremiah 18:3 and, upon her return home that evening, wrote all four stanzas before retiring for the night.

Five years later, George Stebbins wrote a tune titled "Adelaide" to accompany the text.

== Lyrics ==
Have Thine own way, Lord! Have Thine own way!
Thou art the Potter, I am the clay.
Mold me and make me after Thy will;
While I am waiting, yielded and still.

Have Thine own way, Lord! Have Thine own way!
Search me and try me, Master, today!
Whiter than snow, Lord, wash me just now,
As in Thy presence humbly I bow.

Have Thine own way, Lord! Have Thine own way!
Wounded and weary, help me, I pray!
Power, all power, surely is Thine!
Touch me and heal me, Savior divine.

Have Thine own way, Lord! Have Thine own way!
Hold o’er my being absolute sway!
Fill with Thy Spirit ’till all shall see
Christ only, always, living in me.

== Recordings ==
"Have Thine Own Way, Lord" remains popular and has been recorded by such artists as Mahalia Jackson, Marty Robbins, Johnny Cash, Eric Copeland, Cristy Lane, Jim Reeves, Eddy Arnold, John Fogerty, Ned Beatty and, more recently, by Ronnie Milsap on his 2009 gospel album, Then Sings My Soul.
