= Western American Art =

Style of artwork

Western American Art broadly refers to artistic works which depict subjects related to or associated with the Western United States region and the Old West period. It was often overlooked before the twentieth century, during which it became the subject of academic study. In contrast with much Modern art, which focuses largely on abstraction, Western American art tends to focus more on subject and narrative than style. Commonly depicted subjects in Western American art include Cowboys, Native Americans, horses, and scenic landscapes. Narratives often include scenes demonstrating the daily life and activities in the American West.

The development of Western American art was affected by the social, political and economic factors in American society. On the one hand, factors like U.S. westward expansion fostered its development; on the other hand, the progress of Western American art was also threatened by the accompanying industrial development and spread of the modern lifestyle in the West. Western American Art experienced periods of waxing and waning popularity during its history.

== Background ==
=== The culture of cowboys ===
Cowboys in America originally came from Spain in 1519. The Spanish established ranches and stocked them with cattle and horses. Then, the native Indians were trained by the landowners to handle the livestock for maintaining and developing the ranches. During the 1700s, cattle ranches had spread north to Texas and New Mexico and as far south as Argentina, which stimulated the form of native cowboys. During the era of U.S. westward expansion, cowboys played a remarkable role. They rounded up livestock that were transported by rail around the country for sale.

In 1865 when the Civil War ended, the need for beef increased significantly due to the Union Army's consumption of the North's supply. This encouraged the development of the livestock industry, which directly stimulated the expansion of the number of cowboys.

Cowboys in America then developed their own styles that differed from that of the original vaqueros. Their special style of life and dress is called the western lifestyle. To protect themselves from burning sunlight, cowboys typically wear large hats with wide brims, boots to help them ride horses, and bandanas to shield them from dust. In order to keep their legs safe from sharp cactus needles, some cowboys wore chaps outside their trousers. When they live on a ranch, they usually share a bunkhouse with each other, and some sing songs, play guitar or harmonica, and write poetry for entertainment.

== History ==
Before the twentieth century, Western American art was not considered as important as it is in current decades. The paintings connected with the western United States were described as impoverished and too marginal in quality for serious study. Therefore, because of the desire to distance themselves from Europe in both cultural and political aspects, there were some writers who started to explore a national art that would stand for the New World more than the Old.

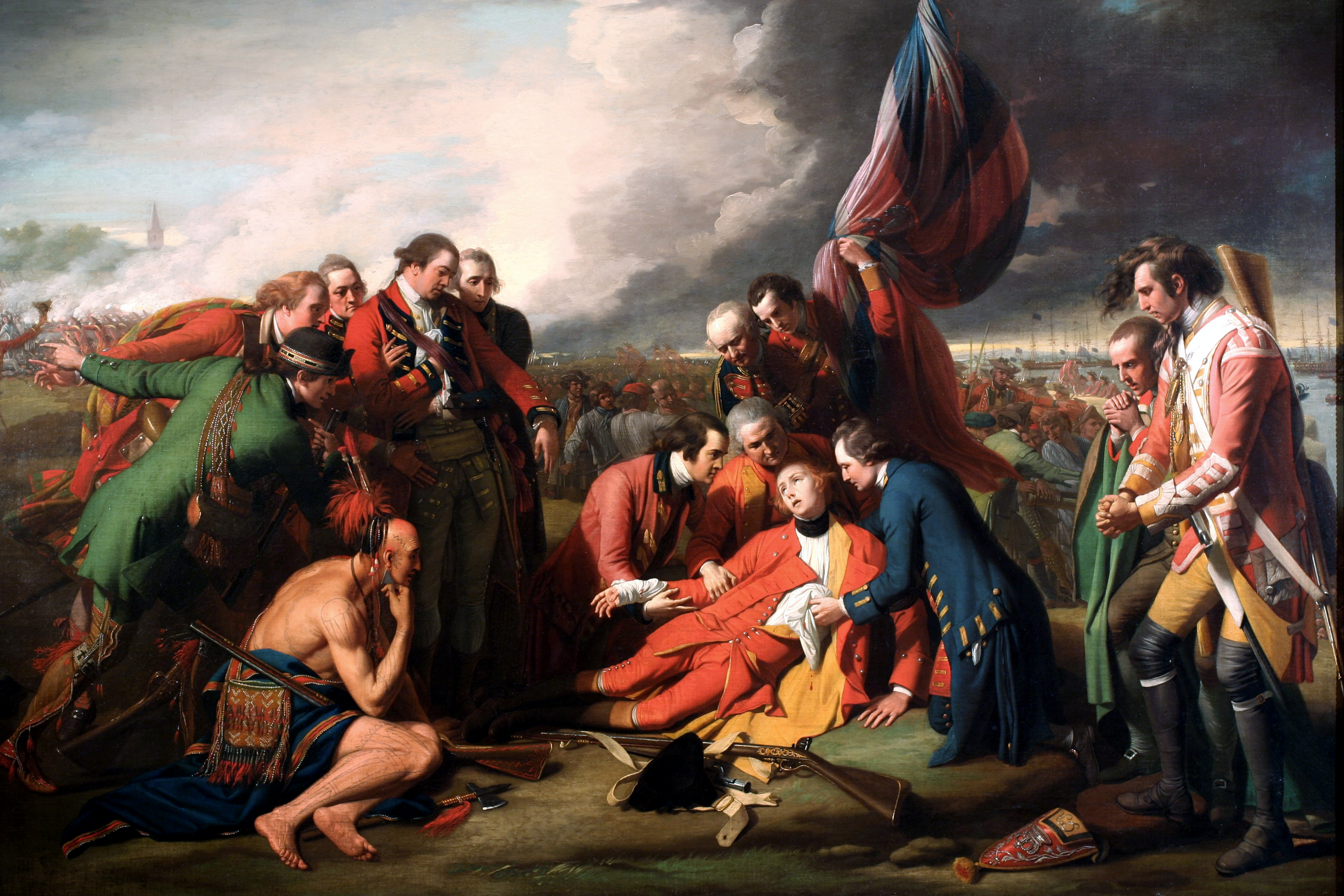
Benjamin West, The Death of General Wolfe, 1770, National Gallery of Canada, Ottawa

During the eighteenth century, the subjects of the paintings focused mainly on the dramatic landscapes of the continent, and the artists aimed to achieve accuracy of the scenes depicted in the paintings. The "Moccasin Error" in a painting called The Death of General Wolfe demonstrated how the artists during that period treated the accuracy of the subject. For this painting, Henry Laurens pointed out that the Indian in the picture was shown without moccasins, which was unrealistic because the Native warriors would not join in a fight without what they regarded as an indispensable part of their fighting equipment. Benjamin West, who painted The Death of General Wolfe, admitted this error and fixed it by adding a pair of moccasins at the left corner.

In nineteenth century, the western U.S. states and territories were considered a symbol of freedom and the unknown, encouraging artists to give support to the movement. After the Louisiana Purchase of 1803, artists and explorers were inspired by the changes to enter the West, which provided a stage for the young people to challenge their abilities. Later, more mature artists helped to form the integrated picture of the westward expansion, shaping the view of democratic values of Americans. Due to the expansion, the conflict and displacement of Native Americans came to art history in the West. George Catlin, who gave up a law career, was an example of this. Catlin began drawing portraits of Indians from more than 50 tribes, also recording hunting scenes, tribal rituals, and landscapes in his paintings. These paintings then became valued as historical resources because of the accuracy of details of the paintings. From the 1830s to 1850s, the paintings tended to concentrate on the concepts of Native Americans as "noble savages". With the increasing conflicts between white settlers and Indians around mid-century, the portrayal of Native Americans tended to be more negative, as the portrayal of Indian changed from "noble red men" to hostile savages. Thus, the major assertion became that Indians would eventually lose control of the land due to the white settlers during the late 1850s.

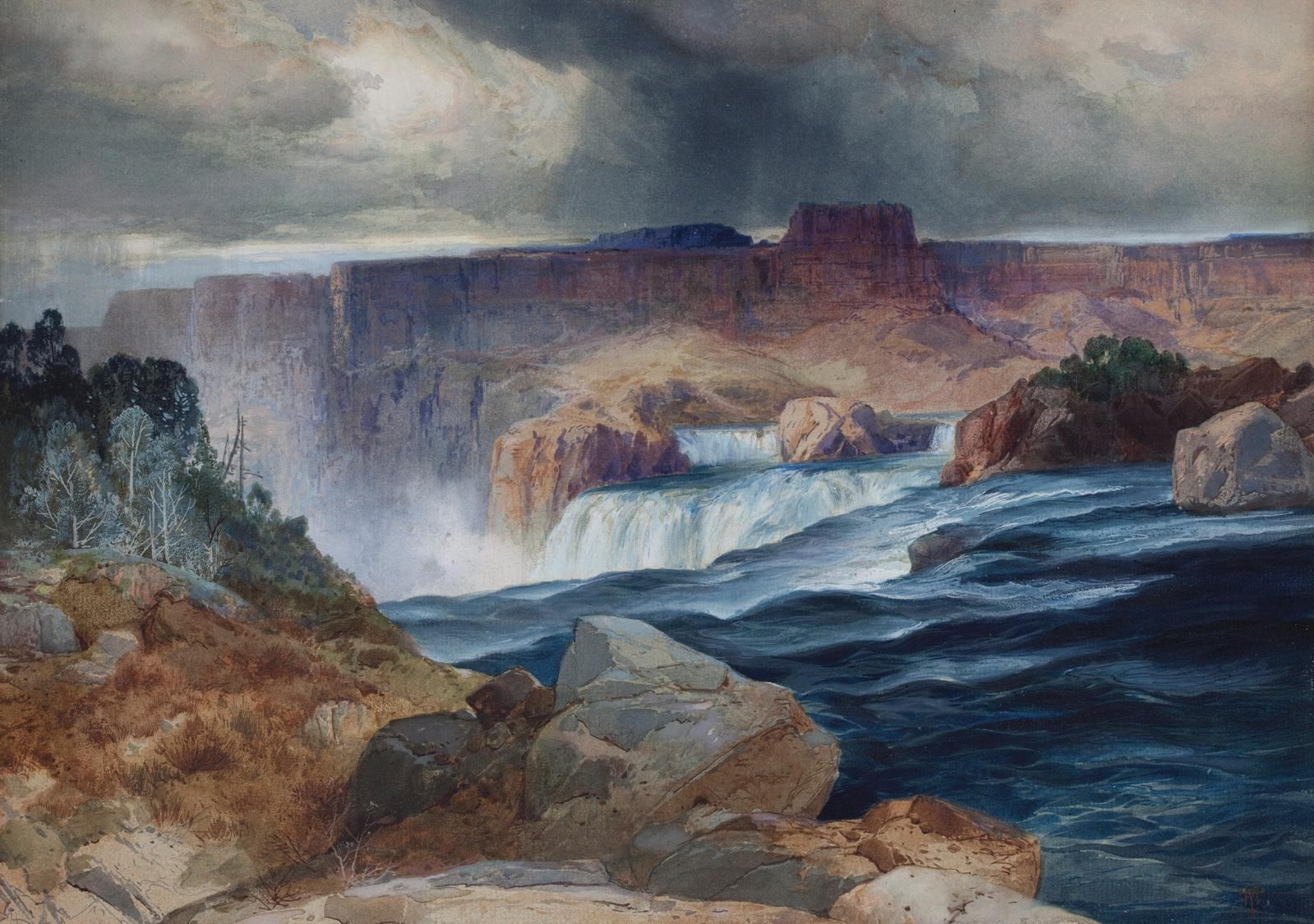
Thomas Moran, Shoshone Falls, Snake River, Idaho, c.1875, Chrysler Museum of Art

As the twentieth century came with the development in cities and industries, the western area of the U.S. faced comprehensive changes. The cowboys and buffalo disappeared, and the open range vanished as well. A more modern lifestyle was introduced to this area. Therefore, the subjects brought up by artists of the period were to recall the "Wild West". Thomas Moran, the painter of western vistas, created the last panoramic canvas of the region, Shoshone Falls on the Snake River. This painting expresses the will of protecting western natural resources; however, after Moran visited the falls, a project for irrigation had ruined the river. With the influence of industrial development, the artistic works in early 20th century inherited the features of the old century. Consequently, the rise of modernism promoted the changes in the Western American Art.

With the election of president Warren G. Harding and the ending of the Depression of 1876, the western U.S. rapidly developed during the 1920s. Modernism started to spread elsewhere, but there were more traditional depictions dominating Western art. The art colonies in California and New Mexico provided artists a place to explore further western American life. Maynard Dixon, an American painter, changed to easel paintings of Indians and landscapes rendered in a nearly realist style from illustrations of the Old West. Paintings focusing on nature and animal were another way in which artists portrayed the wild West. Carl Rungius, who was a nature and animal plein-air painter, is a typical example of this, and he continued recording western life over several decades/. Sculptors also recorded western America in a unique way with views of the Old West to create sculptures of animals, cowboys, Indians, and frontiersmen. At the end of 1920s, the tendency toward portrayals of Indians and romanticized views of their customs declined, as interest in avant-garde topics ideas increased. In the 1930s, the stock market crash affected Americans negatively and inevitably influenced the style of artists during that dark period.

== Artists ==
=== Charles Marion Russell ===
Charles M. Russell
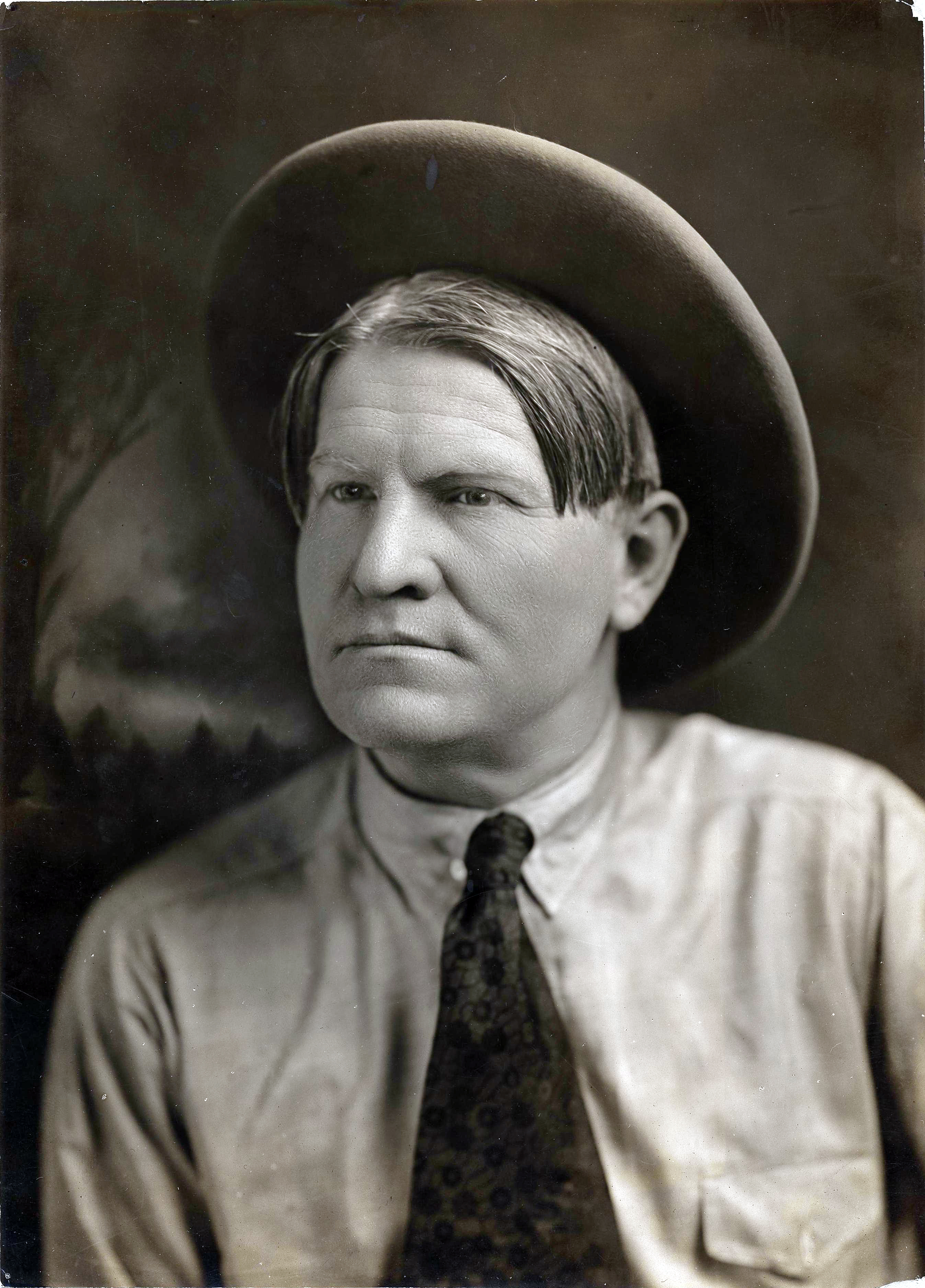
- Russell in 1907
- Born: March 19, 1864; St. Louis, Missouri
- Died: October 24, 1926 (aged 62); Great Falls, Montana
- Known for: Painting, bronze sculpture

Charles Marion Russell, also known as "Kid Russell", was an American artist of the American Old West, who used to be a cowboy on a ranch. That background gave him advantages in his art because he was familiar with the cowboy life and was qualified to record it. Russell was unschooled and self-taught, but he was recognized as a distinguished person in the area of Western Art. He created more than 2000 paintings of cowboys, Indians, and landscapes of the West. During his cowboy career, he was actually not treated as a qualified cowboy but as a storyteller and artist who expressed himself through his art. Even after Russell achieved recognition and acclaim, he remained in the old traditions of the Old West and was devoted to it before the white civilization was imposed upon it.

Russell was born in a big family and was the third of six children. He showed a deep interest in art since his childhood. According to his family, Russell had a native artistic talent. He spent an appreciable amount of time at drawing and modelling. Under the influence of western expansion, the Horace Greeley's slogan "Go West young man" was widespread in Missouri. Therefore, a tendency to go to the West gradually formed among many young people. Living under this environment, Russell inevitably had a dream of adventure in the Old West as well. At the age of sixteen, he went to Montana and worked as a cowboy.

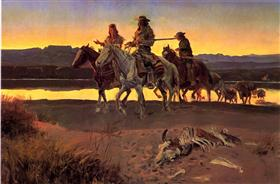
Carson's men

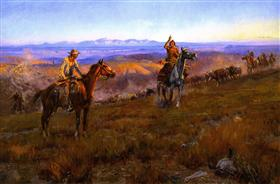
The Toll Collectors, 1913

Russell's artistic works covered a various subjects, containing daily life in the West, historical events, and the traditional activities of the cowboys. The harsh reality and drama on the drive through Montana supplied a documentary artist with material for a lifetime of work. The roundup in Judith Basin during his cowboy experience provided the idea and subjects for the early artistic efforts of Russell, from which he gained fame as an artist. One of the first large oil canvases he attempted was "The Judith Roundup" which probably done in 1885. During the journey through the rough Montana terrain with beef cattle, the cattle herds passed where bands of warring Piegans and Crows had recently finished a grievous fight. The herd was stopped by the warriors, who asked the whites to pay the traditional toll for each head of cattle when they crossed the Crow reservation. One of Russell's famous paintings is related to these incidents, which is known as "The Toll Collectors" painted thirty-one years later in 1913.

Russell's paintings are representative among the artistic works of western American art because he represented the views of the indigenous people in the U.S. instead of the non-native citizens' views. He was famous as a precise documentary artist with an exquisite sense of the West.

=== Frederic Remington ===
Frederic Remington
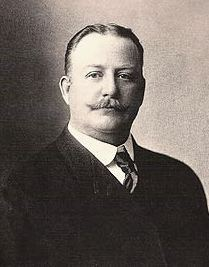
- Born: Frederic Sackrider Remington; October 4, 1861; Canton, New York
- Died: December 26, 1909 (aged 48)

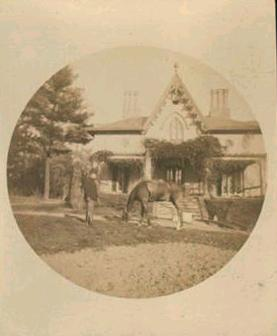
Remington estate 'Endion' in New Rochelle, New York. The Gothic-revival cottage was designed by Alexander J. Davis.

Frederic Sackrider Remington was an American painter who is considered to be one of the most representative artists of Western subjects. His paintings are mostly concentrated on the subjects of western cowboys and Indians at the end of 19th century. He was closely involved in some moments at which the image of the Western American was focused. Remington created over 3000 paintings demonstrating Western subjects in the less than 30 years of his artistic life. To record the traditional lifestyle of the West, Remington devoted his art to the changes of that turned to the drama and conflict which he considered as the essential part of the life of western America. His paintings mainly focus on the hard riding and hard fighting, especially at moment that the action presents the maximum impact. It shows a tendency toward the narrativization of painting, recording the stories and reportage of the West. Remington maintained a sense of tension and drama in his artistic works to show the wild and natural features of the West.

Remington was in a military school when he was young, where he took his first painting lesson. He then attended the art school at Yale University, but he quit after his father died. At nineteen, he had his first trip to Montana and then started his art career in the West. He was recognized as one of the most successful Western illustrators during the end of the nineteenth century and the beginning of the twentieth century. He showed a talent in managing complex compositions, and his artistic works were regarded as modern and outstanding by some critics. In many of his paintings, Remington seemed to focus on the animals and people of the West instead of the landscape. Although Remington was highly regarded at the time, there were some critics who pointed out that he was weak and unconfident with color, which limited the development of his artistic career.

== Selected works ==
Selected works

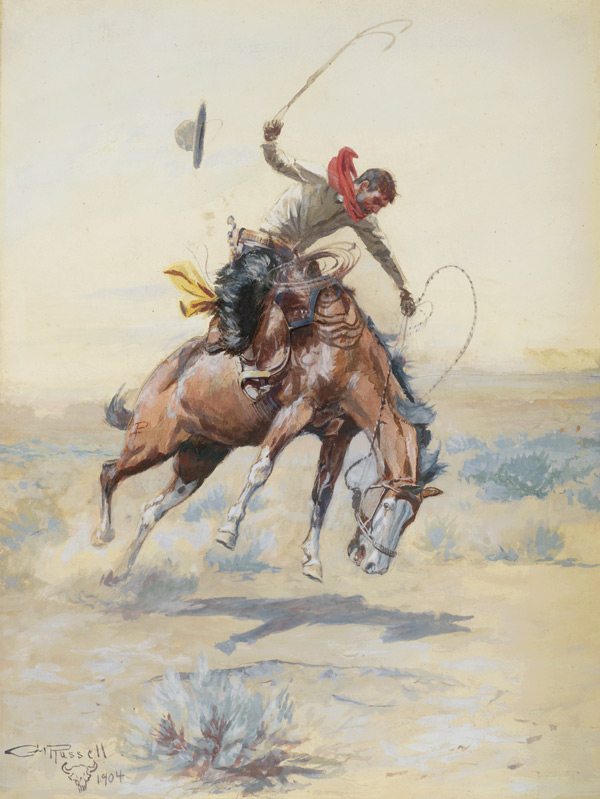
The Bucker, 1904, Watercolor, pencil & gouache on paper, Sid Richardson Museum, Fort Worth, Texas

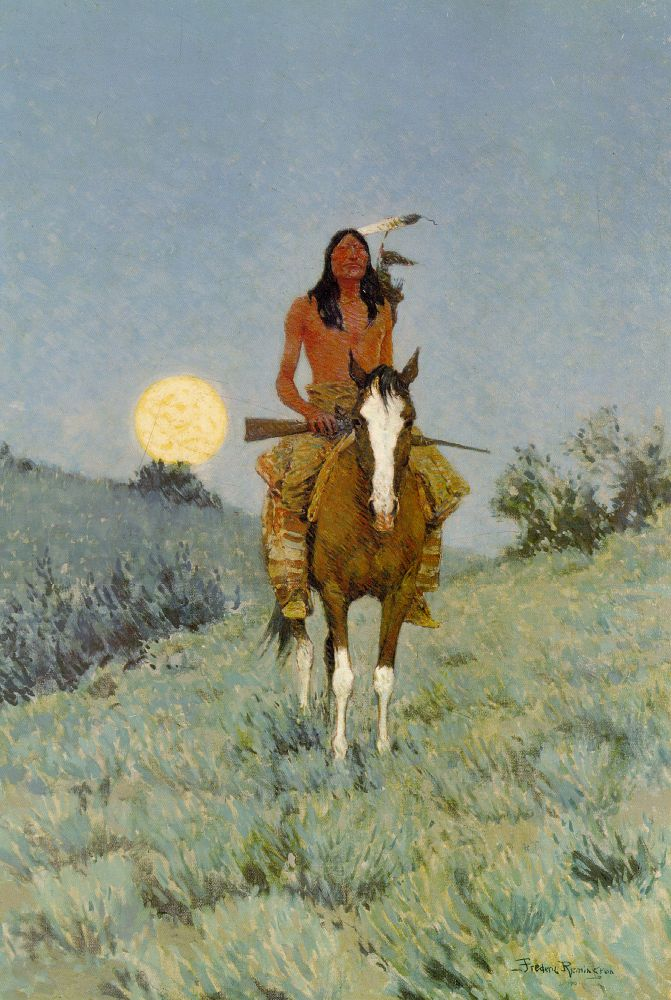
The Outlier

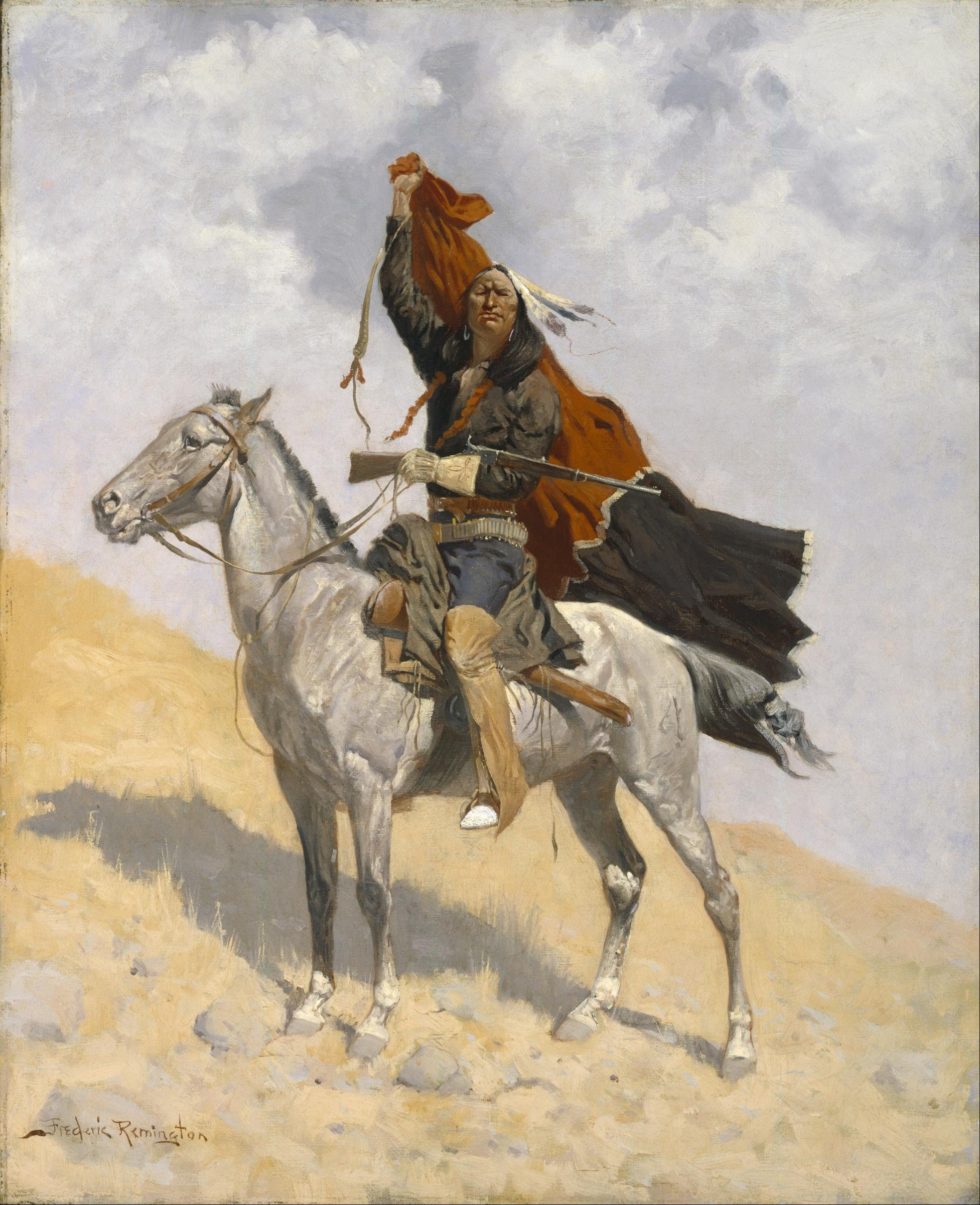
The Blanket Signal, 1894/1898

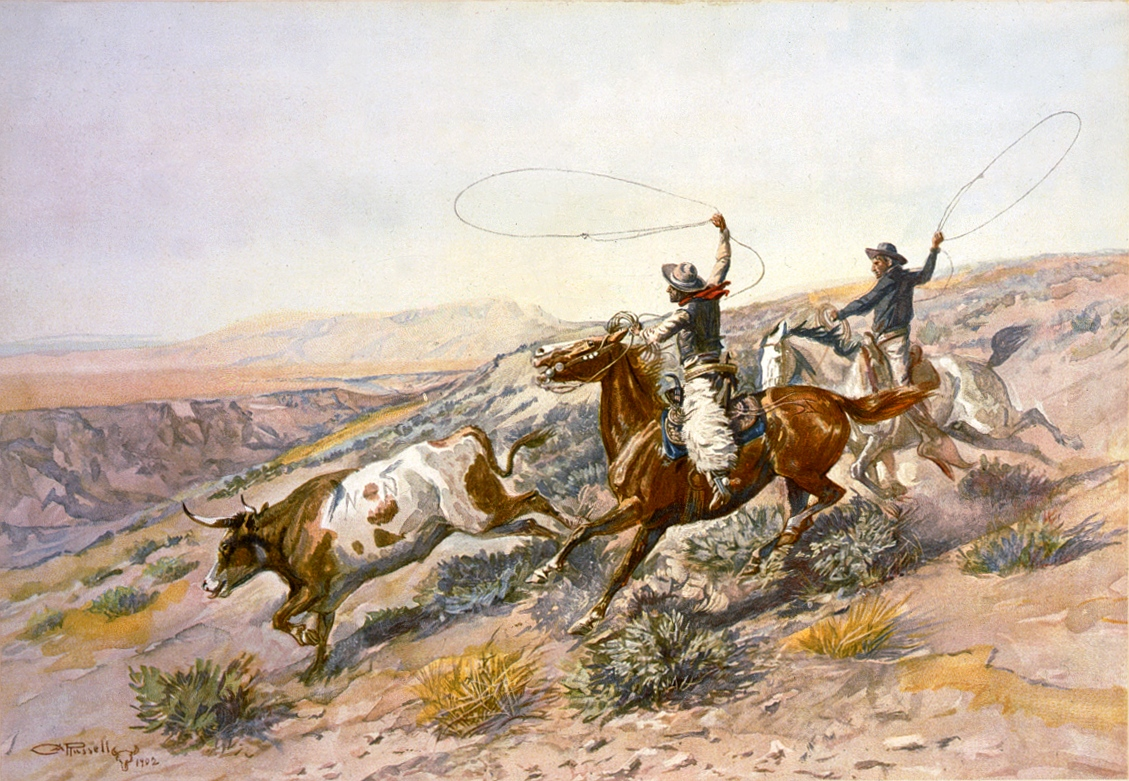
Buccaroos, 1902

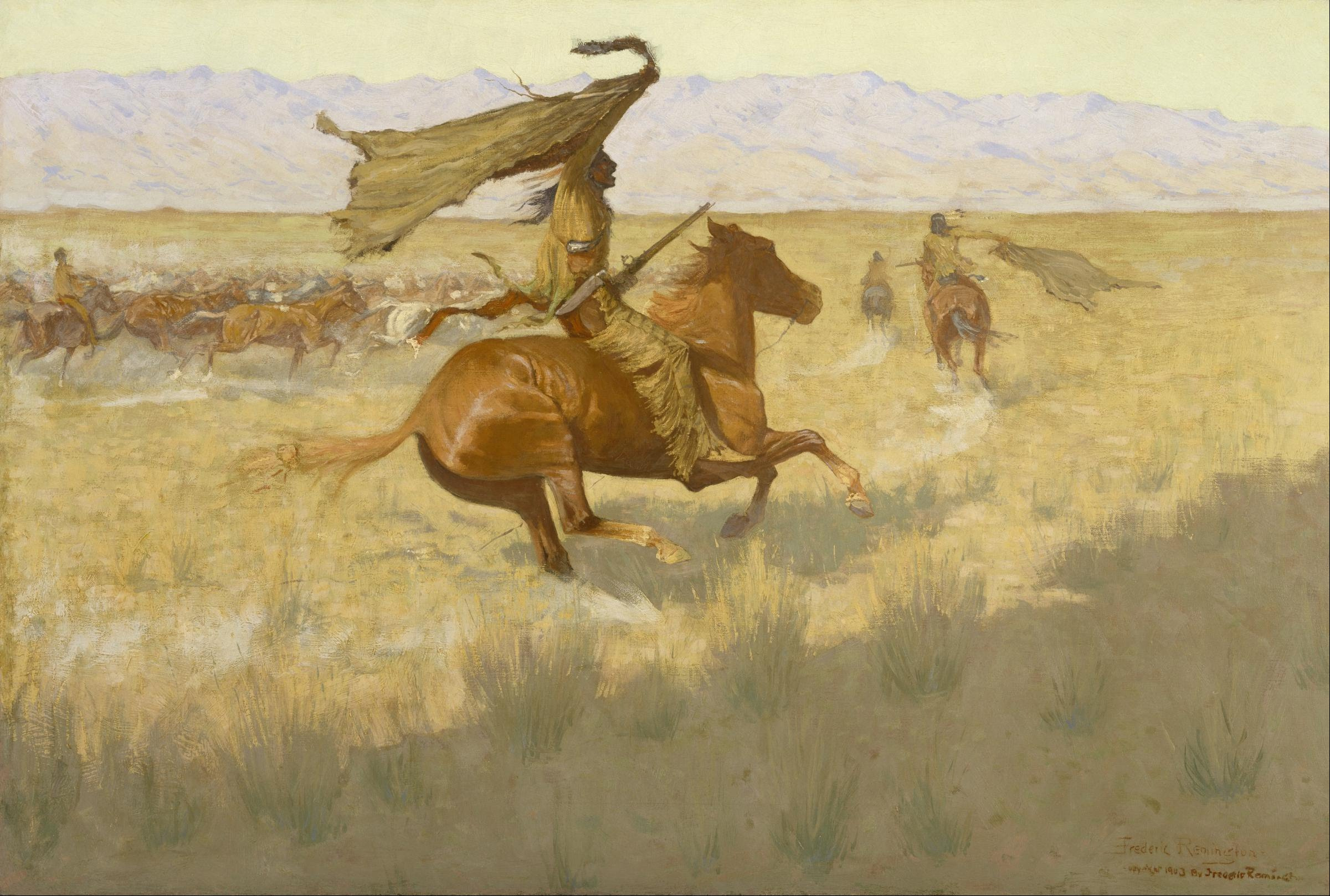
Frederic Sackrider Remington, The Stampede; Horse Thieves, 1909. Museum of Fine Arts, Houston

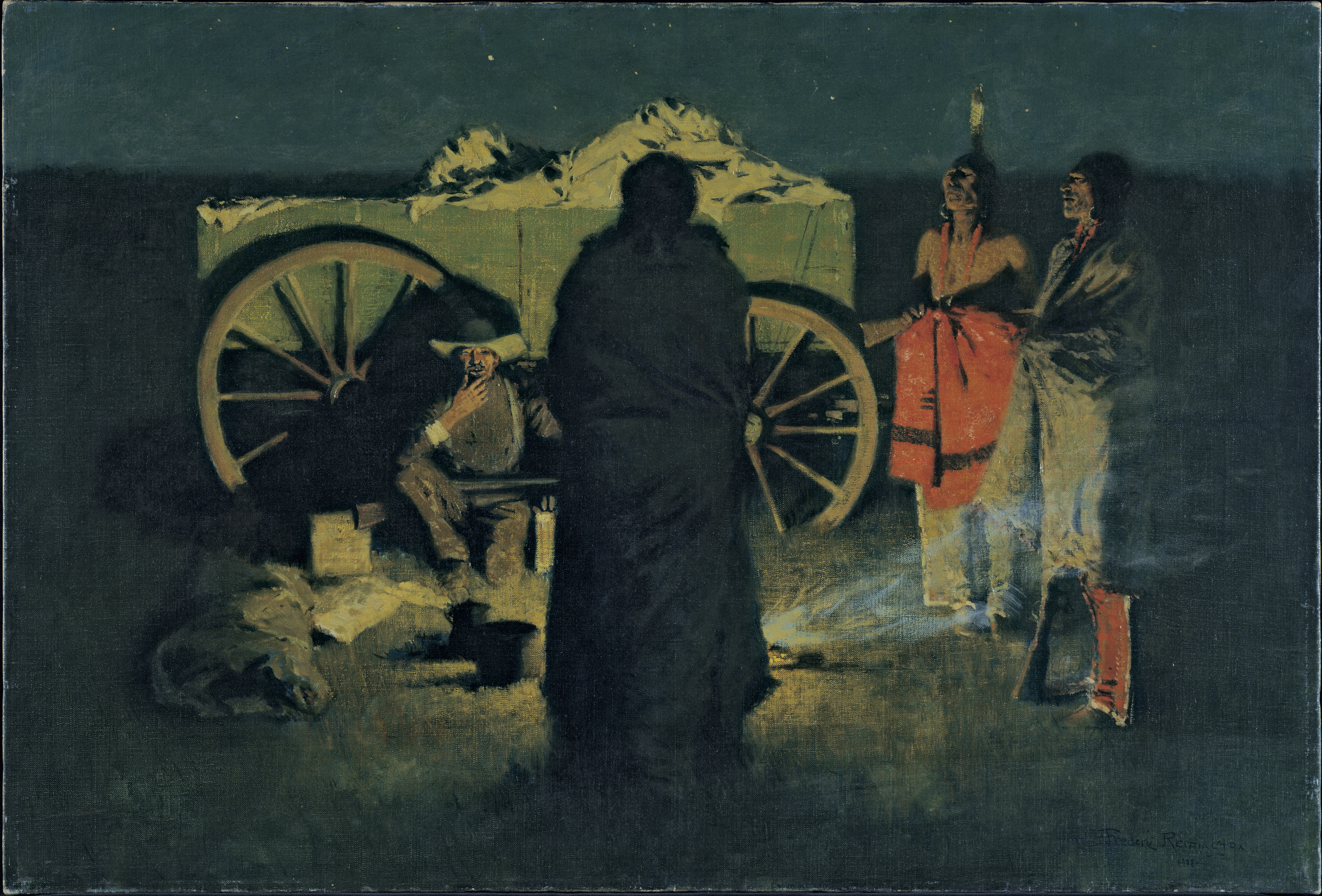
Shotgun Hospitality, 1908, oil on canvas, Hood Museum of Art, Dartmouth College, Hanover, New Hampshire

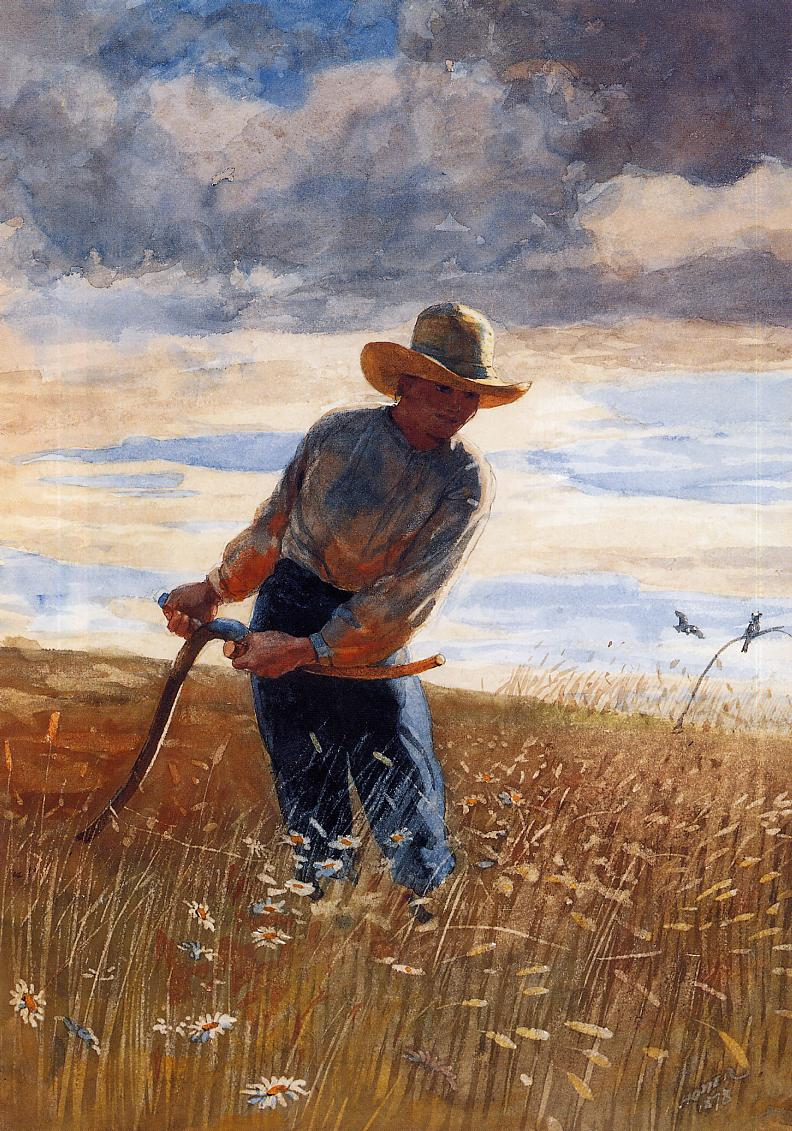
The Reaper, 1878

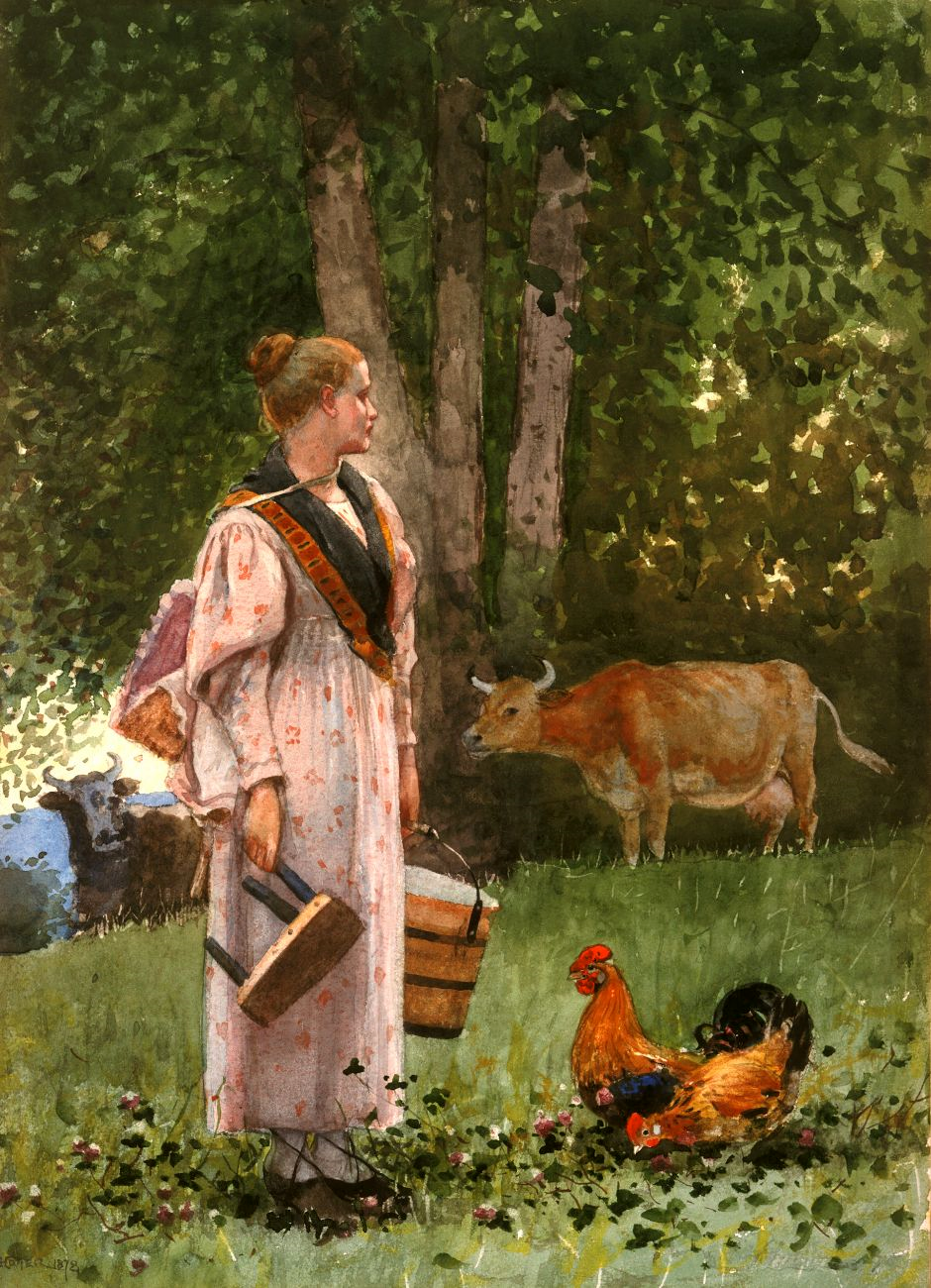
The Milk Maid, 1878

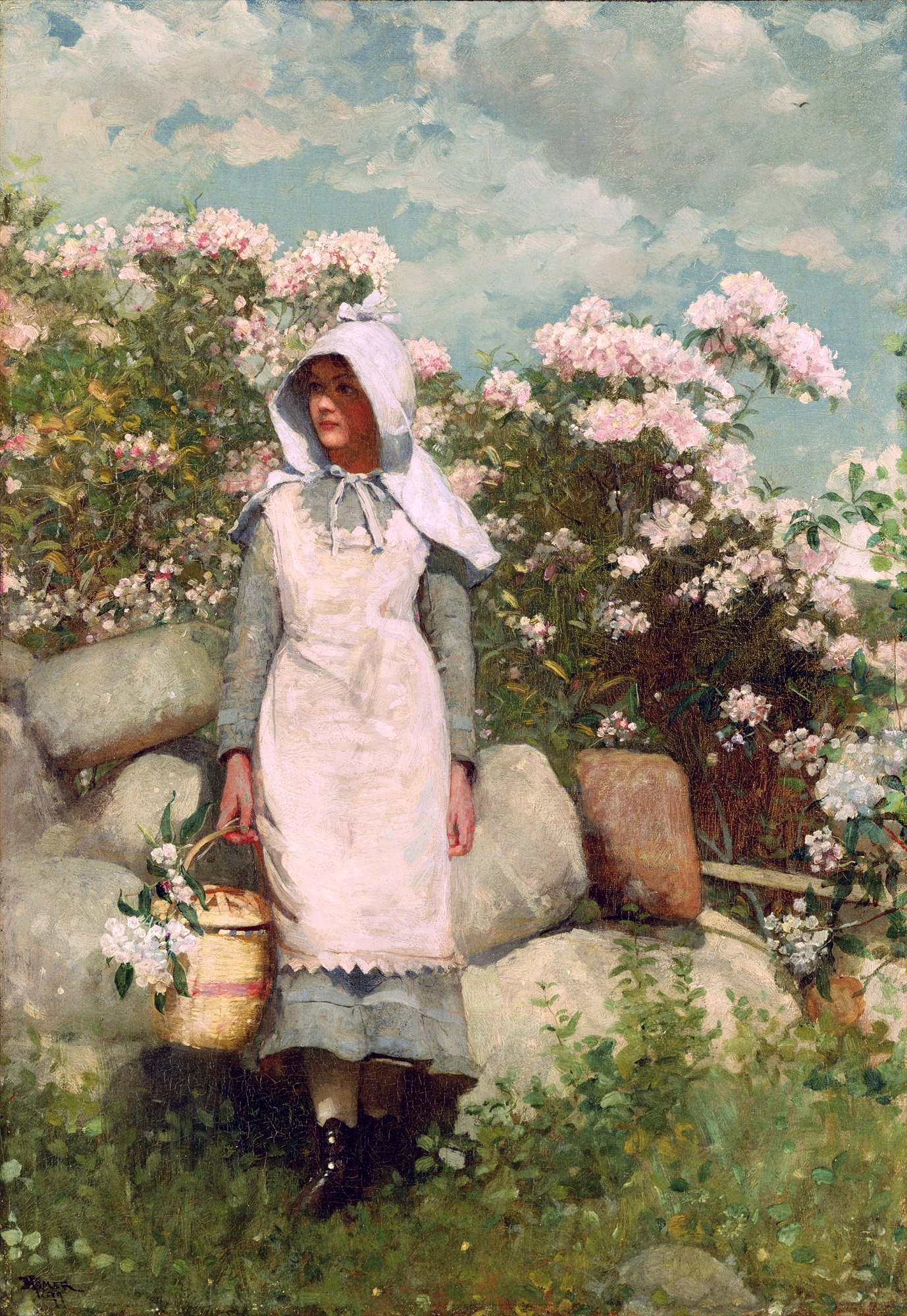
Girl and Laurel, 1879

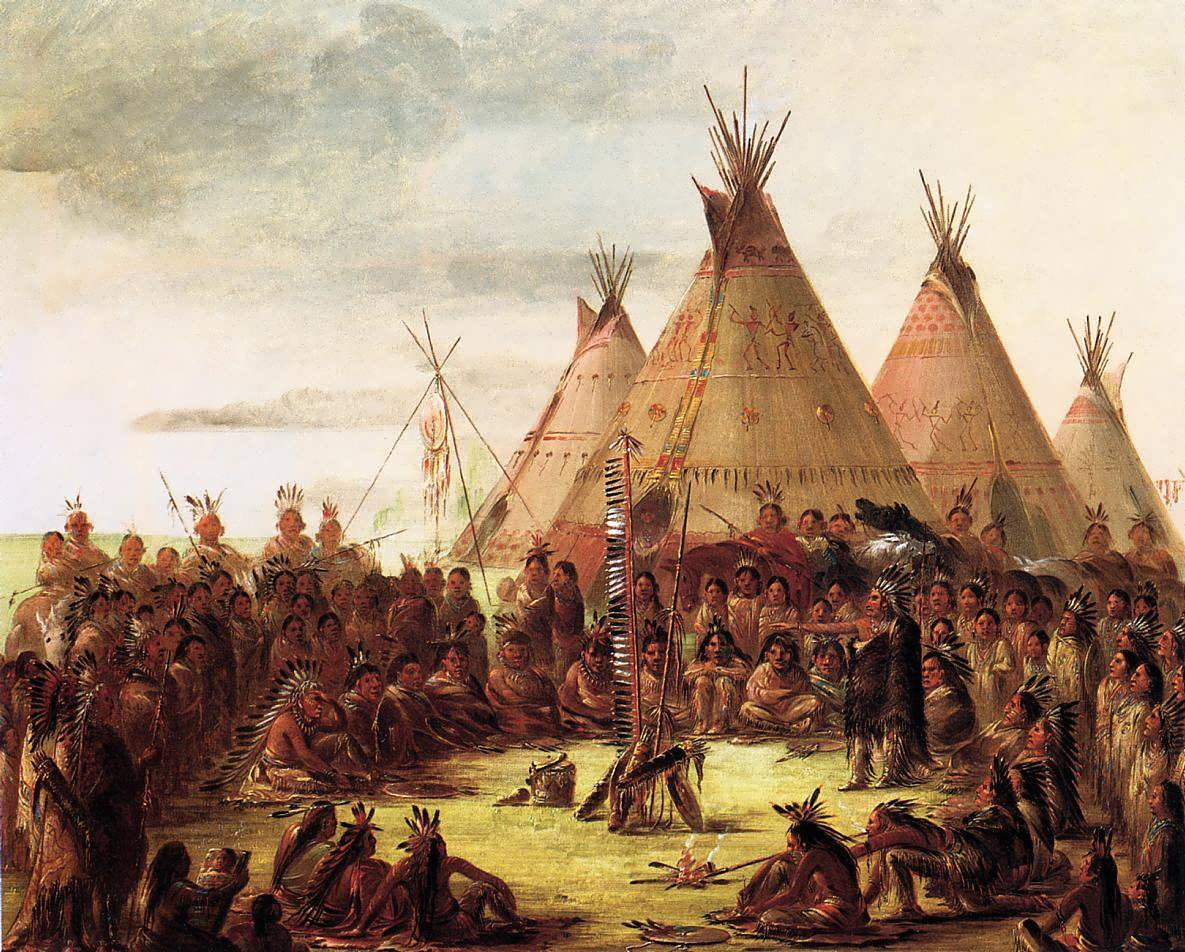
Tipis

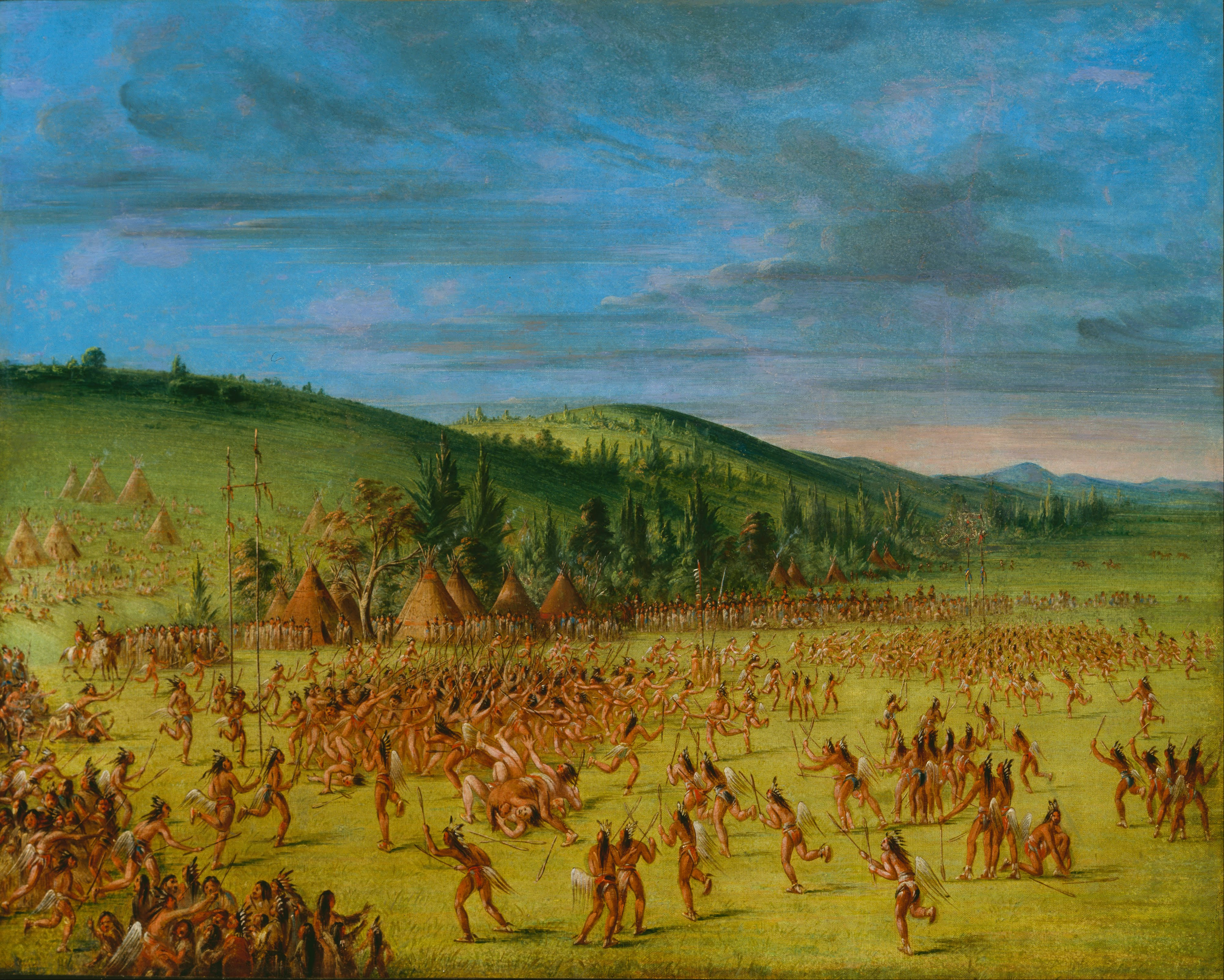
An Indian Ball-Play c. 1846–1850

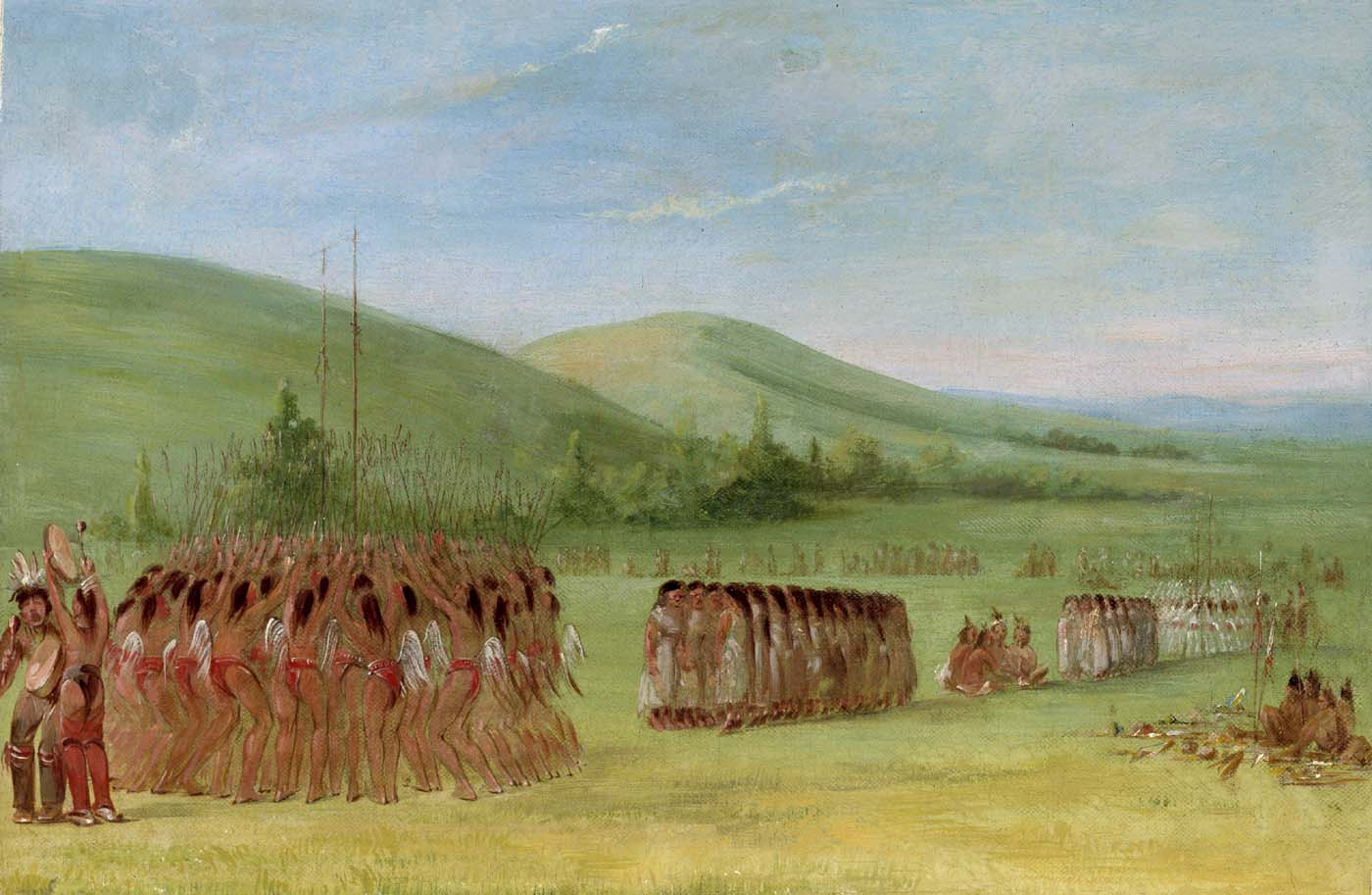
Ball-play Dance 1834

== See also ==
- Cowboy Artists of America – a guild of artists who depict the American West
