= Gichigamiin Indigenous Nations Museum =

Museum in Evanston, Illinois

- Museum logo

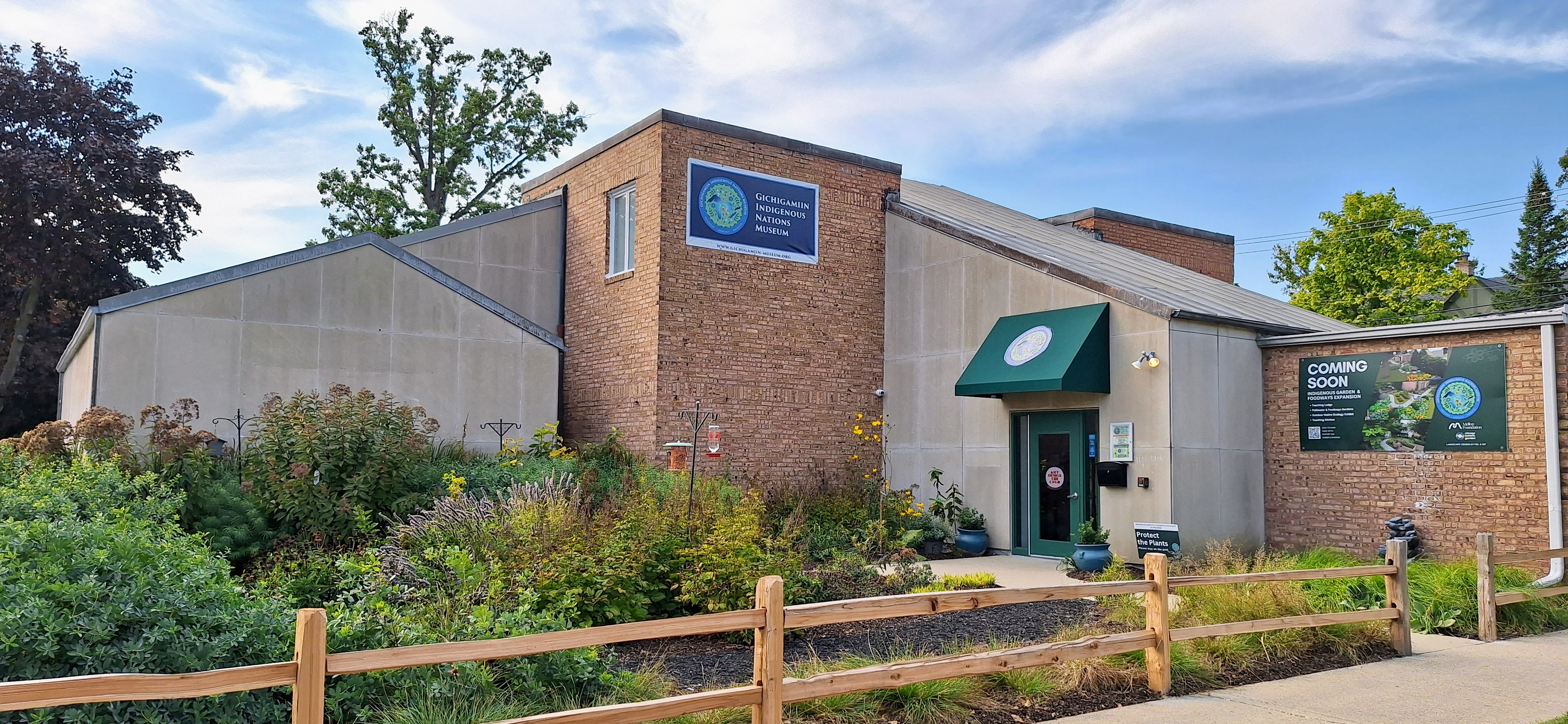
- Established: 1977
- Location: 3001 Central Street; Evanston, Illinois
- Coordinates: 42.0647°N 87.7181°W
- Type: Native American
- Website: gichigamiin-museum.org

The Gichigamiin Indigenous Nations Museum is a museum in Evanston, Illinois that focuses exclusively on the history, culture and arts of North American native peoples. The museum was established as the Mitchell Museum of the American Indian in 1977. In 2024, the museum was renamed and became Native-led, shifting its mission from an overview of U.S. and Canadian Indigenous peoples to a more specific focus on Chicago's Native community and the tribal nations across the Great Lakes region.

The museum's collection of over 10,000 items ranges from the Paleo-Indian period through the present day. Permanent exhibitions depict the Native American cultures of the Woodlands, Plains, Southwest, Northwest Coast and Arctic regions. Special exhibit areas highlight the work of contemporary regional Native artists.

== History ==
The museum was founded in 1977 after the gift of a collection of Native American art and materials by businessman John M. Mitchell and his wife Betty Seabury Mitchell. Mitchell's collection was originally housed within Kendall College. The collection was moved into the former home of the Terra Museum of American Art in 1997, and became an independent nonprofit organization in 2006.

In 2024, the museum underwent a process of consultation with members of the Indigenous community and the wider public, and chose a new name, Gichigamiin Indigenous Nations Museum. Gichigamiin (pronounced Gi-che-gammeen) means Great Lakes in the Ojibwe language and highlights the museum's revised focus on local and regional tribes. The same year, the museum formed a partnership with the Aloha Center, which presents exhibits highlighting Hawaiian and South Pacific culture in the adjacent building at 3009 Central Street.

It is a Core Member of the Chicago Cultural Alliance, a consortium of more than 40 cultural heritage institutions in the Chicago area.

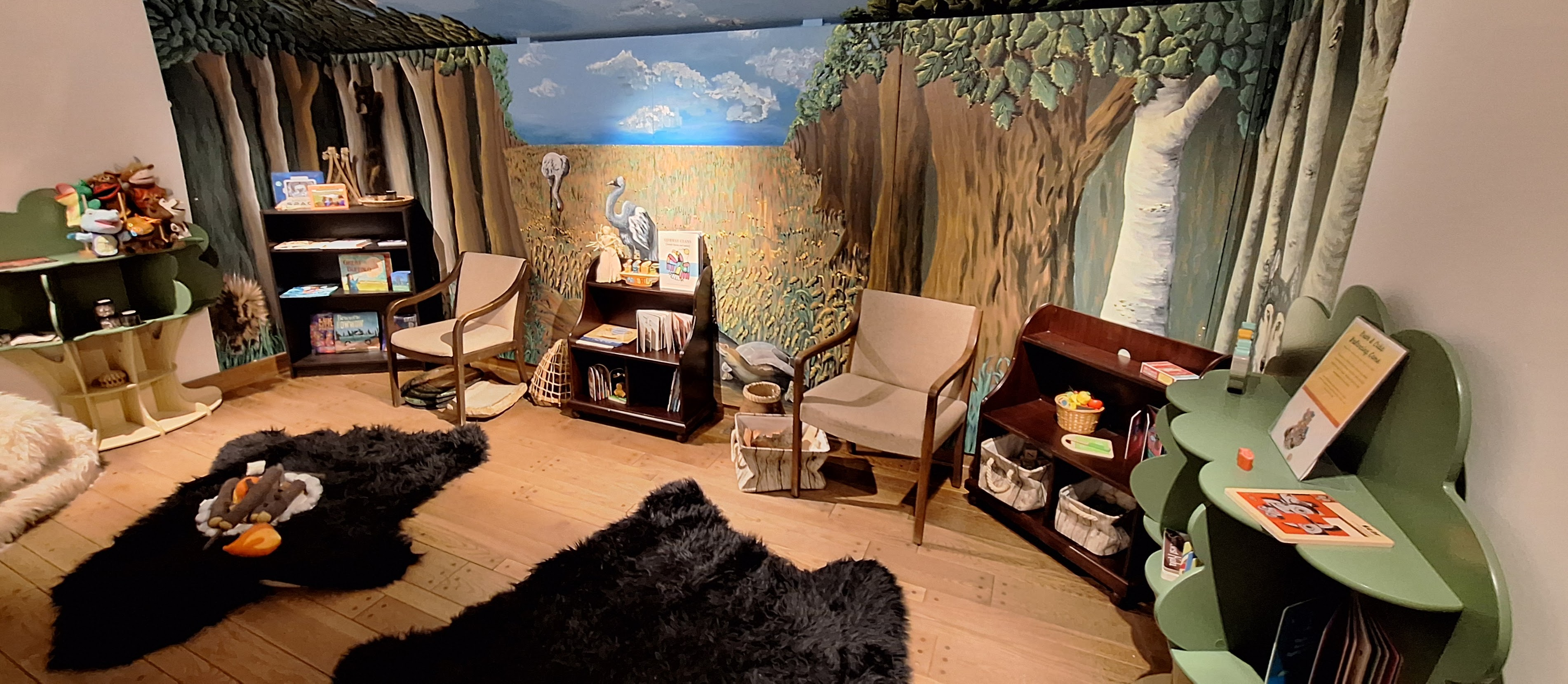
The family zone at the museum, featuring children's books and games

== Permanent galleries ==
The museum's permanent exhibit, A Regional Tour of American Indian Cultures, highlights the art and material culture of the tribes in the United States and Canada. The exhibit is split into galleries based on geographic regions:

- The Woodlands Gallery focuses on the native peoples living east of the Mississippi River, including the Northeast, Southeast and Great Lakes areas. A full-size birchbark canoe is the centerpiece of the exhibit with individual cases exploring fishing, hunting and gathering, wood splint and birchbark containers, and various forms of personal ornament, including glass beads, quillwork and moosehair embroidery.
- The Plains Gallery explores the lifeways of the Native American tribes living in the central part of North America. Moccasins, blanket strips and a variety of carrying bags show the distinctive beadwork designs typical of the Crow, Cheyenne, Blackfoot and Lakota (Sioux).
- The Southwest Gallery illustrates the culture and art of the Pueblo, Navajo and southern Arizona Papago and Tohono O'odham (Pima) peoples. Cases are devoted to Pueblo pottery, the silver and turquoise jewelry of Zuni, Navajo, Hopi and Santo Domingo artists, Kachina dolls including several turn of the century carvings from Acoma and Laguna Pueblos, and Navajo rugs from many of the different early 20th century trading posts.
- The Northwest Coast and Arctic Gallery provides insight into the people living along the Pacific Coast of Washington, Alaska and British Columbia and in the northern reaches of Canada. Prints, baskets, masks and other wooden carvings demonstrate the way Northwest Coast art incorporates family history in its imagery. The wide variety of materials used by the Inuit and Athapascan peoples of the Arctic is shown by the everyday items on exhibit, including several pairs of snow goggles made from caribou hoof, bone and wood, and a full-size early 20th century walrus intestine parka from western Alaska.

== Library and garden ==
The Stanley Golder Library includes a collection of over 3,000 books and periodicals. The library is available for in-house use to visitors. The Indigenous Medicine and Pollinator Garden includes regional foodcrops, promoting the importance of traditional ecological knowledge.

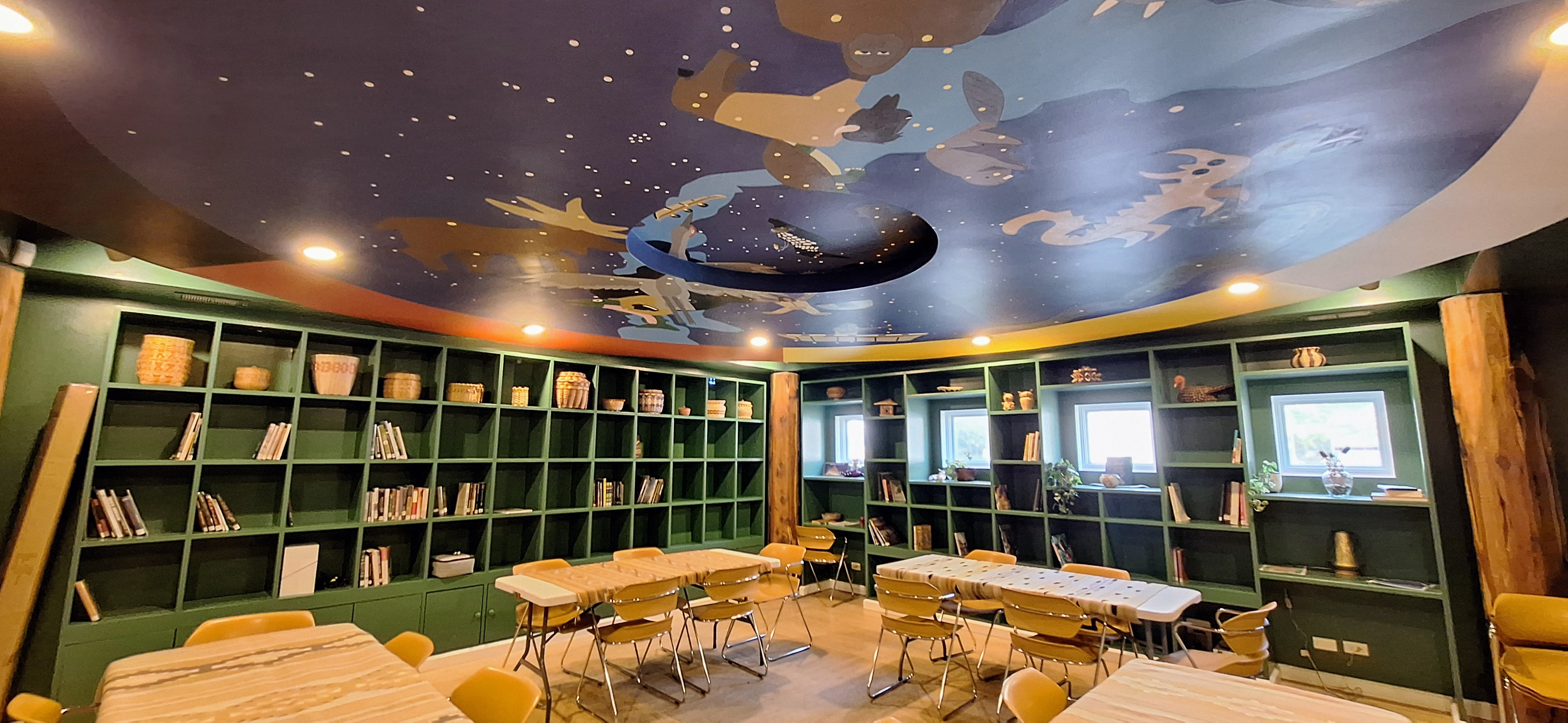
The Stanley Golder Library, featuring a ceiling painted with Potawatomi constellations
