= Narciso Abeyta =

American painter

Narciso P. Abeyta
- Born: Ha So Deh; 1918; Canoncito, New Mexico, U.S.
- Died: June 22, 1998 (aged 79–80)
- Known for: Painting, silversmithing
- Spouse: Sylvia Ann
- Children: 7, including Pablita Abeyta, Tony Abeyta

Narciso "Ciso" Platero Abeyta, or Ha So Deh (1918–1998) was a Navajo painter, silversmith and Navajo code talker. He is known for his colorful paintings depicting Navajo life. His work is in the permanent collection of museums including the Smithsonian National Museum of the American Indian.

== Early life and education ==
Abeyta was born in 1918. He is named after his father, Narciso. His mother was Pablita. He started drawing when he was eleven. He attended the Santa Fe Indian School, starting in 1939. Dorothy Dunn was his teacher. Abeyta was a Golden Gloves boxer. He served in World War II in the United States Army, as a code talker. After he returned from service, he was unable to work for ten years due to his experiences at war. Eventually, he attended the University of New Mexico. He trained under Raymond Jonson.

== Mid-life and career ==
Abeyta was primarily a painter. His paintings document Navajo life, and use brush stroke techniques that are reminiscent of Navajo rugs. He had two known commissions for work as a muralist; a 1934 mural for a social science classroom in Santa Fe, New Mexico and in 1939 for Maisel's Indian Trading Post in Albuquerque, New Mexico. He demonstrated painting at the 1939 San Francisco World's Fair

Abeyta married Sylvia Ann, a Quaker ceramics artist. They had seven children, including artists Tony Abeyta and Pablita Abeyta. The family lived in Gallup, New Mexico.

== Later life and legacy ==
Abeyta died on June 22, 1998, from a cerebral hemorrhage.

His work is held in the collections of the National Gallery of Art, National Museum of the American Indian, and the Museum of New Mexico.

Abeyta's paintings were included the book, Southwest Indian Painting: A Changing Art (1957, University of Arizona Press) by Clara Lee Tanner.

== Major exhibitions ==
- 1994 –Translating Navajo Worlds: the Art of Narciso (Ha-So-De) and Tony Abeyta, Wheelwright Museum of the American Indian, Santa Fe, New Mexico
