= Southwest Art =

- Categories: Art
- Frequency: Monthly
- Company: Peak Media Properties
- Country: United States
- Based in: Golden, Colorado
- Language: English
- Website: www.southwestart.com
- ISSN: 0192-4214

Southwest Art is a magazine published by Peak Media Properties that specializes in fine art depicting art of the American Southwest.

== History and profile ==
Southwest Art was first published in May 1971. Initially, the magazine was based in Houston, Texas. It first dealt with arts in Houston and then its coverage expanded to the broader southwestern United States. The magazine mainly features paintings and textiles, but also digital and other modern creative endeavors. It mostly covers articles about the artists, galleries, and collectors. Sister publications include The Collector’s Guide focusing on the art and galleries of New Mexico.
