= Then Sings My Soul (album) =

Studio album by Ronnie Milsap
- Released: March 10, 2009
- Genre: Country, gospel
- Label: StarSong
- Producer: Ronnie Milsap, Rob Galbraith

Ronnie Milsap chronology
16 Biggest Hits (2007)	Then Sings My Soul (2009)	Country Again (2011)

Then Sings My Soul is a 2009 inspirational double CD album recorded by country music singer Ronnie Milsap. It features several traditional hymns along with Christian-altered hit singles, including Milsap's "What a Difference You've Made in My Life" and Ben E. King's "Stand by Me". It was being marketed by an extensive TV mail order campaign.

== Track listing ==
=== Disc one ===
1. "I'll Fly Away" (Albert E. Brumley) - 3:34
2. "How Great Thou Art" (Stuart K. Hine) - 4:42
3. "Soon and Very Soon" (Andraé Crouch) - 2:27
4. "Farther Along" (Jesse Randall Baxter) - 3:53
5. "Amazing Grace" (Traditional) - 4:56
6. "Stand by Me" (Ben E. King, Jerry Leiber, Mike Stoller) - 3:52
7. "Up to Zion" (Noreen Crayton, Greg Tomquist) - 2:48
8. "World of Wonder" (James Darrell Scott) - 3:42
9. "In the Garden" (Traditional) - 4:04
10. "Just a Closer Walk with Thee" (Traditional) - 3:16
11. "Peace in the Valley" (Rev. Thomas A. Dorsey) - 3:31
12. "Have Thine Own Way" (Traditional) - 3:14

=== Disc two ===
1. "Swing Down Chariot" - 2:51
2. "Precious Memories" - 3:53
3. "Rock of Ages" (Traditional) - 2:55
4. "People Get Ready" - 3:19
5. "Softly and Tenderly" (Traditional) - 3:19
6. "What a Friend We Have in Jesus" (Traditional) - 3:40
7. "What a Difference You've Made in My Life" - 3:26
8. "Jesus Was All I Had" (Donnie Fritts) - 3:06
9. "It is No Secret" (Stuart Hamblen) - 3:42
10. "The Old Rugged Cross" (Traditional) - 3:21
11. "Holy, Holy, Holy" (Traditional) - 3:29
12. "The Lord's Prayer" (Albert Hay Malotte) - 2:49

== Personnel ==
- Ronnie Milsap – lead vocals, Fender Rhodes, rhythm arrangements
- Shane Keister – Fender Rhodes, organ, synthesizers
- Catherine Styron Marx – acoustic piano, Fender Rhodes, rhythm arrangements
- Jamie Brantley – acoustic guitar, electric guitars
- Mark Casstevens – acoustic guitar
- Steve Gibson – electric guitars
- Kerry Marx – acoustic guitar
- Larry Paxton – bass
- Lonnie Wilson – drums
- Rob Galbraith – rhythm arrangements
- Carol Tomquist – rhythm arrangements
- Noreen Crayton – backing vocals, vocal arrangements
- Bruce Dees – backing vocals, vocal arrangements
- Kevin Durham – backing vocals
- Jon Mark Ivey – backing vocals
- Louis Dean Nunley – backing vocals
- Lisa Silver – backing vocals
- Kira Small – backing vocals
- Russell Terrell – backing vocals
- Bergen White – backing vocals, vocal arrangements

=== Production ===
- Mandy Arola – A&R
- Jamie Neeck – A&R
- Rob Galbraith – producer
- Ronnie Milsap – producer
- Mark Capps – engineer
- Mark Lambert – engineer, overdub recording, mixing
- Robert Hadley – mastering
- Doug Sax – mastering
- The Mastering Lab (Ojai, California) – mastering location
- Andy Norris – design
- Jan Cook – art direction, photography direction
- Tim Frank – photography direction
- Scott Greenwalt – photography
- Alyson Reeves – photography
- Linda Hill – stylist
- Tania Staps – grooming

== Chart performance ==
The album peaked at #19 on the Billboard Top Country Albums chart, #8 on the Billboard Top Christian Albums chart, and #127 on the Billboard 200.

Chart (2009)	Peak position
U.S. Billboard Top Christian Albums	8
U.S. Billboard Top Country Albums	19
U.S. Billboard 200	127

== Awards ==
In 2010, the album was nominated for a Dove Award for Country Album of the Year at the 41st GMA Dove Awards.
