= New Mexico State Fair =

Annual state fair in Albuquerque, NM

Coordinates: 35°4′58.5″N 106°34′29.1″W

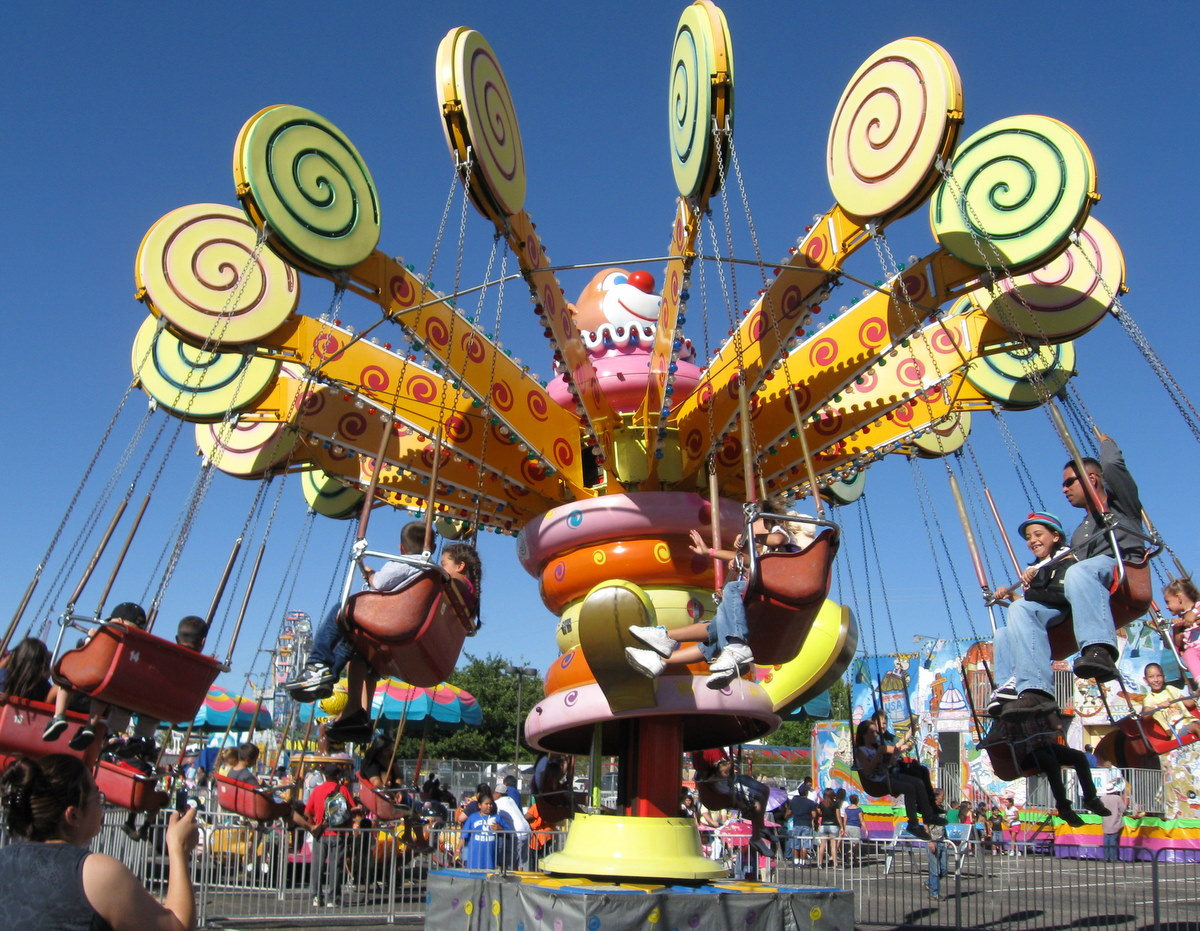
- New Mexico State Fair in 2010
- Genre: State fair
- Dates: 09–19 September 2027.
- Locations: Expo New Mexico; 300 San Pedro NE; Albuquerque, NM 87108; United States
- Years active: 1881–1910 (Territorial Fair); 1911–1916, 1938–1941, 1945–2019, 2021– (State Fair)
- Attendance: 475,318 (2022)
- Website: Official website

The New Mexico State Fair is an annual state fair held in September at Expo New Mexico (formerly the New Mexico State Fairgrounds) in the city of Albuquerque, New Mexico. The event features concerts, competitions, rodeos, carnival rides, games, farm animals, horses, agriculture, art of the American Southwest, New Mexican cuisine, and New Mexico music. The Tingley Coliseum is on the fairgrounds.

== History ==
The fair was first held in October 1881 under the direction of Elias S. Stover. Originally referred to as the territorial fair, it became a state fair in 1911 in anticipation of New Mexico's upcoming statehood. The original fairgrounds, also known as Traction Park, were southwest of Old Town Plaza and were promoted as a year-round destination by the Albuquerque streetcar company in order to boost ridership on their line. In 1917, the fair was canceled and replaced with a "great patriotic demonstration" marking the recent U.S. entry into World War I. Subsequently, the State Fair was not held for several years.

The fair was reinstated in 1938 at its current location on Central Avenue in the International District. The new fairgrounds were built in 1936–38 with Works Progress Administration funding which was secured in part due to the efforts of Governor Clyde Tingley. Leon Harms, formerly the founder of the Marion County Fair in Kansas, laid out the grounds and managed the fair from its inception until 1958. The first state fair in 1938 attracted about 64,000 visitors. By the 1960s, attendance had grown to over 500,000 visitors annually, and the grounds included "83 structures of varying sizes". The fair was originally held in October but was moved up to mid-September in 1960 in hopes of having better weather.

World War II interrupted the fair from 1942 to 1944, and it resumed in 1945, when it was uninterrupted for the next 75 years until 2020. In 2020, the fair had to be cancelled due to the ongoing COVID-19 pandemic. In August 2021, the Governor's office announced the state fair would require proof of vaccination for attendance, with some exceptions for religious or medical reasons.

The 2020 State Fair was canceled due to the ongoing COVID-19 pandemic. When it reopened in 2021, it saw record low attendance due to strict restrictions. In 2022, attendance was back to normal due to state restrictions being lifted.

== Grounds ==
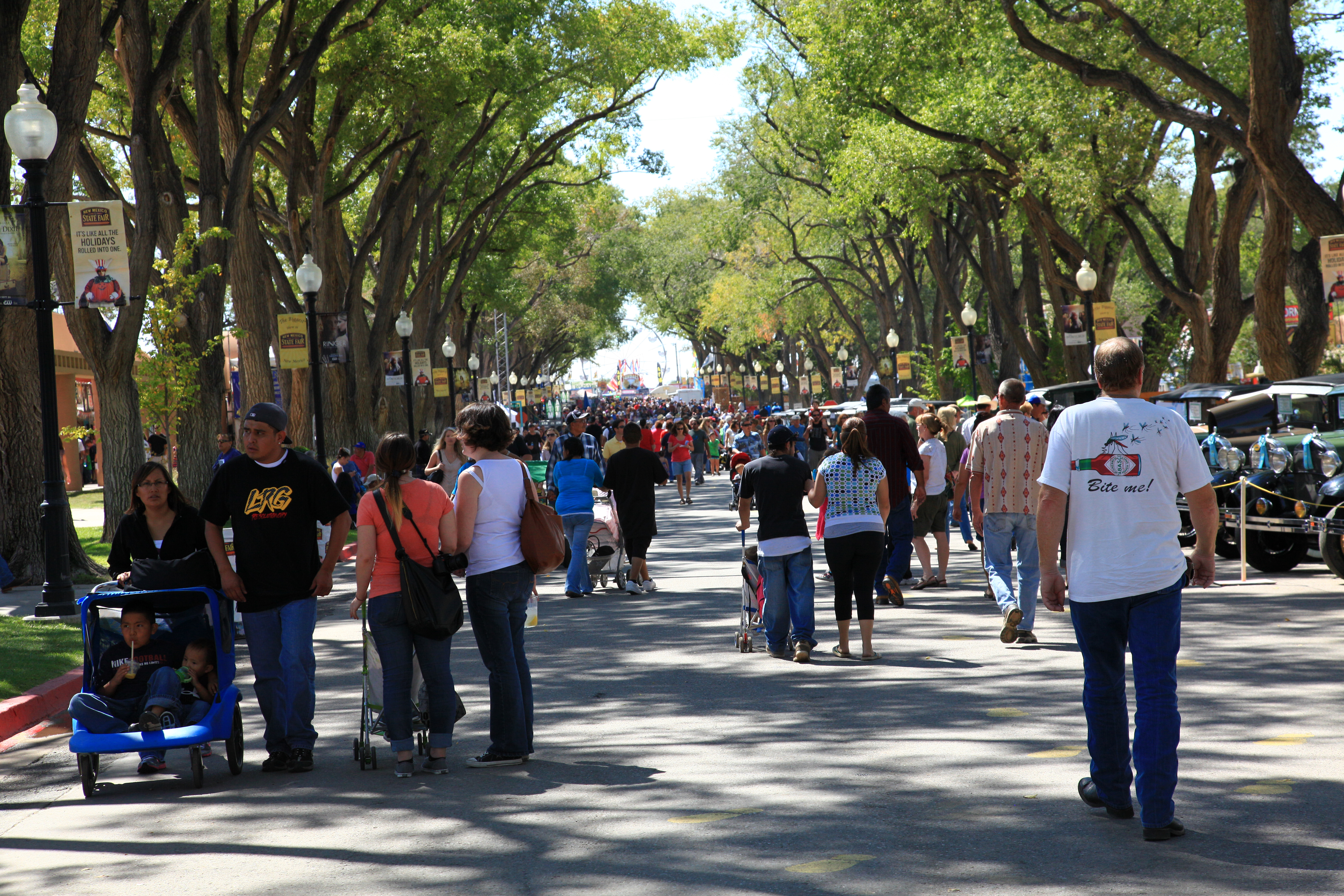
The fairgrounds in 2011

The New Mexico State Fairgrounds are located in eastern Albuquerque between Central Avenue, Lomas Boulevard, San Pedro Drive, and Louisiana Boulevard, and cover approximately 210 acres (85 ha). The facilities have been branded as "Expo New Mexico" since 2003.

The original adobe fair buildings were built by the WPA between 1936 and the early 1940s. Surviving buildings from this period include the Agricultural Building, Fine Arts Building, Horse Barn, and Cattle Barn. The Agricultural Building was listed on the New Mexico State Register of Cultural Properties in 1988. Tingley Coliseum, an 11,800-seat indoor arena, opened in 1957.

Expo New Mexico is the site of New Mexico's Merci Train boxcar, which was a gift from France in 1949. The boxcars were filled with gifts and distributed to each of the 48 U.S. states at the time, along with a 49th car that was shared by Hawaii and the District of Columbia.

Security and law enforcement are handled by the New Mexico State Police, the Federal Bureau of Investigation, the Albuquerque Police, and the Bernalillo County Sheriff's Office, along with private security guards.
