= Precious Memories (hymn) =

Traditional gospel song

"Precious Memories" is a traditional gospel song credited to J. B. F. Wright in 1925. Wright was born in Tennessee on February 21, 1877. The song has been performed by a wide variety of famous recording artists, including Tammy Wynette, Bill Monroe, Rosetta Tharpe, Johnny Cash, Willie Nelson, Alan Jackson, Emmylou Harris, Daniel O'Donnell, Gerry Rafferty, the Edwin Hawkins Singers, a duet by George Jones and Patti Page, Jim Reeves, Bob Dylan, Waylon Jennings, J. J. Cale, and James Blackwood's quartet.

Waylon Jennings recorded the song for the closing act of his 1976-album, Are You Ready for the Country and is incorrectly along with Ken Mansfield given co-writing credits when neither played any role in writing the song.

Dolly Parton recorded the song on her 1999 Dollywood-exclusive album benefitting the Dollywood Foundation, Precious Memories. Her sister, Stella Parton, recorded the song for her gospel album Appalachian Gospel.

A cover by The Stanley Brothers can be heard on Rick Grimes' (Andrew Lincoln) radio at the beginning of The Walking Dead fourth-season premiere episode, "30 Days Without An Accident". Susan Raye's cover was in the opening and closing credits sequences of Paul Schrader's 1979 crime drama, Hardcore.

An a cappella version was recorded by "The Freedom Singers" from Boston Church of Christ in 1988.

A version by Sister Rosetta Tharpe was played in the opening credits to the 1990 film To Sleep with Anger.

Aretha Franklin recorded a live version of the song for her album Amazing Grace (1972) and Ronnie Milsap for his album Then Sings My Soul (2009). In June 2026, CBS News included Aretha Franklin's rendition of the song in its list of the 250 essential American songs of the past 250 years.
