= Pablita Abeyta =

Navajo sculptor and activist (1953–2017)

- Born: Ta-Nez-Bah; July 20, 1953; Gallup, New Mexico
- Died: January 31, 2017 (aged 63); Washington, D.C.
- Citizenship: Navajo and United States
- Occupations: Activist, sculptor
- Father: Narciso Abeyta

Pablita Abeyta (Diné name: Ta-Nez-Bah; July 20, 1953 – January 31, 2017) was a Navajo activist and sculptor born in Gallup, New Mexico, United States. She is the eldest daughter of Sylvia Ann (Shipley) Abeyta and artist Narciso Abeyta. She was named for her grandmother and her name Navajo name translates to "One Who Completes a Circle." Her family was originally from the Cañoncito ("small canyon" in Spanish) Band of the Navajo Reservation in New Mexico, located west of Albuquerque. In 2000 the reservation decided to change its name to To'Hajiilee ("drawing up water from a natural well" in Navajo).

Abeyta earned a Master's in Public Affairs from the University of New Mexico and "worked as a lobbyist for the Navajo Nation in Washington, D.C."

== Early life ==
Pablita Abeyta was born in Gallup, New Mexico on July 20, 1953. Both her parents were artists; her father was Narciso Abeyta and her mother was Sylvia Ann (Shipley) Abeyta. Abeyta was one of seven children. Each child is artistically skilled, in skills ranging from weaving or creating sculptures and painting. Each child was given a Navajo middle name, with the goal of keeping the children connected to their Native American heritage. Abeyta's Navajo name, "Ta-Nez-Bah," translates as "One Who Completes a Circle."

== Career ==
=== Activism ===
Abeyta earned her Master of Public Affairs from the University of New Mexico in 1983. After earning her degree, she became a lobbyist for the Navajo Nation Washington, D.C. office. As a lobbyist for the Navajo, she coordinated a national effort to secure the passing of amendments related to Native peoples such as the Safe Drinking Water Act, Clean Water Act, and the Superfund act. From 1986 to 1988, Abeyta was a legislative assistant for Ben Nighthorse Campbell, a Democrat in the House of Representatives at this time. She left Campbell's office in 1988 to join the Bureau of Indian Affairs. In 1991, she became a congressional liaison for the National Museum of the American Indian (NMAI). At NMAI she monitored the planned museum's funding and participated in obtaining funding for the Smithsonian Institution, NMAI'S organizational parent. She had also worked in developing proposals related to the cultural repatriation. She had also served as the special assistant to the director of the museum in the office of Government affairs until retiring in 2011. She served as a liaison with fundraising for the museum, and also coordinated the attendance of tribal leaders at opening ceremonies as a member of the Native Nations procession team. While at NMAI, she received numerous awards, including Employee of the Year, an award which is now named in her honor.

=== Art ===
As an artist, Abeyta created sculptures that are described as "smooth, round and sensuous." Around the time that she moved to Washington, D.C. to work with Congressman Campbell, her sister gave her a kiln. Abeyta began experimenting with clay sculpture and now Senator Campbell talked her into showing her art at a gallery in Colorado. Her work is held in numerous private and public collections, including those of John McCain, Daniel Inouye, and the National Museum of Natural History. Abeyta's first piece to be auctioned came after her death in 2017. Her "untitled, two corn maidens" was auctioned at Cowan's Cincinnati 2020. A sculptural figure of a woman she created circa 1995 and sold at the Southwest Association for Indian Art's Santa Fe Indian market was donated to NAMI in 2008.
