= Independent (New Mexico newspaper) =

Gallup Independent
- "The Truth Well Told"
- Type: Daily newspaper
- Owner: Gallup Independent Co.
- Founder: W.H. Hanns
- Publisher: Bob Zollinger
- Managing editor: Christina Tsosie
- Founded: 1911
- Ceased publication: January 2026
- Language: English
- Headquarters: 500 N. 9th Street; Gallup, New Mexico
- Circulation: 5,000
- Website: gallupindependent.com

Independent, formerly The Gallup Independent, was a daily newspaper published in Gallup, New Mexico, from 1911 to 2026.

== History ==
In 1911, W.H. Hanns published the first edition of the weekly Gallup Independent in Gallup, New Mexico. In 1914, the paper was sued for libel by two Republican candidates running for the state house, each seeking $5,000 in damages. A judge dismissed the case, but award the plaintiffs $5 to cover legal costs. In 1915, Hanns leased a printing plant and began publishing the Carbon City News, a successor to the McKinley County Republican.

In 1922, Hanns was arrested and jailed after being charged with criminal libel. This was in relation to an article Hanns published allegedly two on-duty soldiers sexually assaulted a woman. Hanns was released on bond, paid for by George Byers, rival publisher of the Gallup Herald. In 1923, W.V. Bahmer purchased a control interest in the business and folded the News while the Independent became a semi-weekly.

In 1924, Ed. M. Vesslle was hired as manager. Three years later The Gallup Independent Publishing Co. was charted. Vesslle published the paper until 1929, when it was purchased by Frank Farley, Sunday editor at the Rocky Mountain News. In 1930, Farley bought the Alamosa Courier and moved back to Colorado to manage it. At that time he handed over the Independent to managing editor Vincent J. Jaeger while maintaining an interest.

In 1931, Col. Clyde Earl Ely, former owner of the Deming Headlight, sold the Gallup Herald to the Independent and it ceased. The Independent entered receivership and in 1936 was sold at court-ordered auction to Vincent J. Jaeger and C.M. Carter. In 1939, A.W. Barnes bought the paper from the two. In 1952, Barnes sold the paper to Lincoln O'Brien, owner of the Las Vegas Optic, Tucumcari Daily News, and Farmington Daily Times. A month later the New Mexico Press Association, which Barnes was elected president of twice, awarded him honorary lifetime membership.

In 1955, Wallace Leach bought the majority stock in the Independent and became publisher. He joined O'Brien as co-owner. In 1958, the Independent purchased a warehouse from the Gallup Oil Company. That same year, Wallace exited the business. In 1964, Lincoln O'Brien sold the paper to John K. Zollinger. In 1968, Zollinger's only daughter died at age 15 after collapsing during gym class. In 1984, the Independent announced plans to construct a $1.38 million printing plant. Around that time, Zollinger handed over the day-to-day operations to his son, Robert "Bob" Zollinger, and was involved in the Independent until 2007 when died. In January 2026, publisher Bob Zollinger announced the paper will cease publication after failed attempts to sell it.

== Bob Zollinger Lawsuits ==
=== "Mexican Mafia" ===
In May 1987, Gallup city councilman Harry Mendoza sued the Independent for defamation, and sought $1 million in damages. The lawsuit was in response to an opinion column publisher in the paper that claimed the city council had been taken over by the "Mexican Mafia." Three of the five city council members were Hispanic at that time. The paper claimed the term was intended to be satirical and humorous. The paper asked the courts for the lawsuit to be dismissed. In August 1988, an appeals court dismissed Mendoza's libel suit.

=== Public records ===
In October 1987, Bob Zollinger sued the City of Gallup in an attempt to obtain information from public utility records. This followed after the city council voted 3-2 twice not to release records related to its electric utility and its water and sanitation departments. A month later a judge ordered the city to release its utility records, including its mailing list and payment records.

=== Shirley court coverage ===
In May 1991, a prosecuting attorney request a restraining order to bar the Independent from publishing stories about the upcoming drunk-driving trail of state Rep. Albert Shirley. This was after a mistrial was declared when an unbiased jury could not be found. Publisher Bob Zollinger said he would not abided by that order if it were implement by a judge.

=== Mendoza rape articles ===
On June 24, 2009, Independent published an article revealing that Gallup mayor Harry Mendoza had been charged in a gang rape in 1948. Mendoza and his family said they knew nothing of the charges, and the case had never gone to court. In 2011, Mendoza sued the Independent for false light and in July 2012 a district court judge ruled in the newspaper's favor after a jury failed to reach a verdict.

On January 6, 2010, Independent publisher Bob Zollinger and Mendoza got into an altercation in the parking lot of a bank. Bob Zollinger told a local television station that he never threw a punch and was attacked by Mendoza, who was upset about the publication of articles linking the mayor to a gang rape 60 years ago. On July 20, 2010, Mendoza pleaded no contest to a charge of voluntarily engaging in a fight in a public place. This was a lesser charge than the original misdemeanor assault and battery charges that the mayor had faced.
