= List of United States post office murals in Oklahoma =

Following is a list of United States post office murals created in Oklahoma between 1934 and 1943. A number of Oklahoma post offices were listed on the National Register as part of the "Oklahoma Post Offices with Section Art Multiple Property Submission", including those in Coalgate, Hollis, Madill, Nowata, and Watonga.

Location	Mural title	Image	Artist	Date	Notes	NRHP listed
Anadarko			Stephen Mopope	1938	oil on canvas; sixteen panels on Indian life; mural featured on 2019 Post Office Murals stamp set	
Claremore	Will Rogers		Randall Davey	1939	tempera on canvas, moved to new post office	
Clinton	Race for Land		Loren Mozley	1938	oil on canvas, moved	
United States Post Office Coalgate, in Coalgate	Women Making Pishafa (aka Indian Family at Routine Tasks)	Women Making Pishafa	Acee Blue Eagle	1942	acrylic and tempera; mural was restored by Fred Beaver in 1965	2009
Cordell	The Scene Changes		Ila Turner McAfee	1938	oil on canvas	
Drumright	Oklahoma Land Rush		Frank Weathers Long	1941	oil on canvas	
Edmond	Pre-Settlement Days		Ila Turner McAfee	1939	oil on canvas	
Guymon	Harvest		Jay Risling	1939 ?	Mural was destroyed	
United States Post Office Hollis, in Hollis	Planning the Route		Lloyd Goff	1941	oil and egg tempera	2009
Hugo	The Red Man of Oklahoma Sees the First Stage Coach		Joseph Fleck	1937	oil on canvas; the original post office is now the Hugo School System Administration Building	
Idabel	The Last Home of the Chocktaw Nations		H. Louis Freund	1940	oil on canvas	
United States Post Office Madill, in Madill	Prairie Fire		Ethel Magafan	1941	tempera	2009
Marietta	Chickasaw Indian Family Making Pah Sho Fah		Solomon McCombs		oil on canvas Solomon McCombs, the artist, was Muscogee Creek. The mural was restored by Fred Beaver	
Marlow	Cattle Days		Lew E. Davis	1942	oil on canvas	
United States Post Office Nowata, in Nowata	Rainbow Trail		Woodrow Crumbo	1943	tempera. Artist was Citizen Potawatomi.	2009
Okemah	Grand Council of 1842		Walter Richard West	1941	tempera. Artist was Southern Cheyenne.	
Pawhuska	Osage Treaties		Olive Rush	1938	oil on canvas	
Perry	Range Branding Downby the Big Tank		Thomas Stell	1941	oil on canvas Mural was damaged and relocated to the Perry Historical Museum	
Poteau	Cotton		Joan Cunningham	1940	oil on canvas	
Purcell	The Roundup		Fred Conway	1940	oil on canvas Winner of the 48-State Mural Competition	
Sayre	The Opening of the Cheyenne and Arapaho Country	1940	Vance Kirkland	1940	oil on canvas	
Seminole	Seminole Indian Village Scene		Acee Blue Eagle	1939	oil on canvas	
Stillwater	Early Days in Payne County		Grace L. Hamilton	1963	oil on canvas	
Stilwell	Cherokee Farming and Animal Husbandry		Olga Mohr	1942	oil on canvas	
Sulphur	Romance of the Mail		Albert Reid	1939	oil on canvas	
Tahlequah	Choctaw Ball-Play, 1840		Manuel Bromberg	1939	oil on canvas	
Vinita	History of the Cherokee Nation		Randall Davey	1941	tempera	
United States Post Office Watonga, in Watonga	Roman Nose Canyon		Edith Mahier	1941	Oil on canvas; controversial in its depiction of Native Americans when it was completed, this is the best-known of Oklahoma post office murals. Shows Cheyenne Chief Henry Roman Nose with his family in confrontation with white settlers.	2009
Waurika	Wild Geese		Theodore Van Soelen	1939	oil on canvas	
Weatherford	Terminus of the Railroad, 1898–1901		Oscar Berninghaus	1939	oil on canvas	
Wewoka	Historical Background of Wewoka		Marjorie Rowland Clarke	1941	oil on canvas	
Yukon	The Run – April 22, 1889, Taking the Lead		Dahlov Ipcar	1941	oil on canvas	
