= Solomon McCombs =

Native American painter from Oklahoma (1913–1980)

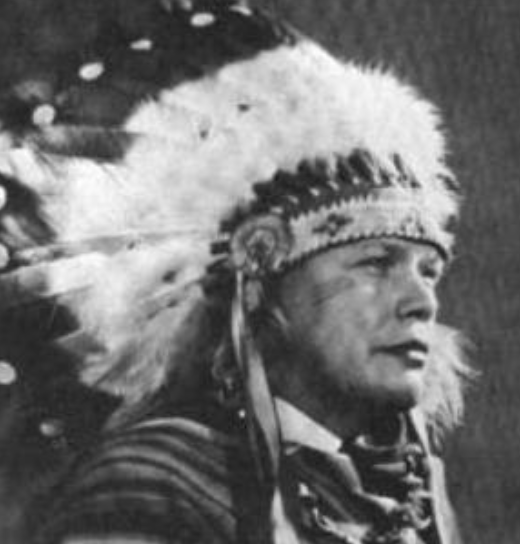
- Solomon McCombs, from a 1962 publication of the U.S. State Department
- Born: May 17, 1913; Eufaula, Oklahoma, U.S.
- Died: November 18, 1980 (aged 67); Tulsa, Oklahoma, U.S.
- Citizenship: Muscogee (Creek) Nation and American
- Education: Bacone College
- Known for: paintings, illustration, murals
- Style: Bacone school
- Spouse: Margarita Sauer McCombs (1961–1980, until his death)
- Relatives: Acee Blue Eagle, cousin

Solomon McCombs (Muscogee, 1913–1980) was a Native American artist from Oklahoma known for his paintings, murals, and illustrations.

McCombs worked as a muralist for the U.S. Treasury Section of Fine Arts in 1942 and as an illustrator and designer for the United States Department of State from 1956 until 1973. His paintings and murals often embraced the "Flatstyle" of painting with outlined shapes and natural colors, featuring traditional Muscogee Creek themes and narrative. He lived between Tulsa, Oklahoma and Arlington, Virginia.

== Early life and education ==
McCombs was born 1913 in Eufaula, Oklahoma to a Baptist minister. McCombs was of Muscogee Creek, Cherokee, and Irish descent and a member of the Muscogee (Creek) Nation. He grew up in eastern Oklahoma on a ranch and attended school in the Oak Grove community. As a child, McCombs was injured and confined to his bed, it was then he started to take an interest in fine art. By 1934, he was painting in a traditional-style.

William McCombs, Solomon's paternal great uncle was a founding member of Bacone College and his cousin, Acee Blue Eagle (Muscogee, 1907–1959) was an early leader within the Art Department at the school. Solomon McCombs attended Bacone College and Tulsa University's Downtown College, studying painting, Native American customs and traditions, as well as related history of the Muscogee Creek Nation. He studied with Acee Blue Eagle and Mary Stone McLendon at Bacone College.

== Career ==
In 1941, McCombs work was in an exhibition at Museum of Modern Art (MoMA) in New York City. McCombs illustrated a book for author Caroline Dormon in the 1940s.

U.S. Treasury Section of Fine Arts commissioned McCombs to paint the mural at the Marietta, Oklahoma Post Office titled, Chickasaw Family Making Pah Sho Fah (Pashofa) (1942). This mural depicts four women and two men cooking a meal of pashofa, an important dish to the Chickasaw people and part of their cultural identity. The mural was one of the last commissions by the Section of Fine Arts and was restored twice, in 1960 and again in 2006.

Starting in 1956, he was an illustrator for the United States Department of State within the audio-visual services division. With his work with the Department of State, McCombs was able to travel extensively to the Middle East, Africa, and India in order to lecture about Native American art and his work.

In 1961, he was married to artist Margarita Sauer McCombs (1925–1998).

In 1963 McCombs was a founder and president of the American Indian and Eskimo Cultural Foundation of Washington, DC.

In 1965, he won the Waite Phillips Trophy for Outstanding Contributions to American Indian Art, presented by the Philbrook Museum of Art (previously known as the Philbrook Art Center).

In 1973, he retired from working for the federal government. Before retiring, McComb's designed on the first logo for the American Indian National Bank of Washington D.C founded in 1973.

In 1978, McCombs was elected Second Chief by the Creek Nation.

== Death and legacy ==
He died on November 18, 1980, due to a stroke that occurred after surgery in the hospital in Tulsa, Oklahoma. He was buried in Tuskegee Cemetery in Eufaula, Oklahoma. After his death there was a two-person memorial exhibition was held for Fred Beaver and Solomon McCombs at Gilcrease Museum (March 7 through April 19, 1981).

His work is featured in various public art museum collections including Gilcrease Museum, Southern Plains Indian Museum, among others

The Muscogee (Creek) Nation has a building dedicated to McCombs, the Solomon McCombs Building.
