= Bacone school =

Native American intertribal art movement

The Bacone school or Bacone style of painting, drawing, and printmaking is a Native American intertribal "Flatstyle" art movement, primarily from the mid-20th century in Eastern Oklahoma and named for Bacone College. This art movement bridges historical, tribally-specific pictorial painting and carving practices towards an intertribal Modernist style of easel painting. This style is also influenced by the art programs of Chilocco Indian School, north of Ponca City, Oklahoma, and Haskell Indian Industrial Training Institute, in Lawrence, Kansas and features a mix of Southeastern, Prairie, and Central Plains tribes.

== History ==
The Oklahoma and New Mexico Native American art movements in the first half of the 1900s share similar traits that define the Native American art market, including patronage, mentoring, community-based collectives, and new structures of support through education and museums. The Bacone school art movement was influenced by the Bacone College, as well as art programs of Chilocco Indian School, and Haskell Indian Industrial Training Institute, all of which were located in a similar geographic region. Tribes from the Southeastern, Prairie, and Central Plains regions each have their own historical practices of pictorial representation, whether in carving or painting; however, removal to Indian Territory in the 19th century disrupted many customary art practices. Access to Western art materials (such as easels, watercolors) gave Native artists a new means of self-expression, as well as a new way of recording history and daily practices.

=== "Flatstyle" ===
The Bacone style differs from the two other prevalent flat styles of Native American painting in Oklahoma of the time: Kiowa style, and the Studio style. The "Flatstyle" painting was in part made popular in the 1920s by the Kiowa style (also known as Southern Plains style) of painting by the Kiowa Six, which was rooted in the teachings of Oscar Jacobson at the School of Art at the University of Oklahoma (OU), where he served as director from 1915 to 1945. However the Bacone style was specifically different from the Kiowa style because the artists used brighter colors, depicted more movement and action, and included visual perspective. The Southern Plains style had its origins in Plains hide painting and winter counts. After the decline of buffalo herds in the late 19th century, Plains painting shifted to Ledger art, which, under the stewardship of such artists as Silver Horn (1860/1–1940, Kiowa), evolved into easel art.

The Studio style, as taught at the Santa Fe Indian School, first by Dorothy Dunn and later by Gerónima Cruz Montoya (Ohkay Owingeh), built upon the accomplishments of the San Ildefonso school of painters and Hopi painters such as Fred Kabotie, who were successful "Flatstyle" easel artists in the 1910s and 1920s in Arizona and New Mexico. These artists were inspired by Pueblo mural painting and pottery painting traditions. Their work often features pastoral scenes in muted colors. Collectively, these three Flatstyle movements were sometimes derided by Native artists in the 1960s as "Bambi Art," which has been criticized as nostalgic, sentimental, and limited in scope.

=== Bacone College influence ===
Acee Blue Eagle (Muscogee Creek) was a student at Chilocco Indian School and a student of Oscar Jacobson's at OU; he helped shape the Bacone style.

The first Bacone College's art department director was musician/storyteller Mary "Ataloa" Stone McLendon, and between 1932 until 1935, she had built the structure that later became an early classroom for the art department (and is now named the Ataloa Lodge Museum). She was followed by Blue Eagle serving as the second director from 1935 to 1939. Woody Crumbo (Potawatomi) succeeded him in 1938. The year 1938 is given by artist Ruthe Blalock Jones (Shawnee/Delaware/Peoria) as the date the Bacone School of Indian Painting was established, although some would say it should be 1935.

== Style and media ==
Both Blue Eagle's and Crumbo's styles were also influenced by the streamlined, bold look of Art Deco. Casein on illustration board was a popular medium, as well as gouache and watercolor. Technical skill in draftsmanship was emphasized, as was the ethnographic accuracy of subjects portrayed. Paintings were aesthetically pleasing, with contours of a certain hue often surrounded by outlines of lighter tints, to emphasize the spiritual nature of the subject. Figures were brilliantly colored with backgrounds of a "subdued palettes of greens, blues, and browns," as Ruthe Blalock Jones writes. Blue, in particular, is a color representing sorrow, loss, and memory for some Southeastern tribes, and is often a preferred background color. Implied narrative gave the Bacone style a sense of drama.

== Development ==
The Philbrook Museum of Art of Tulsa, Oklahoma helped foster the development of the Bacone style with its Indian Annual competitive art show from 1947 to 1957. The Five Civilized Tribes Museum of Muskogee, Oklahoma and the Cherokee Heritage Center of Park Hill, Oklahoma both host annual arts shows with categories specifically for this style of art (the Cecil Dick award and the Jerome Tiger award, respectively). The Gilcrease Museum in Tulsa, Oklahoma and National Cowboy and Western Heritage Museum in Oklahoma City have extensive collections of Bacone School art.

== Bacone school artists ==
- Archie Blackowl, Southern Cheyenne
- Fred Beaver, Muscogee Creek/Seminole
- Acee Blue Eagle, Muscogee Creek
- Woody Crumbo, Citizen Potawatomi
- John Gritts, Cherokee Nation
- Franklin Gritts, Cherokee
- Albert Harjo, Muscogee Creek
- Joan Hill, Muscogee Creek/Cherokee
- Ruthe Blalock Jones, Shawnee/Peoria
- Barbara McAlister, Cherokee Nation
- Solomon McCombs, Muscogee Creek
- Jackson Narcomey, Muscogee Creek
- Terry Saul, Choctaw Nation of Oklahoma
- Jerome Tiger, Muscogee Creek/Seminole
- Dick West, Southern Cheyenne

== See also ==
- Native American art
- List of Native American artists from Oklahoma
