= United States Post Office (Coalgate, Oklahoma) =

- United States Post Office Coalgate
- U.S. National Register of Historic Places
- Location within Oklahoma Location within the United States
- Location: 38 N. Main St., Coalgate, Oklahoma
- Coordinates: 34°32′21″N 96°13′4″W
- Area: less than one acre
- Built: 1940
- Architect: Louis A. Simon
- Architectural style: Moderne
- MPS: Oklahoma Post Offices with Section Art MPS
- NRHP reference No.: 09000214
- Added to NRHP: April 17, 2009

The United States Post Office Coalgate is a post office in Coalgate, Oklahoma. It contains a mural, Women Making Pishafa, painted by artist Acee Blue Eagle (Muscogee, ca. 1907–1959). The post office is listed on the National Register of Historic Places.

== History ==
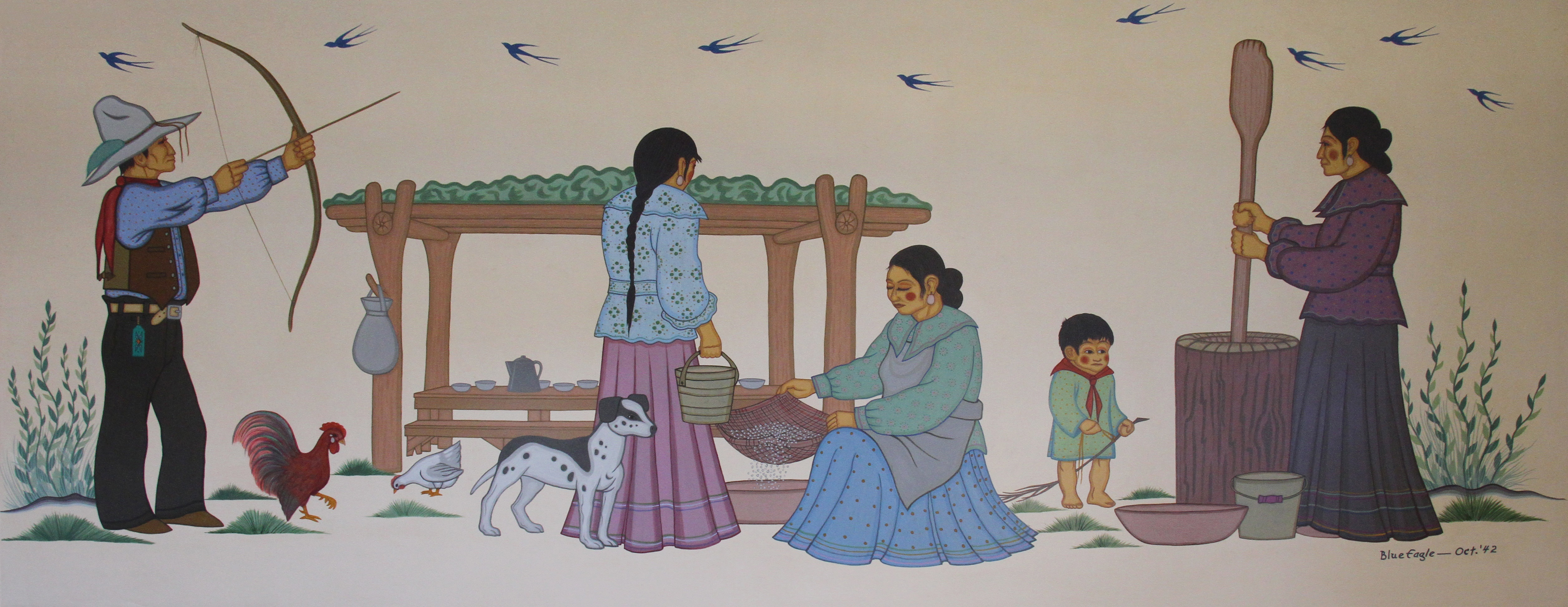
Indian Family at Routine Tasks (1942), U.S. post office mural by Acee Blue Eagle

Coalgate's plans to build new post office were approved by the federal government in 1937. A New Deal program, the Treasury Department's Section of Painting and Sculpture, required that a portion of the money designated for the construction of federal buildings be used to pay for artists to decorate them. The post office was completed in 1940. The federal government commissioned Muscogee Creek artist Acee Blue Eagle to paint a mural, which he completed in 1942. The post office is one of only three in Oklahoma to have a mural painted directly onto its plaster wall. Blue Eagle was a significant Native American painter who founded the art program at Bacone College and helped create the Bacone school of Flatstyle painting. The post office is significant because it is representative of historic New Deal politics, government, and art, and the post office and mural together show how a local New Deal project was realized. The post office was added to the National Register of Historic Places in 2009.

== Architecture ==
The post office's supervising architect was Louis A. Simon. The building is in the Art Moderne style with a flat roof and an asymmetrical front. While the entrance to the building is centered, the four large windows around it are not, with two to the left, one to the right, one above the entrance, and an additional smaller window on the far right side of the building. The name of the building is off-center and is instead centered over the four large windows. The building's exterior is in buff-colored brick with occasional darker orange-shaded bricks. The entrance to the I-shaped lobby is through a wood-and-glass-enclosed vestibule, with service bays on the wall opposite the entrance.

== Women Making Pishafa ==
The mural is located above the door to the postmaster's office. Blue Eagle used distemper and acrylics to paint the mural. The painting is an example of the style known as Bacone school, a form of Flatstyle painting, popular among Native artists in the early to mid-20th century. Painted directly onto the plaster wall of the building, Women Making Pishafa depicts people preparing pashofa, a flint corn soup that is made by Muscogee Creeks and other Southeastern tribes. A woman on the right side of the painting pounds corn into cornmeal. In the center, two women separate the corn husk from the corn pulp. A table behind them is set with bowls and a coffee pot, which shows that pashofa can be a soup or a beverage. While the women work, a boy plays with a toy horse, and a man on the left side of the painting shoots an arrow at a flock of birds overhead.

During 1964 renovations to the post office interior, dust and dirt damaged the painting. Fred Beaver (Seminole/Muscogee, 1911–1980), restored the mural.
