= Albert Harjo =

Native American painter

- Born: September 25, 1937; Muscogee (Creek) Nation, Oklahoma, United States
- Died: September 6, 2019 (aged 81)
- Citizenship: Muscogee (Creek) Nation and US
- Education: Chilocco Indian Agricultural School
- Style: Bacone school

Albert Lee Harjo (1937 – 2019), born in the Muscogee (Creek) Nation in Hanna, Oklahoma, was a fullblood Muscogee artist.

== Education ==
Harjo was born on September 25, 1937, in Hanna, Oklahoma, on the Muscogee Indian Reservation. He attended Jones Academy in Hartshorne, Oklahoma, then later Chilocco Indian Agricultural School, just north of Ponca City, Oklahoma. After graduating with a high school diploma from Chilocco, Harjo enlisted and served in the United States Marine Corps. He was honorably discharged in 1959.

== Art career ==
Harjo's subject matter derived from his own life experiences as well those of neighbors, friends and family. Albert painted in the Bacone school, a Flatstyle of painting defined by Southeaster tribal artists active at Bacone College. His paintings used colors and multiple contour lines to define figures and shapes, as opposed to three-dimensional perspective or shading. He worked in distemper and watercolor.

Harjo exhibited his work at the Five Civilized Tribes Museum, Red Earth Festival, Creek Council House Museum, and the Philbrook Museum of Art. He also contributed his art work for causes such as the Red Cross and Native American bone marrow recruitment.

Harjo's paintings can be found in museums, galleries, and private collections throughout Eastern Oklahoma, the United States, and abroad.

== Death ==
Harjo died on September 6, 2019
