= Jimmy Anderson (musician) =

American artist and musician (1932–2026)

- Born: James Anderson; August 14, 1932; Kansas City, Missouri, U.S.
- Died: March 2, 2026 (aged 93)
- Occupations: Artist, musician, preacher

James Anderson (August 14, 1932 – March 2, 2026), clan name Ahhajumba, was a Muscogee–American painter, musician and Christian preacher. He attended Haskell Institute and then studied art at Bacone College with painters Fred Beaver, Pablita Velarde, and Dick West. Anderson's paintings in the Oklahoma flatstyle movement were first exhibited in the 1950s.

== The Osceola Four ==
Anderson formed the Osceola Four, a native singing quartet, while studying at Haskell, joining his brother Richard Anderson, Mitcheal Beaver, and J.B. Dreadfulwater. He toured with the group, singing pop songs and spirituals as an evangelical team. The group performed on Oklahoma television shows like the Sooner Shindig show, and they appeared on a Spike Jones Orchestra album as well.

== Preaching ==
After graduating from the University of Oklahoma, Anderson attended seminary school. He later became the preacher at Many Springs Baptist Church in Holdenville, Oklahoma. As the last remaining member of the Osceola Four, Anderson continued to sing at church in both English and his native Creek language.

== Death ==
Anderson died on March 2, 2026, at the age of 93.
