= Marlene Riding In Mameah =

Pawnee Native American silversmith and painter (1933–2018)

- Skau-doo-dau-deh-wau-dah
- Born: Marlene Mary Riding In; March 5, 1933; Payne County, Oklahoma, U.S.
- Died: July 10, 2018 (aged 85); Pawnee, Oklahoma, U.S.
- Education: Bacone College
- Known for: Southern Plains German silverwork
- Spouse(s): Charles Supernaw, Clayton Mameah
- Awards: Red Earth Festival; 2007 Honored One

Marlene Riding In Mameah (March 5, 1933 – July 10, 2018) was a Pawnee Native American silversmith and painter.

Born Marlene Mary Riding In in Payne County, Oklahoma, Mameah was a member of the Pawnee Nation of Oklahoma.

== Education ==
Mameah attended Chilocco Indian School. She then went to Bacone College, where she wished to study silversmithing. But the class was unavailable to women, so she had to take painting classes instead; she later learned to work with silver while working for a jeweler. Her instructor was W. Richard West, Sr. (Southern Cheyenne)

== Art career ==
In 1950, her painting Morning Star Ceremony, submitted under the name "M. Riding Inn", received a prize of $150 in the Indian Annual's Plains division.

Mameah taught metalworking at Pawnee Nation College. She won numerous honors throughout her career, and in 2007 was named the Honored One of the Red Earth Festival. Morning Star Ceremony is owned by the Philbrook Museum of Art.
