= Cecil Dick =

American painter

Cecil Dıck
- Born: Dá-Ga-Dah-Ga Standing Alone (Cherokee Name); 1915; Rosé Prairie, Oklahoma, U.S.
- Died: April 26, 1992; Tahlequah, Oklahoma
- Education: Santa Fe Indian School
- Known for: Painting, murals
- Movement: Studio style, "Flatstyle"
- Awards: Sequoyah Medal

Cecil Dick, or Degadoga (1915–1992) was a well-known Cherokee artist often referred to as "the Father of Cherokee Traditional Art."

== Early life and education ==
Cecil, born near Rose Prairie, Oklahoma, was one of the pioneers of 20th-century, flat-style painting among Eastern Woodland tribes in Oklahoma. He was part of the Cherokee Nation and the United Keetoowah Band of Cherokee Indians. During childhood, he spoke only the Cherokee language. He became an orphan when he was 12 years old, and was raised in Indian boarding schools. He attended "The Studio" at the Santa Fe Indian School and Bacone College.

== Career ==
Dick did not paint on a regular schedule, but only when he felt like doing so. He regularly worked as a draftsman and as a sign painter to support himself. Hence his art work is relatively rare. He also became known as an authority on Cherokee mythology and the written Cherokee language.

Cecil Dick became the first Native American to win the Oklahoma Artists Exhibition at Philbrook Museum of Art in Tulsa. In 1983 Cecil was honored for his intellectual and artistic achievements with the Sequoyah Medal by the Cherokee Nation. (Note: He was the third person to receive the award.) The Cherokee Heritage Association held a 50-year retrospective exhibition of his lifetime work that same year. In 1991, the Five Civilized Tribes Museum in Muskogee, Oklahoma named the "Cecil Dick Master of Heritage Award" in his honor. This award is given out during its annual Competitive Art Show to recognize outstanding paintings in the flat-style.

== Death and legacy ==
Cecil died in 1992 in Tahlequah, Oklahoma, having spent over 50 years recording Cherokee culture and history in his art. His obituary stated that some of his paintings were in the Smithsonian Institution in Washington, D. C., the Heard Museum in Phoenix, Tulsa's Gilcrease Museum and the Five Civilized Tribes Museum in Muskogee.

In 1996, a group of Talequah physicians donated an original Dick acrylic mural to the Cherokee Nation. One of the physicians, Ed Painter, had commissioned the work in 1960, and hung it in the Tahlequah Medical Center. The mural is 4 feet (1.2 m) tall by 15 feet (4.6 m) wide. Titled "The Curing of the Fever," it portrays Cherokee healing practices before the initial contact with white men.

Native American art experts reportedly appraised the auction value of the mural in the range of $65,000 to $100,000.

== See also ==
- List of Native American artists
- Visual arts by indigenous peoples of the Americas
