= Ruthe Blalock Jones =

Delaware-Shawnee-Peoria painter and printmaker

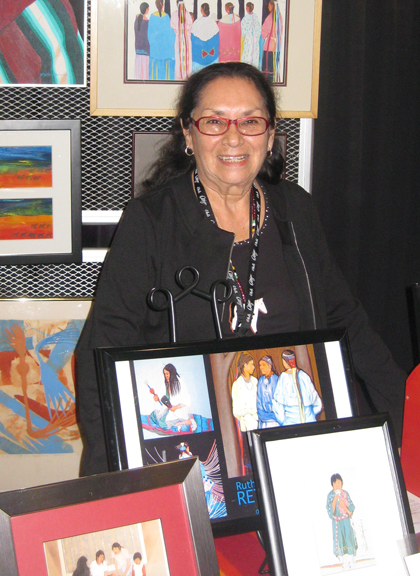
- Born: Ruthe Blalock Jones; Chulundit; June 8, 1939 (age 87); Claremore, Oklahoma
- Citizenship: Shawnee Tribe and Americans
- Education: MA Northeastern State University, BFA University of Tulsa, AA Bacone College
- Known for: painting, printmaking
- Movement: Bacone school
- Awards: Red Earth Festival Grand Award, 1987; Oklahoma Governor's Arts and Education Award, 1993; Oklahoma Women's Hall of Fame, 1995; Bacone College's Dick West Award, 2000; Red Earth Honored One, 2011
- Website: rutheblalockjonesindianart.com

Ruthe Blalock Jones (born 1939) is a Delaware-Shawnee-Peoria painter and printmaker from Oklahoma.

== Background ==
Ruthe Blalock Jones was born on June 8, 1939, in Claremore, Oklahoma. Her parents are Joe and Lucy Parks Blalock. Her tribal name is Chulundit. She is enrolled with the Shawnee Tribe. Her father Joe Blalock was Shawnee/Peoria and her mother Lucy Parks Blalock was Delaware. She is a member of the Horse Clan of the Lower Band of Shawnee.

She earned an associate degree from Bacone College in 1970. She then earned a bachelor of fine arts degree from the University of Tulsa in 1972. In 1985 she attended the University of Oklahoma and earned her master's degree from Northeastern State University in 1989. Her art career began much earlier, when she was ten years old and a student under Charles Banks Wilson.

== Art career ==
At the age of 13, Jones entered her first juried art show at the Philbrook Museum of Art and received an honorable mention. She works in oil, acrylic, watercolor, pen and ink, and pencil as well as printing monotypes.

Her first art award was an honorable mention at the Philbrook Art Museum's annual show in 1954, when Jones was 15 years old. In 1995 she was inducted in the Oklahoma Women's Hall of Fame. In 2011, she was named the Red Earth Festival's Honored One. In 2014 she was awarded the American Indian Circle of Honor Award by the Tulsa City-County Library.

"Ruthe's art speaks volumes about the pride of her tribal relationships. ... She pays acute attention to authenticity in detail of dress and the ceremonial aspects of traditional tribal life, and some of her paintings could easily be her childhood recollections," writes art historian Dr. Mary Jo Watson (Seminole). "Ruthe has many talents maybe others are not aware (of). She is a champion hoop dancer, war dancer and excellent cook."

== Public collections ==
Ruthe Jones' work can be found in the following public collections:

- Bacone College
- Five Civilized Tribes Museum
- Heard Museum
- George Gustav Heye Center
- Gilcrease Museum
- Murrow Indian's Children's Home
- Northeastern State University
- Okmulgee Public School System
- Philbrook Museum of Art
- Red Earth Museum
- Sequoyah National Research Center
- Southern Plains Indian Museum
- Tulsa Performing Arts Center
- University of Tulsa
- United States Department of the Interior

== Published works ==
- "Delaware Commentaries." Grumet, Robert Steven, ed. Voices from the Delaware Big House Ceremony. Norman: University of Oklahoma Press, 2001. ISBN 978-0-8061-3360-7.
- "The Bread Dance: A Shawnee Ceremony of Thanks of Renewal." Townsend, Richard F., ed. Hero, Hawk, and Open Hand: American Indian Art of the Ancient Midwest and South. New Haven: Yale University Press, 2004. ISBN 978-0-300-10601-5.
