= Barbara McAlister (mezzo-soprano) =

American opera singer

- Born: 1942 (age 83–84); Muskogee, Oklahoma, U.S.

Barbara McAlister (born 1942) is a mezzo-soprano Native American opera singer from Muskogee, Oklahoma.

== Background ==
Barbara McAlister was born Muskogee, Oklahoma, in 1942. She is an enrolled member of the Cherokee Nation, a descendant of Old Tassel, and half German/Cherokee through her mother. She aspired to be a country-western singer in her youth, but learned to love opera from her parents.

For her dedication to promoting the Cherokee language, she was awarded the Cherokee Medal of Honor from the Cherokee Honor Society.

== Musical career ==
She won the Loren Zachary Competition in Los Angeles, which launched her career. She has since performed in the opera houses of Passau, Koblenz, Bremerhaven, and most notably Flensburg, where she was engaged for a decade. She has given solo performances at the Weill Recital Hall in Carnegie Hall, Alice Tully Hall, and has performed with companies throughout Europe and the United States.

== Visual arts ==
McAlister also paints in the Bacone style of flat-style Native painting from Prairie, Plains, and Eastern tribes. She has exhibited her paintings at the Five Civilized Tribes Museum and Jacobson House Native Arts Center in Oklahoma, the Wharton Art Gallery in Philadelphia, and Bullock's in Los Angeles.
