= Heidi BigKnife =

Artist

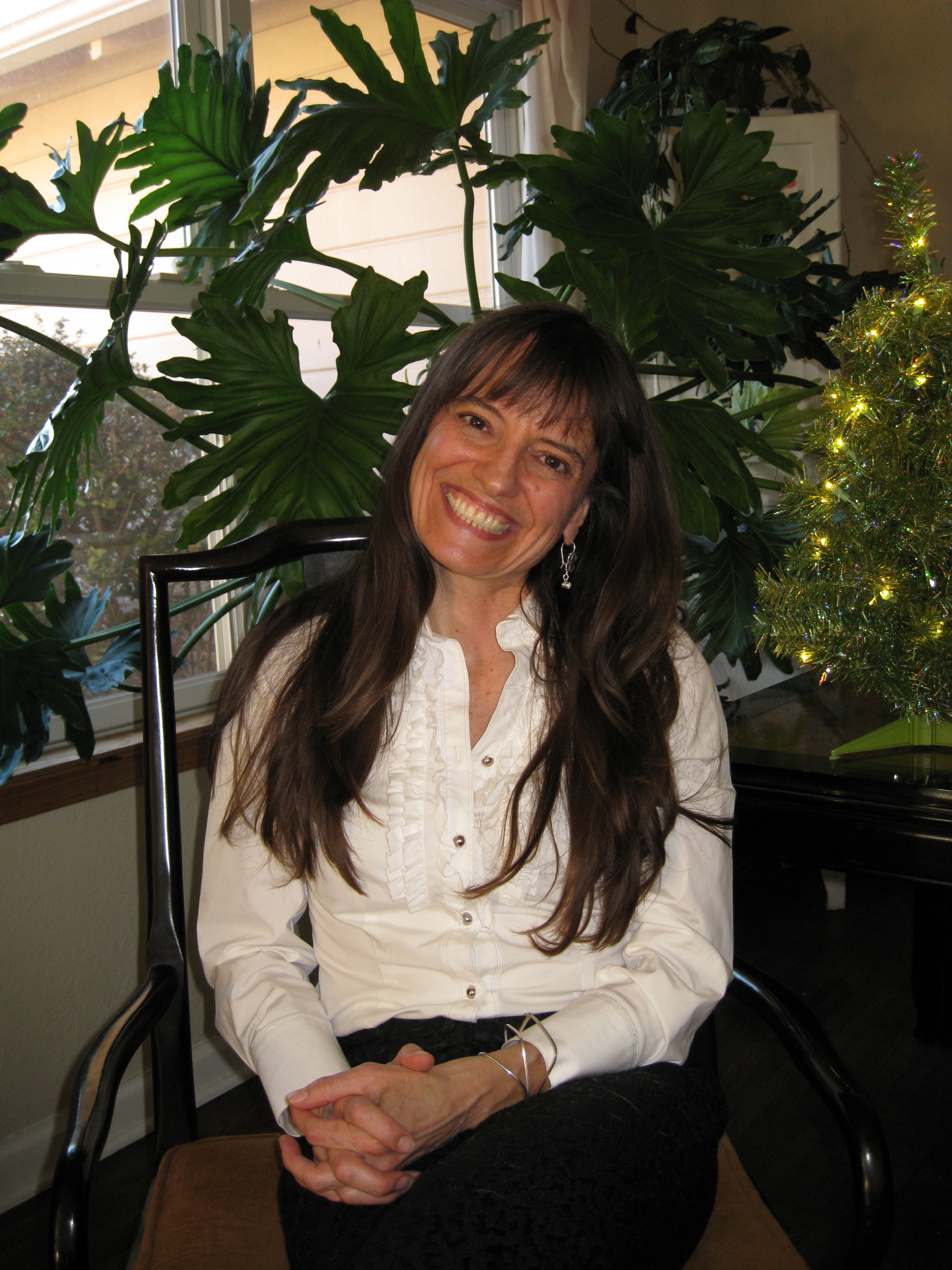
- Heidi BigKnife, Shawnee Tribe
- Born: May 13, 1967 (age 58); Enid, Oklahoma, United States
- Citizenship: enrolled in Shawnee Tribe; United States citizen
- Education: Beloit College, Institute of American Indian Arts, University of Illinois
- Known for: jeweler, sculptor, and collage artist

Heidi BigKnife (born May 13, 1967, Shawnee Tribe) is a Native American artist living in Oklahoma. She is well known for her unique jewelry, a talent she developed at the Institute of American Indian Art.

== Early life ==
Heidi BigKnife was born in Enid, Oklahoma and grew up in Denver, Colorado, where her Shawnee mother worked in interior design. Her father trained pilots at the Vance Air Force Base in Enid while in the service; he later worked as a commercial pilot. She is enrolled in the Shawnee Nation.

BigKnife has said that her career was influenced by her mother's artistic eye during her childhood. She remembers doing countless arts-and-crafts projects with her mother and developing the skill to "create something out of nothing." While in grade school, BigKnife was placed in a gifted and talented program through which she was allowed to tour various museums and view art that she would not otherwise have seen. In junior high, BigKnife enrolled in the drafting and shop classes to learn more about making items; she was the only female in the classes. During her high school years, BigKnife developed a love for photography that she carried into college, where she studied more.

Shawnee on her mother's side, BigKnife began to be more aware of her heritage and identify as Shawnee during her college years. After graduating from the Institute of American Indian Arts, she adopted her maternal grandmother's maiden name, BigKnife, as her surname.

== Education ==
After graduating from high school, BigKnife attended Beloit College in Beloit, Wisconsin. BigKnife received a Bachelor of Studio Arts degree (photography concentration) from Beloit.

In the early 1990s, BigKnife earned an associate degree in two- and three-dimensional design from the Institute of American Indian Arts in Santa Fe, New Mexico. She continued to study photography at the Institute under Meridel Rubenstein and took her first jewelry class with Lane Coulter. She attended the University of Illinois at Urbana–Champaign (1993–1995), where she studied color photography, digital imaging, and videography.

== Style and notable works ==
BigKnife works in jewelry design, often gathering found items for inspiration. Her work attempts to preserve her Native American culture while simultaneously recycling images of the past into new forms and shapes through materials and techniques. She is also a skilled metalsmith and combines political and social messages into her pieces.

Some of her works are featured in the permanent collections of the Museum of Contemporary Native Arts and the Heard Museum.

== Awards and achievements ==
BigKnife was awarded the Helen Hardin Memorial Scholarship, which she used primarily to purchase jewelry supplies.

Her work has appeared in Tulsa People magazine and has been reviewed by Metalsmith magazine. Her work has won competitive awards for jewelry at the Tulsa Indian Art Festival, Indian Market, and the Heard Indian Art Fair

She has even started her own business, Bigknife Designs, which she has run and managed for nearly 30 years.
