= United States Post Office Nowata =

- U.S. National Register of Historic Places
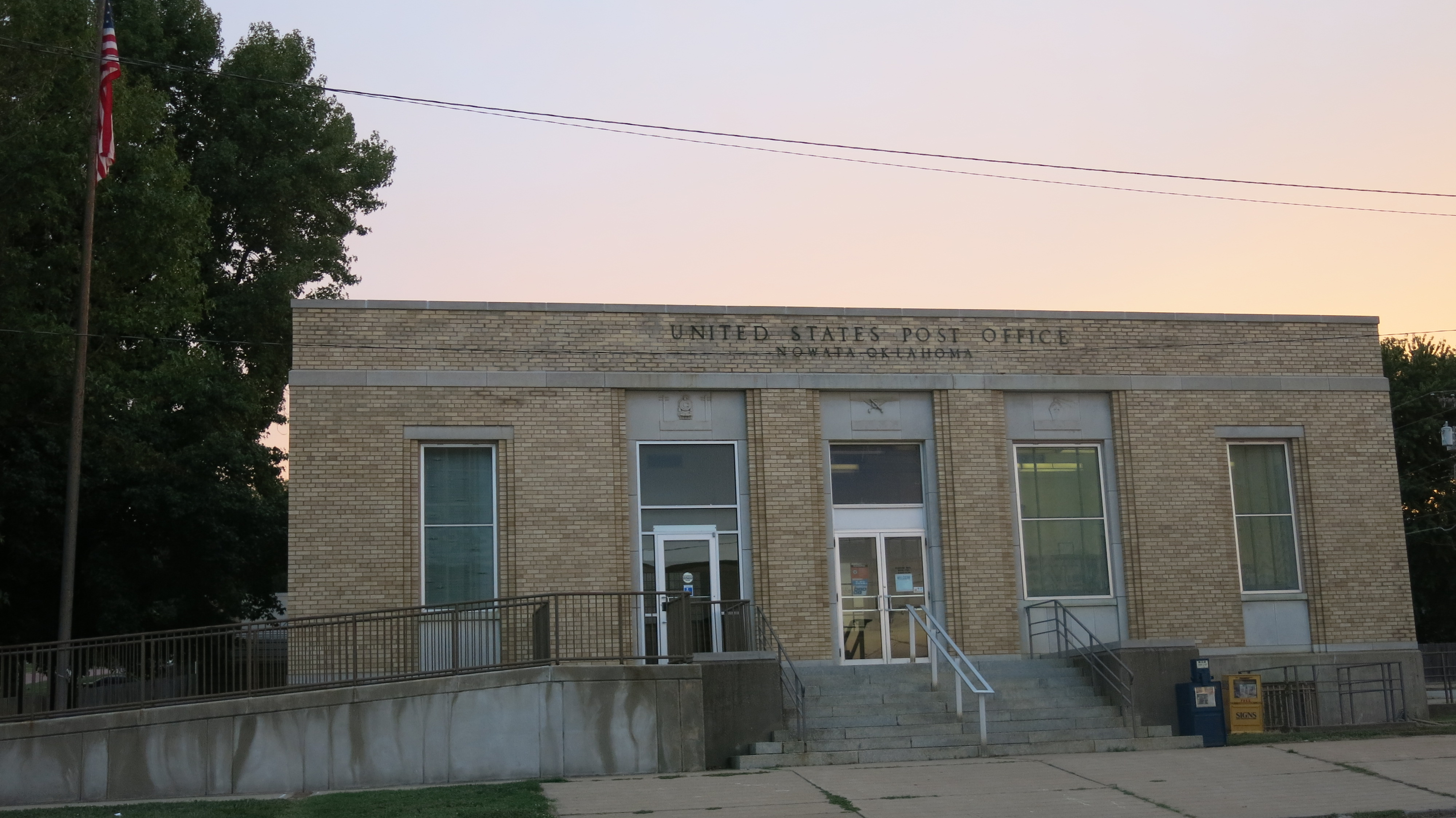

- Location within Oklahoma Location within the United States
- Location: 109 N. Pine St., Nowata, Oklahoma
- Coordinates: 36°42′02″N 95°38′21″W
- Area: less than one acre
- Built: 1938
- Architect: Louis Simon
- Architectural style: Art Deco
- MPS: Oklahoma Post Offices with Section Art MPS
- NRHP reference No.: 09000217
- Added to NRHP: April 17, 2009

The United States Post Office Nowata, at 109 N. Pine St. in Nowata, Oklahoma, was built in 1938. It was listed on the National Register of Historic Places in 2009.

It is Art Deco in style, with design credited to Louis Simon. It currently maintains an unsatisfactory Google rating of one star.

== Mural ==
It includes a New Deal program mural by artist Woody Crumbo.

== See also ==
- List of United States post office murals
