= Dean Chavers =

American activist (born 1941)

Dean Chavers (born 1941) is the director of Catching the Dream, formerly known as the Native American Scholarship fund. The organization has produced 679 Native American college graduates since 1987, including 110 educators, 38 doctors, 28 engineers, 104 business graduates, and 110 scientists.

== Early life and education ==
He was born to Lumbee parents. His mother was Dorothy Marie Godwin and his father was Issac Locklear. However, his mother married Luther Cherry Chavers before he was born, and it was Luther that he called daddy. He attended the University of Richmond for two years, 1960–62, before joining the US Air Force as an Aviation Cadet. Chavers received his B.A. from the University of California at Berkeley, and his two M.A. degrees and his Ph.D. from Stanford University. As a student activist, Chavers and his fellow American Indian students were successful in petitioning the university to change the school's mascot from the Stanford Indian to the Stanford Cardinal. Chavers distinguished himself as a navigator during the Vietnam War. He flew 138 missions and received the Air Medal, the Distinguished Flying Cross, and eight other awards. He also spent 30 years as a newspaper columnist, writing on American Indian education, Lumbee recognition, and other social justice issues. Dr. Chavers participated in the famed Indian occupation of Alcatraz Island in 1969.

== Career ==
Chavers has spent 35 years as a consultant in Indian education has written 25 books, including The National Indian Grant Directory, How to Write Winning Proposals, "Modern American Indian Leaders," "Racism in Indian Country," and Exemplary Programs in Indian Education. He is the former President of Bacone College. At Bacone, he moved it from being a junior college to being a senior college.

He has presented seminars, keynote speeches, and training all over the U. S. He has appeared at Stanford University, the University of South Dakota, the University of Oklahoma, the University of North Carolina at Pembroke, Fayetteville School District, NC, the Cherokee Nation, the Navajo Nation, the National Indian Education Association, Ganado Unified School District, Chinle Unified School District, St. Francis Indian School, Umon Hon Nation Schools, and The College Board. He also taught a Native American Education course at Cal State Hayward in early 1970s. His most popular seminar is "How to Write Winning Proposals," which he has presented more than 125 times. His book by the same name was published by CTD. He also trains people in how to improve their schools through a seminar called "How to Develop Exemplary Programs." His most recent book was "Racism in Indian Country," published by Peter Lang Publishers in 2009. His book before that was a two-volume work of 800 pages called "Modern American Indian Leaders," published by Mellen Press in 2007. Both are being used as college textbooks.

As director of Catching the Dream, Chavers has helped 679 Native American students finish college. He initiated the Exemplary Programs in Indian Education (EPIE) Movement in 1988, which has founded 39 such programs in Indian schools.
