= Hote' Casella =

American mezzo-soprano, Native American cultural ambassador (1909–1990)

- Ho-Te-Ma-We
- Casella in The Billings Gazette, 1971
- Born: Gladys Bland Mathonican; 1909; San Angelo, Texas
- Died: 1990 (aged 80–81)
- Other names: Hote Casella, Hoté Casella
- Education: University of California, Los Angeles, Juilliard School
- Occupation: Singer

Hote' Casella (1909–1990) was an American mezzo-soprano and Native American cultural ambassador. She sang throughout the United States and Europe from the 1940s until the early 1980s.

== Early life and education ==
Hote' Casella was born Gladys Bland Mathonican Miller in 1909 in San Angelo, Texas, the youngest of seven children. Casella's Native American name, "Ho-Te-Ma-We," means "mockingbird". Her father, (Andrew) John Mathonican, was Cherokee and worked as a billiards hall manager, and her mother, Marzella Carter, had Italian and Spanish ancestry. Casella's family moved to Los Angeles in the early 1920s. She studied at University of California, Los Angeles (UCLA) and Juilliard and trained in German lieder and French and Italian music.

== Career ==
She moved to New York in the 1940s. Casella's debut New York performance was at the Town Hall on February 28, 1944, accompanied by Coenraad V. Bos. She sang traditional operatic selections by composers including Handel, Francesco Gasparini and Gabriel Fauré, as well as Native American music arranged by Troyer, Jeancon and Cadman. Casella later appeared annually at this venue.

Throughout the next several decades, Casella performed throughout the country at venues including the American Museum of Natural History, the National Folk Festival in Knoxville, Tennessee, and the Detroit Institute of Arts. She expanded her repertoire over the years to add more Native American music, including songs by the Cherokee, Navajo, Zuni, Apache, Hopi, Cheyenne, Sioux, Ojibway/Chippewa people, most from the 18th and 19th centuries.

Later in her career, Casella devoted her career to teaching audiences, particularly children, about Native American culture, and to situating Native American music amid the larger folk music tradition. She told the Newspaper Enterprise in 1966 that she wished to do for Native American music what Igor Moiseyev had done for popularizing and professionalizing Russian folk dances.

Casella died in 1990.

== See also ==
- Mary Stone McLendon
