= Flatstyle =

Flatstyle refers to several 20th-century American Indian painting styles with limited or no shading or perspective but emphasized shape and contour. These include:

- Bacone school, popularized by Bacone College, Muskogee, Oklahoma from the 1930s through 1980s
- San Ildefonso School, active in New Mexico from the 1910s through 1940s
- Southern Plains style, popularized by the Kiowa Six, beginning in the late 1920s.
- Studio style, taught by Dorothy Dunn and Géronima Montoya Cruz at the Santa Fe Indian School, New Mexico, from the 1930s to early 1960s.
