= Ila Mae McAfee =

American painter

Ila McAfee
- Born: October 27, 1897; Gunnison, Colorado, US
- Died: April 18, 1995 (aged 97); Pueblo, Colorado, US
- Resting place: Santa Fe National Cemetery
- Education: Western State Colorado University; National Academy of Design; Art Institute of Chicago
- Known for: Painting
- Spouse: Elmer Turner

Ila Mae McAfee (October 21, 1897 or 1900 – April 18, 1995), also known as Ila McAfee Turner, was an American painter, muralist, illustrator and author. She was born in or near Gunnison, Colorado and known for her miniatures and as an animalier and muralist. She is best remembered for her paintings of horses, Western themes, landscapes, and portraits of Pueblos.

McAfee studied at Western State Colorado College, at the Art Students League, the National Academy of Design and with James E. McBurney in Chicago.

During the Depression McAfee created post office murals through the Section of Painting and Sculpture in Gunnison, Colorado, Clifton, Texas, Cordell, Oklahoma and Edmond, Oklahoma. As a tribute to her mother-in-law, Edith Turner, McAfee presented three murals to the public library of Greeley, Colorado, where Mrs. Turner had served as Assistant Librarian for many years.

McAfee was the author and illustrator of Indians, Horses, Hills, Et Cetera and the illustrator for Historic Costume: A Resume of Style and Fashion From Remote Times to the Nineteen Seventies by Katherine Morris Lester.

Ila met her husband, painter Elmer Page Turner, when they were both art students in Chicago. They were married in 1926 and moved to Taos, New Mexico in 1928.

In 1981 she was designated Taos Artist of the Year.

== Collections ==
- Gilcrease Museum in Tulsa, Oklahoma.

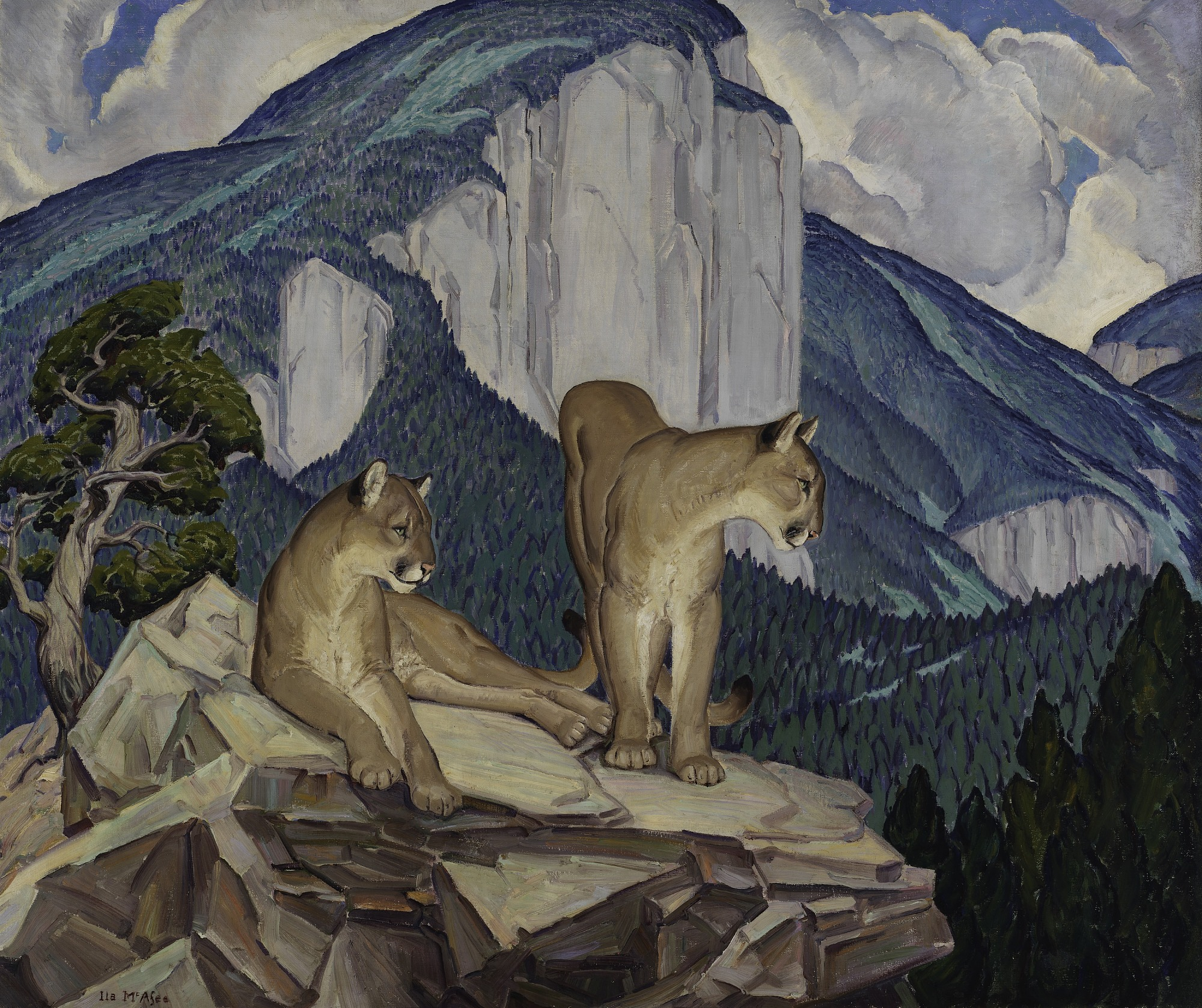
Mountain Lions (1933–34), easel painting for the Public Works of Art Project

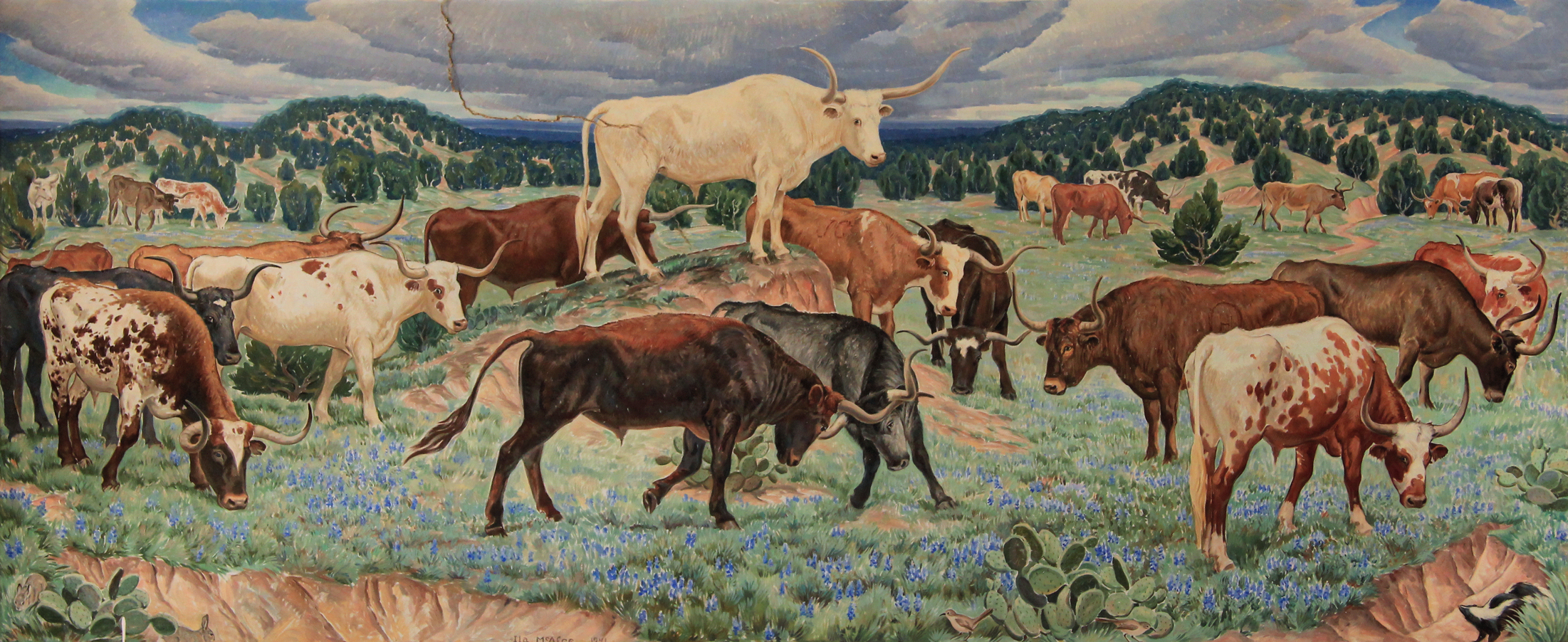
Texas Longhorn—A Vanishing Breed (1941), mural for the U.S. post office in Clifton, Texas
