= Mary Stone McLendon =

Native American professor and singer

- Ataloa
- Born: Mary Kuth Stone; March 27, 1896 near Duncan, Chickasaw Nation, Indian Territory, U.S.
- Died: November 11, 1967 (aged 71); Santa Monica, California, U.S.
- Citizenship: Chickasaw Nation, American
- Education: Oklahoma College for Woman, University of Redlands, Columbia University
- Known for: educator, performer, musician, humanitarian, storyteller

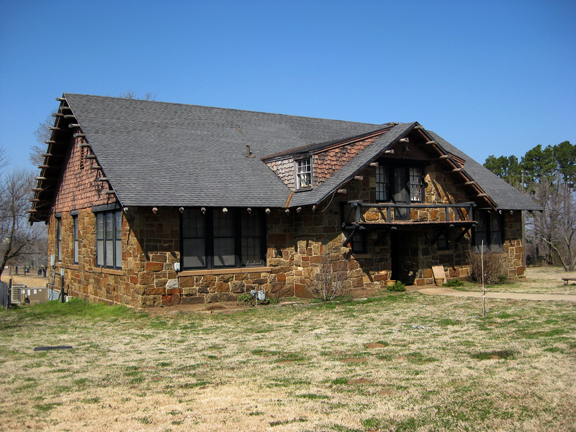
Ataloa Lodge Museum (2010) at Bacone College, Muskogee, Oklahoma

Mary Ataloa Stone McLendon (1896–1967) was a Native American musician, storyteller, humanitarian, and educator, who was a citizen of the Chickasaw Nation. McLendon was an important figure in Native American arts education. She was a concert vocalist, known for her contralto voice. She was influential in the creation of the art department at Bacone College, serving as the first director.

== Early life, education, and performance ==
Mary Kuth Stone was born on March 27, 1896, near Duncan, Chickasaw Nation in Indian Territory. She one of four children born to William Stone and Josephine McLish Smith, her father was European-American and her mother was Chickasaw, with a quarter blood quantum. She is listed as 1/8th Chickasaw by Blood on the Dawes Rolls. She attended Stone School, a small school named after her paternal family. Her maternal grandmother Nancy Love McLish Smith, named her "Ataloa", which in the Chickasaw language translates as "song", "little song", or "anthem".

In 1917 she married Ralph McClendon at the age of 17, however he died a year later of the Spanish flu. She had been attending the Oklahoma College for Women. After her husband died she moved to Redlands, California, to be near her mother and brother. She graduated in 1925 from the University of Redlands. Around 1925, she used the stage name "Ataloa" or "Princess Ataloa" and started to dress in identifiably Native American clothing. McLendon created this romanticized image of an "Indian Princess", in order to play to her mostly white audience. She gained popularity for her performances featuring Native American dance, and she was known for her contralto singing voice. She would tell Native American stories and oral history, as well as conclude the events by speaking about the issues facing the Native American communities in her public appearances.

After graduation she moved to New York City to continue her studies at Columbia University, and by 1928 she shared an apartment with Chickasaw actress Te Ata. McLendon referred to Te Ata as her "cousin", however it is unknown if they were related or if they knew each other prior to living in New York City. She earned her master's degree in religious education from Columbia University in 1927.

== Teaching ==
In the summer of 1927, McLendon moved to Muskogee, Oklahoma to begin teaching at an American Indian Baptist college, Bacone College. Initially, she taught English at the school but she also raised money in order to build a new art building on campus. With the new building in place by 1932, fine art became part of the school's curriculum, and McLendon served as the first director of the program. McLendon accrued Native American art, building an art collection for the school which was housed in the new building. When she left the school in 1935, artist Acee Blue Eagle (Muscogee) served as the second art department director.

McLendon taught at the newly founded, Idyllwild School of Music and Arts from 1950 until 1963.

== Humanitarian efforts ==
Prior to 1932, McLendon secured funds from John D. Rockefeller in order to build a Native American orphans' home in Muskogee, Oklahoma, which became the Murrow Indian Children's Home, still in operation today.

During the 1940s, McLendon worked with the War Relocation Authority in order to assist with the relocation of Japanese people living in the United States during World War II in internment camps.

In the 1950s, she served on the Save the Children Foundation committee to help Navajo Nation families fight against malnutrition complicated by a tuberculosis outbreak. Also in 1950s, McLendon was a public relations chair for the National Congress of American Indians and a consultant for the Bureau of Indian Affairs.

== Death and legacy ==
McLendon died on November 11, 1967, in Santa Monica, California, after a long illness.

On the Bacone College campus, the Ataloa Lodge Museum is a building dedicated to McLendon. This is the same building built in 1932 by McLendon as an "art lodge" and classroom, it was later renamed in her dedication and it now houses a collection of Native American art work and historical artifacts.

At the Idyllwild Arts Academy, on campus there is a marker in her dedication, an art studio named the Ataloa Art Studio and a nearby group of Sequoia trees were named the Ataloa Grove.

East Central University in Ada, Oklahoma opened the Hallie Brown Ford Arts Center's Ataloa Theatre in 2009.

== See also ==
- Hote’ Casella
