= Franklin Gritts =

Keetoowah Cherokee artist, teacher and art director (1914–1996)

- Oau Nah Jusah
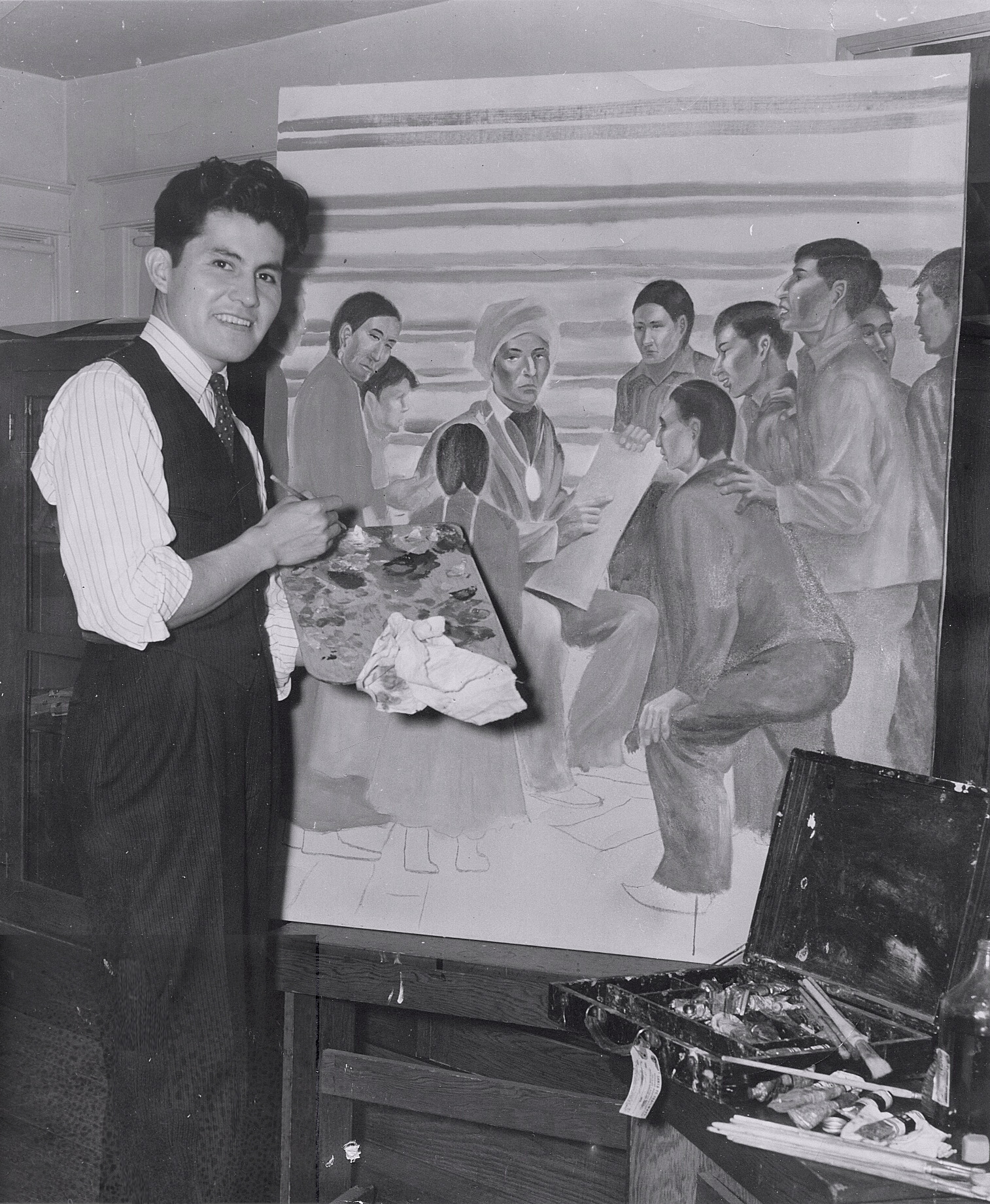
- Franklin Gritts painting Sequoyah, 1941
- Born: August 8, 1914; Vian, Oklahoma, US
- Died: November 8, 1996 (aged 82)
- Resting place: Jefferson Barracks National Cemetery
- Citizenship: United Keetoowah Band; American
- Education: Bacone College; University of Oklahoma, 1939
- Occupations: Artist; teacher; art director
- Spouse: Geraldine Monroe (m. 1940; died 1986)
- Awards: Purple Heart

Franklin Gritts (Cherokee: Oau Nah Jusah, They Have Returned; August 8, 1914 – November 8, 1996) was a Keetoowah Cherokee artist, teacher and art director. Gritts' is best known for his contributions to the "Golden Era" of Native American art, both as a teacher and an artist. During World War II, he served on the USS Franklin (CV-13), the most damaged ship in the history of the U.S. Navy to return to port. He survived a devastating attack on March 19, 1945, but suffered injuries, earning the Purple Heart. Gritts' later worked as the art director for the Sporting News.

== Early life ==
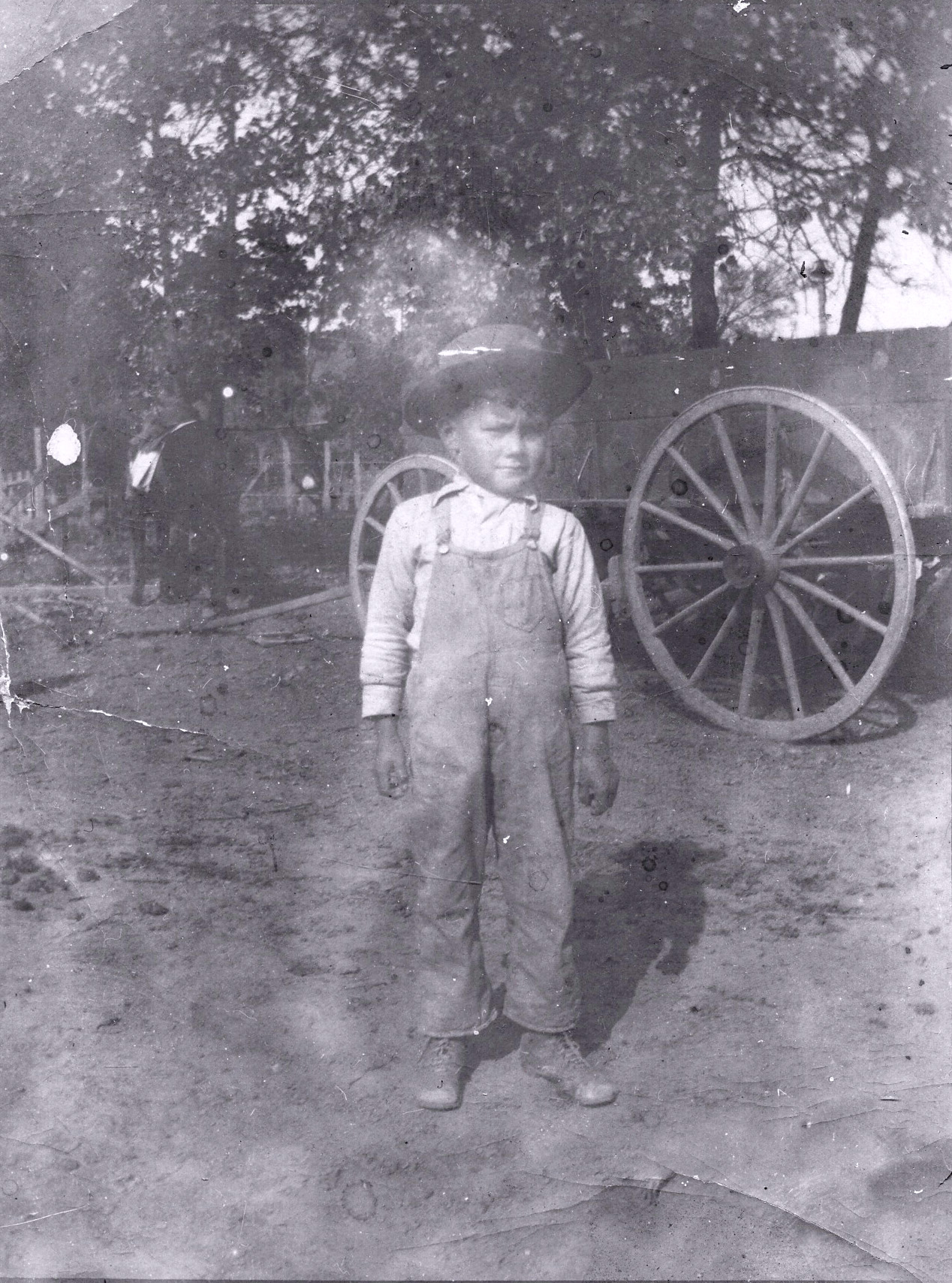
Franklin Gritts at the age of five years

Gritts was born in Vian, Oklahoma, on August 8, 1914. His father, George Gritts, a full-blood Cherokee whose name is on the Dawes Roll, was a traditionalist and attended Cherokee religious ceremonies in the Cookson Hills . His mother was Rachel Gritts (née Duck), a full-blood Cherokee who is also listed in the Dawes Roll. George's father, Anderson (A.W.) Gritts, was an officer of the Eastern Emigrant and Western Cherokee Association and supported lobbying efforts in Washington D.C. for the Cherokees regarding land and oil rights early in the 20th century. This association was a divergent of the Original Keetoowah Society, a religious and cultural traditionist group with roots going back to the 1850s. The Eastern Emigrant and Western Cherokee Association held one of its meetings at George Gritts’ farm over several days in August 1920, with people arriving on foot, horseback, in wagons, and a few in cars. They set up a camp in his fields. Gritts’ first memory is of this event as he thought all these people had come for his fifth birthday on August 8.

Rachel and George were not eager to send their only child to school in Vian, as they had lost several children through miscarriages and early childhood death. They kept Gritts at home until he was eight years old. School authorities finally insisted that he attend school and his parents reluctantly agreed. Although he could speak little English and was older than the other first-graders, he loved school from the beginning. Thanks to capable and caring teachers, he was able to catch up with his age group after a couple of years. The majority of the students were non-Indian but they quickly made friends with the shy newcomer. Gritts showed an early talent for art and this ability added to his popularity. By the time he reached high school, Gritts was active in sports and had bridged the gap between his home and his school life.

== College ==
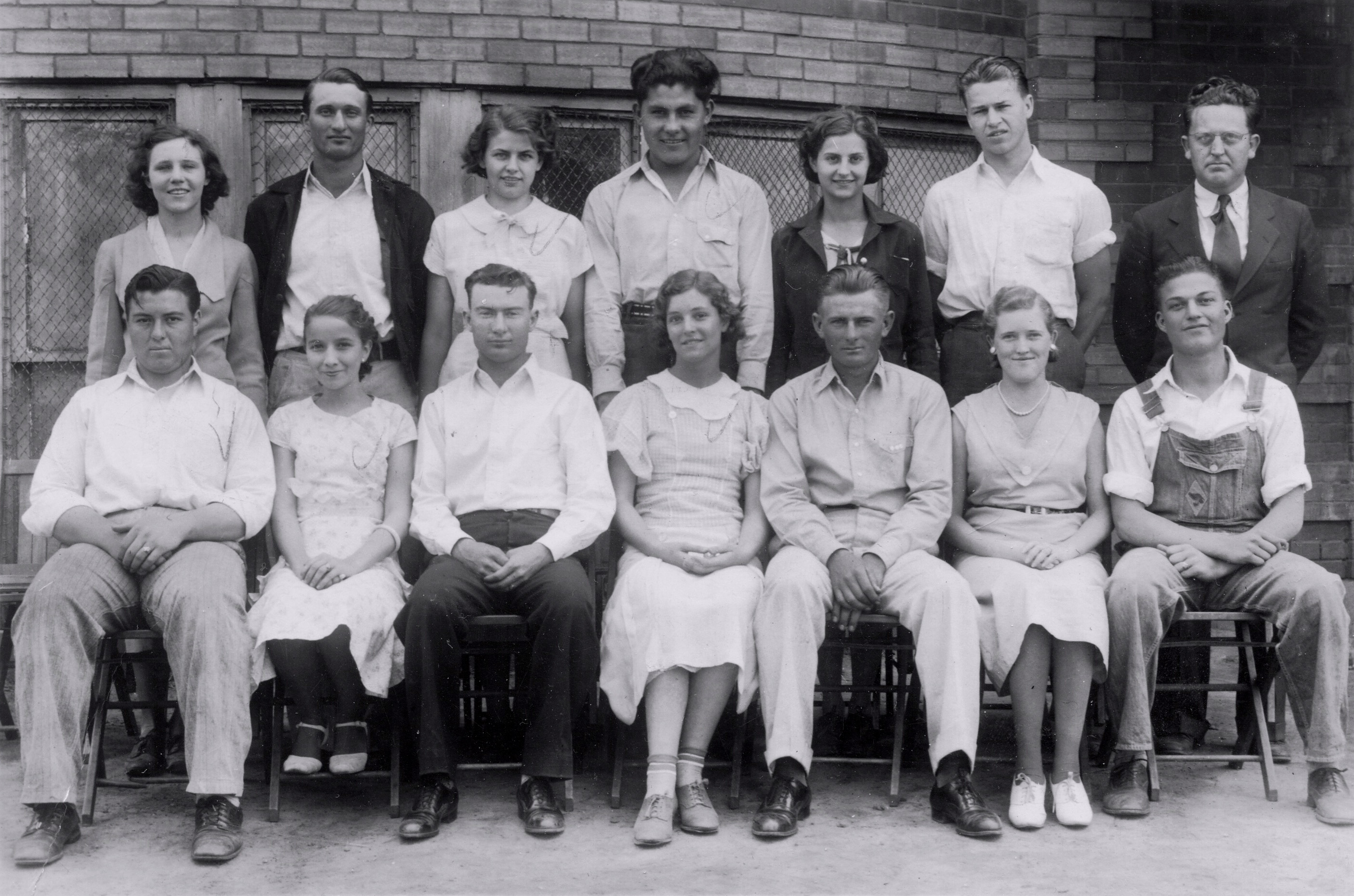
Senior class Vian High School (Gritts is fourth from left, back row)

When Gritts was a high school senior, officials from the Bureau of Indian Affairs interviewed him and offered to recommend him to Bacone College, at that time a Baptist junior college for qualified Indian students located in nearby Muskogee, Oklahoma. He readily accepted and spent two years at Bacone College, where Indian art was an important part of the curriculum. He advanced so well in his artwork and other studies that the Bureau of Indian Affairs offered him a loan to attend the University of Oklahoma at Norman, Oklahoma. This was a big leap to contemplate, from being part of a small, comfortable college close to home to tackling the huge and overwhelming state university. He did not hesitate, however, because he realized what a great opportunity it was. The country was in the grip of the Great Depression and money was very scarce, almost non-existent in rural Oklahoma. He could never have aspired to enroll at the university without the government loan and the encouragement of the recruiters from the Indian Service.

The dean of the School of Fine Arts at the university, Dr. O. B. Jacobson, was a Swedish-American man who appreciated American Indian art and valued his Native American students. Nevertheless, he held them to the high standards of the fine arts curriculum and granted them no special concessions. He encouraged them to develop their Indian art as an independent assignment. Thus, Gritts took portrait painting, figure painting, art appreciation, and other facets of fine art as well as the required general courses.

Gritts graduated with a Bachelor of Fine Arts' degree in painting in 1939. In June 1940, he married Geraldine Monroe whom he had met as at the University of Oklahoma.

== Teaching ==
After graduating, Gritts took a teaching position at the Fort Sill Indian School in Anadarko, Oklahoma. After a year there, he transferred to Haskell Institute in Lawrence, Kansas, where he taught American Indian art in the high school and two-year post-high school divisions. This was quite an advancement for Gritts, since Haskell was a prominent American Indian school, attracting students from many different tribes and numerous states. He taught small classes and was able to give individual attention to his students.

In addition to teaching, Gritts painted murals in various buildings on the Haskell campus. He was commissioned to do an oil portrait of Peter Graves, a noted Red Lake Ojibwe chief, to be placed in a US Navy ship.

== World War II ==
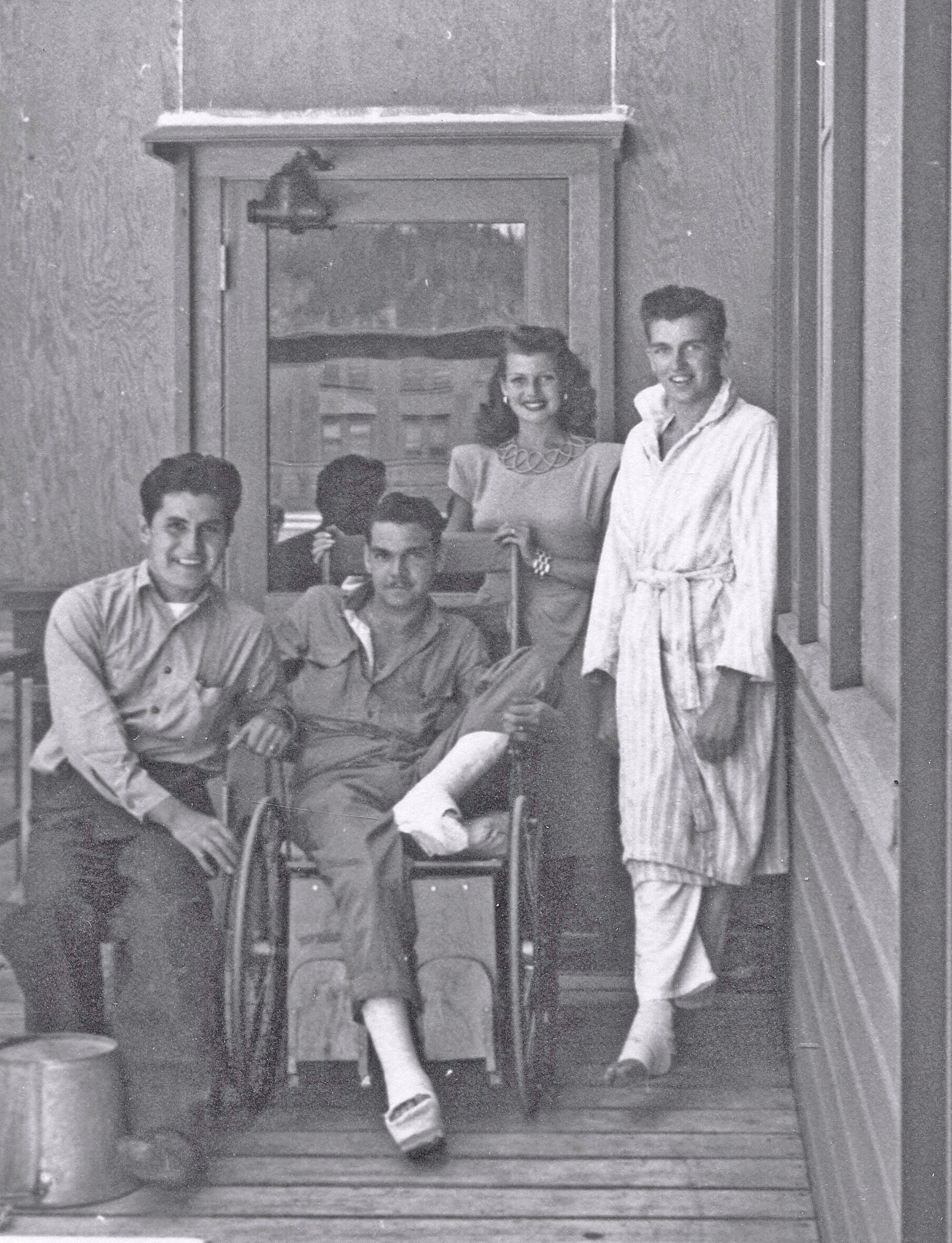
Movie star, Rita Hayworth, visiting Gritts' hospital ward during World War II (Gritts is on the left)

This part of his career did not last long. The United States entered World War II and in 1943, Gritts left sheltered campus life as he entered the Navy. First, he was sent to the inland training base at Farragut, Idaho, for basic training and then to Pensacola, Florida, for aerial photography school, a new field for him, but one that separated him from his Indian art. Never again did he pursue Indian art as a full-time occupation in spite of his recognized talent in this area.

After Pensacola, he was assigned to the USS Franklin (CV-13), an aircraft carrier operating in the Pacific theater of the war. He boarded ship at Oakland, California, and it slowly made its way toward the shore of Japan. En route, he took pictures and developed them in the darkroom. He also did occasional artwork such as lettering, illustrations, sign painting and airbrush work.

The USS Franklin served at the Bonin and Mariana Islands; Peleliu; and Leyte. Then on March 19, 1945, fifty miles off the shore of Japan, the ship was preparing for the attack on the Japanese homeland. The deck was covered with fully fueled aircraft and the already bombs loaded on them. Suddenly, a Japanese plane appeared and dropped two bombs. One bomb struck the flight deck centerline, penetrating to the hangar deck, effecting destruction and igniting fires through the second and third decks, and knocking out the Combat Information Center and air plot. The second hit aft, tearing through two decks.

798 sailors and Marines were killed. It was the worst disaster the U.S. Navy had ever sustained. Miraculously, the ship did not sink, although it was heavily damaged and thought to be destroyed. Because of its service in the previous "hot spots" and this attack, the crew of the USS Franklin became the most decorated crew in the history of the US Navy.

Gritts was in a passageway near the deck when the ship was hit and was wounded in the left leg and foot by shrapnel. He managed to climb out of a porthole into the sea below and was picked up by a life raft of other survivors. They spent a cold night on the raft, drifting away from the stricken ship and, as the sun set, saw it disappear on the horizon, listing badly. Shortly after daylight, they were rescued by a destroyer and Gritts received some basic first aid. He also began his long "hitch-hike" across the Pacific, being transferred to any ship heading home to the United States. Unfortunately, some of these ships were ordered back into the fighting zone and he had to be re-routed when a ship going out of the area appeared.

His transfers from ship to ship on the turbulent seas were accomplished by heavy cable anchored on each ship. His stretcher was attached to the cables and he was pulled over the water. Finally arriving in Hawaii, Gritts was able to call home just as the news of the Franklin disaster was announced, after a long period of censorship. In Hawaii, he received his first extensive medical treatment, which revealed that an infection had set in the tibia bone of his left leg, and he had lost a toe on that foot. After a couple of weeks, he set sail again, this time on a hospital ship headed for Oakland, where he was transferred to a hospital train for Farragut, Idaho, the training camp which had been turned into a hospital. He was a patient in this hospital for more than a year, during which time the war ended.

Gritts faced more medical treatment at the Great Lakes Hospital in Chicago as the infection in the tibia continued to drain and would not heal. To pass the time during his hospital stay, he developed a style of modern illustration and cartoons for the amusement of his fellow patients. Some of his work was published in service publications.

Upon his recovery and release from Great Lakes, he returned to Haskell in 1947 He was released from service on September 19, 1947, after it was deemed he had recovered enough from his wounds. The nation was still in the process of rebuilding after WWII, when home construction and civilian manufacturing had been converted to the production of war materials of all kinds. The waves of returning veterans were being retrained for civilian life, many of them attending college under the G.I. Bill.

== Return to teaching ==
At Haskell, the atmosphere was charged with the excitement of the times. The traditional Academic Department remained much the same, but the Business and Vocational Departments were responding to the demands of the modern world. The Indian students flocking in from around the nation needed to "Learn to Earn."

Gritts could see the need for commercial art training for talented students and transformed his classes accordingly. He did, however, continue to help and encourage serious students of Indian art to pursue this interest. He also continued his own passion for photography. With no blueprint to follow, he developed a commercial art curriculum. He spent one summer at the Art Institute of Chicago and took after-school classes at the University of Kansas to attain state teaching certification. Haskell was upgrading its status to become a member of the North Central Association of Colleges and Schools.

One of Gritts’ students after the war was Adam Fortunate Eagle Nordwall. He said it was a turning point when Gritts returned after the war and began teaching commercial art. Adam Fortunate Eagle was able to find employment as a commercial artist with the skills he learned at Haskel. Years later in 1968, Adam Fortunate Eagle was named by the FBI as the principal organizer of the Indian occupation of Alcatraz after it ceased being used as a prison by the federal government.

== Sporting News ==
After five years at Haskell, Gritts decided to try his own hand at commercial art. Housing was tight on campus, where employees were required to live, and he felt the possibilities inadequate for his growing family which would eventually include a daughter, Dara Stillman, and two sons, Bob Gritts and Galen Gritts. He resigned his position and moved his family to St. Louis, Missouri. He answered a newspaper advertisement for the position of art director of The Sporting News in 1955.

Established in 1886, The Sporting News was a newspaper distributed nationwide about baseball; it became known as the "Baseball Bible." In 1955, a monthly magazine was established: The Sporting Goods Dealer is a glossy, full-color trade magazine for sporting goods stores.

Gritts’ work on the paper involved pasting up articles, photographs, and ads for each page, and original artwork on the front page. The weekly deadlines were crucial, but he always managed to get the paper out on time. He also prepared The Sporting Goods Dealer for publication each month.

== Death ==
Gritts died on November 8, 1996, and is buried at Jefferson Barracks National Cemetery.

== Legacy ==
Among others, First Lady Eleanor Roosevelt bought one of Gritts’ paintings. Gritts’ art is displayed at the Gilcrease Museum and the Philbrook Museum of Art in Tulsa, Oklahoma. It is also in the collection of at the Fred Jones Jr. Museum of Art, University of Oklahoma, National Cowboy & Western Heritage Museum, Oklahoma City, and the Muskogee Public Library, Muskogee, Oklahoma.

Gritts painted a large mural on four walls gracing the entrance to the auditorium at Haskell Indian Nations University. His oil painting of the great Sequoyah, who invented the Cherokee syllabary, is located there as well. The appreciation of Native American art which Gritts help to establish continues at Haskell to this day. Currently, Haskell Indian Art Market, a festival of two days, draws 30,000 people.

He illustrated the back cover of Grant Foreman's The Five Civilized Tribes: a Brief History and a Century of Progress, published in 1948. Some of Gritts’ work resides in private collections. The Cherokee, A New True Book, by Emilie U. Lepthien, published in 1985, calls Gritts a famous Cherokee.

His 1950, "Stomp Dance" was included in C. Szwedzicki's "The North American Indian Works" which is a collection of 364 images and six texts. Between 1929 and 1952 C. Szwedzicki, a publisher in Nice, France, produced six portfolios of North American Indian art. The publications were edited by American scholars Oscar Brousse Jacobson, Hartley Burr Alexander and Kenneth M. Chapman. Many of the images were published as pochoir prints which are similar in appearance to silk screen prints. These works represent original works by 20th Century American Indian artists.

In 2009, Gritts' Indian Woman Grinding Corn (1936, Tempera, Courtesy of Fred Jones Jr. Museum of Art, the University of Oklahoma, Norman, Oklahoma: Museum purchase, 1937) was on display in Cotonou, Benin in West Africa as part of the program Art in Embassies. For five decades, Art in Embassies (AIE) has played a leading role in U.S. public diplomacy through a focused mission of vital cross-cultural dialogue and understanding through the visual arts and dynamic artist exchange.
