= Acee Blue Eagle =

Native American artist, educator, dancer (1907–1959)

- Cepon Vpelē (Creek); Lvmhe Holattē (Creek)
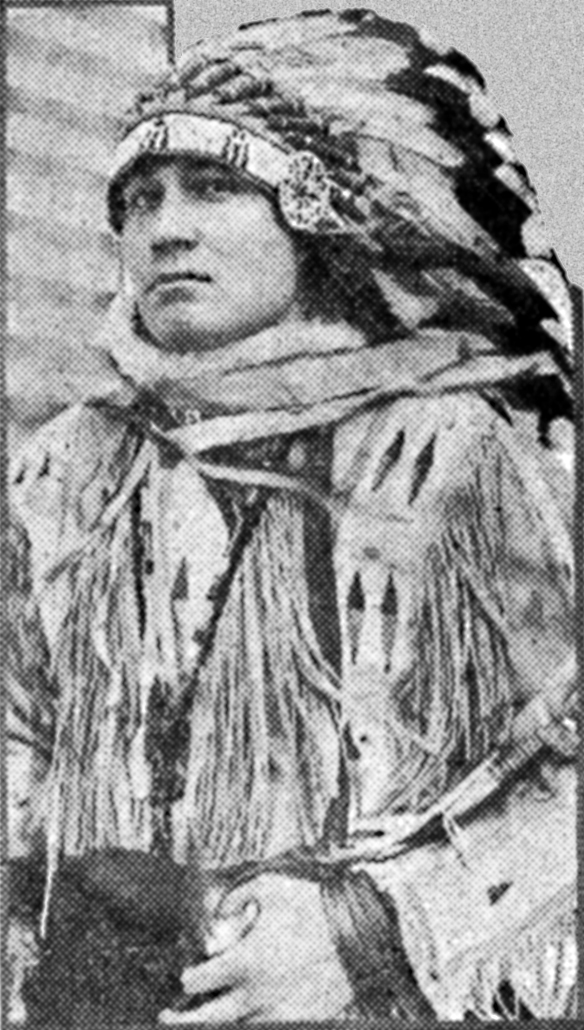
- Born: Alexander C. McIntosh; August 16, 1907; North of Anadarko, Territory of Oklahoma
- Died: June 18, 1959 (aged 51); Muskogee, Oklahoma
- Resting place: Fort Gibson National Cemetery
- Education: Bacone College, University of Oklahoma
- Occupations: Artist, educator, dancer, and Native American flute player.
- Employer(s): Bacone College, self
- Organization(s): United States Army Air Corps, Bacone College
- Known for: Directing the art program at Bacone College
- Notable work: Murals in the dining hall of the USS Oklahoma (BB-37) and U.S. Post Office at Seminole, Oklahoma
- Style: Bacone style
- Spouse: Devi Dja (divorced)
- Partner: Mae Wadley Abbott
- Parent(s): Solomon McIntosh, mother was Martha "Mattie" Odom
- Relatives: Second cousin, Muscogee/Seminole artist Fred Beaver; cousin, Howard Rufus Collins, who painted under the name Ducee Blue Buzzard
- Awards: Indian Hall of Fame, Who's Who of Oklahoma, International Who's Who, "Outstanding Indian in the United States", 1958; received a medal for eight paintings at the National Museum of Ethiopia

Acee Blue Eagle (17 August 1907 – 18 June 1959) was a Native American artist, educator, dancer, and Native American flute player, who directed the art program at Bacone College. His birth name was Alexander C. McIntosh, he also went by Chebon Ahbulah (Creek: Cepon Vpelē; Laughing Boy), and Lumhee Holot-Tee (Creek: Lvmhe Holattē; Blue Eagle), and was an enrolled member of the Muscogee (Creek) Nation.

== Early life and education ==
Alexander C. McIntosh was born north of Anadarko, Oklahoma on August 17, 1907; however, his birth year is also given as 1909. His father was Solomon McIntosh (Muscogee), and his mother was Martha "Mattie" Odom McIntosh. His Muscogee Creek great-grandfather served as a chief for 31 years.

Blue Eagle studied Haskell Institute, Lawrence, Kansas, and then Chilocco Indian Agricultural School, where he earned his high school diploma in 1928. He began college at Bacone College in Muskogee and then studied art at University of Oklahoma (OU) in Norman in 1932. While at OU, Blue Eagle studied painting under Oscar B. Jacobson, known for popularizing "Flatstyle" painting.

Blue Eagle served for three years in the United States Army Air Corps during World War II.

== Teaching career ==
Blue Eagle joined the art department at Bacone College in 1935, where he directed the program until 1938 and helped shaped development of the Bacone style of painting and grow the department. After the war, he taught at Oklahoma State Technical School in Okmulgee.

== Art career ==
Blue Eagle's work was part of the painting event in the art competition at the 1932 Summer Olympics.

In 1935, Blue Eagle was invited to give a series of lectures on American Indian art at Oxford University in England. By 1938, his work had become nationally recognized, and he had a solo exhibition at the Grand Central Art Galleries in New York City.

From 1936 to 1937, the Fred Jones Jr. Museum of Art in Norman exhibited the solo show, Acee Blue Eagle, Bacone, water-colors. In the 1940s, he created a number of works for his friend, the collector Thomas Gilcrease. Blue Eagle gained worldwide fame during his lifetime, and his two-dimensional paintings hang in private and public galleries all over the world.

Blue Eagle was well known for painting large interior murals, some of which are still preserved in Oklahoma, for the New Deal art projects. In 1934 he was invited to join the Public Works of Art Project; one of his murals was in the dining hall of the USS Oklahoma (BB-37). He was commissioned to paint two murals for classrooms in the health and physical education building of Oklahoma College for Women, now the University of Science and Arts of Oklahoma, in Chickasha, Oklahoma. He completed PWAP murals at other Oklahoma colleges, including one in the auditorium of Central State College (now University of Central Oklahoma in Edmond) and in the administration building of Northeastern State Teachers College (now Northeastern State University in Tahlequah).

For the Section of Painting and Sculpture, Blue Eagle painted United States post office murals in Seminole, Oklahoma (1939) and Coalgate, Oklahoma (1942). Fred Beaver, a Muscogee Creek/Seminole artist, restored Blue Eagle's Coalgate mural in 1965.

Blue Eagle's work was part of Stretching the Canvas: Eight Decades of Native Painting (2019–2021), a survey at the National Museum of the American Indian George Gustav Heye Center.

== Awards and honors ==
Blue Eagle was elected into the Indian Hall of Fame, Who's Who of Oklahoma, and the International Who's Who. He was chosen "Outstanding Indian in the United States" in 1958. Among his many honors, Blue Eagle received a medal for eight paintings at the National Museum of Ethiopia, presented by the Emperor Haile Selassie I. Fellow Oklahoma artist and muralist Charles Banks Wilson said of Blue Eagle, "Acee was the Dale Carnegie of Indian Art. Curator and art historian Jeanne O. Snodgrass wrote in 1968, "If Oklahoma has a foundation in Indian Art, it is with Acee Blue Eagle."

== Personal ==
Blue Eagle was briefly married to Indonesian American actress Devi Dja.

Blue Eagle's cousin was painter Solomon McCombs (Muscogee/Seminole). Another cousin, Howard Rufus Collins, painted under the name Ducee Blue Buzzard, as a parody of Acee's name.

== Death and legacy ==
Acee Blue Eagle died on June 18, 1959, and is buried at Fort Gibson National Cemetery in Fort Gibson, Oklahoma.

Tamara Liegerot Elder published a biography of the artist: Lumhee Holot-tee: The Art and Life of Acee Blue Eagle, in 2006 through Medicine Wheel Press.

At Haskell Indian Nations University, a business administration building is named Blue Eagle Hall in his honor.
