= Shawnee Tribe =

Native American tribe in Oklahoma, United States

Total population
- 2,226

Regions with significant populations
- United States (Oklahoma)

Languages
- Shawnee, English

Religion
- Christianity, Native American Church, traditional tribal religion

Related ethnic groups
- other Shawnee tribes and the Sauk people

The Shawnee Tribe is a federally recognized Native American tribe in Oklahoma. Formerly known as the Loyal Shawnee, they are one of three federally recognized Shawnee tribes. The others are the Absentee-Shawnee Tribe of Indians of Oklahoma and the Eastern Shawnee Tribe of Oklahoma.

== Government ==
The headquarters of the Shawnee Tribe is Miami, Oklahoma. Currently, there are about 2,226 enrolled tribal citizens, with 1,070 of them living within the state of Oklahoma.

As of 2025, the current administration is:

- Chief: Ben Barnes
- Second Chief: Roy Baldridge
- Treasurer: Mark McDowell
- Secretary: Carolyn Foster
- Business Council Seat 1: John Sparkman
- Business Council Seat 2: Diana McLean
- Business Council Seat 3: Drew Dixon
- Business Council Seat 4: Corey Winesburg
- Business Council Seat 5: Monty Coombes
- Business Council Seat 6: Lee Bluejacket
- Business Council Seat 7: Keni Hood

Previously, Ron Sparkman was the elected chairman, serving a four-year term.

== Economic development ==
The Shawnee Tribe issues its own tribal vehicle tags. It operates its own housing authority as well as a tribal smoke shop, the Shawnee Trails Gift Shop and Gallery, Shawnee Development LLC, and Shawnee Heritage Government Solutions. Their annual economic impact is estimated by the Oklahoma Indian Affairs Commissions to be $3 million. Shawnee Development LLC is an economic development corporation established in 2001, owned by the tribe but conducting business separately from the general government functions. The Shawnee Journal is a newspaper published by the tribe and distributed at no cost to all tribal citizens.

== Culture ==
Some traditional ceremonies, such as the Spring and Fall Bread Dance, the Green Corn ceremony, and stomp dances are still held. These take place at the ceremonial ground in White Oak, Oklahoma. Some Shawnees belong to the Native American Church and participate in peyote ceremonies, mostly in the winter which is outside of the traditional Shawnee ceremonial cycle.

== History ==
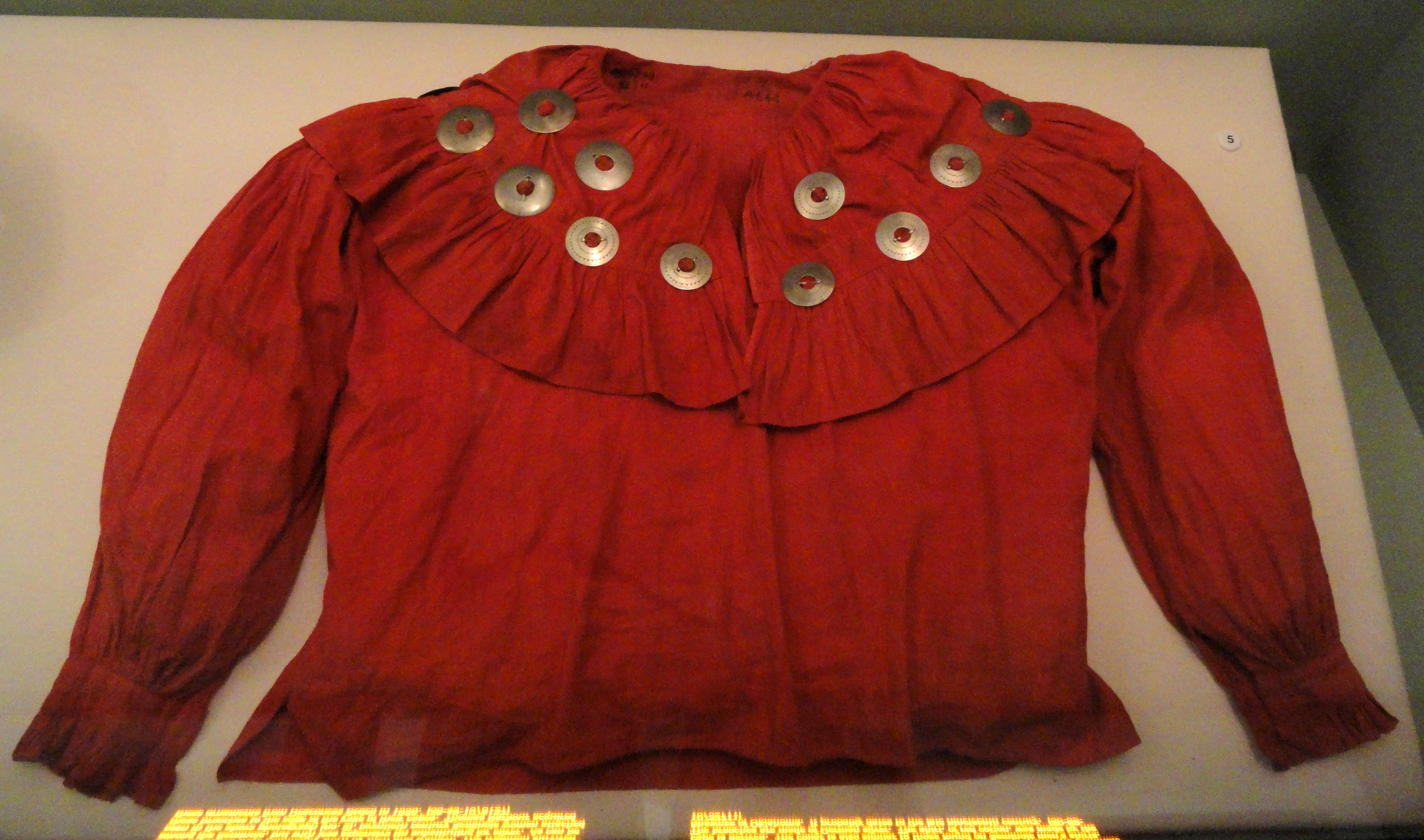
Shawnee woman's blouse with silver medallions, circa 19th century, Indian Territory (Oklahoma), collection of the Peabody Museum, Harvard

The Shawnee Tribe is an Indigenous people of the Northeastern Woodlands. They originally came from Ohio and Pennsylvania, and were the last of the Shawnee to leave their traditional homelands there. In the late 18th century, European American encroachment crowded Shawnee lands in the East, and one band migrated to Missouri — eventually becoming the Absentee Shawnee. Three reservations were granted to the Shawnee in Ohio by the 1817 Treaty of Fort Meigs: Wapakoneta, Lewistown, and Hog Creek. After the Indian Removal Act of 1830 passed, another Shawnee band, which would become the Eastern Shawnee Tribe relocated to Indian Territory in July 1831. The final band, who would become the Shawnee Tribe, relocated to Kansas in August 1831. Their Kansas lands were drastically reduced in 1854 and broken up into individual allotments in 1858.

During the American Civil War, many of the Shawnee Tribe fought for the Union, which inspired the name, "Loyal Shawnee." Instead of receiving compensation or honors for their service, they returned to their Kansas lands, only to find much of it taken over by non-Indian homesteaders. Settlers were granted 130,000 acres (530 km^{2}) of Shawnee land, while 70,000 acres (280 km^{2}) remained to for the tribe, of which 20,000 acres (81 km^{2}) were granted to the Absentee Shawnee.

=== Cherokee Shawnee (1869 – 1980s) ===
In 1861 Kansas became a state, and the white people of Kansas demanded that all Indian tribes must be removed from the state. The Loyal Shawnee made an agreement with the Cherokee Nation in 1869, allowing 722 to gain citizenship within the Cherokee tribe and receive allotments of Cherokee land. They predominantly settled in what is now Craig and Rogers County, Oklahoma. They became known as the "Cherokee Shawnee," primarily settling in the areas of Bird Creek (now known as Sperry); Hudson Creek (now known as Fairland); and White Oak. The Shawnee Reservation in Kansas was never legally dissolved and some Shawnee families still hold their allotment lands in Kansas.

=== Re-independence ===
Beginning in the 1980s, the Shawnee Tribe began an effort to regain their own tribal status, independent of the Cherokee Nation. Congress passed Public Law 106-568, the Shawnee Tribe Status Act of 2000, and the Shawnee Tribe was able to organize as their own autonomous, federally recognized tribe. James R. Squirrel was the initial Chairman and was recognized by the AARP in 2009, as being instrumental in the Shawnee Tribe being federally recognized.

== Notable Loyal Shawnee ==
- Heidi BigKnife, jeweler, silversmith
- Ruthe Blalock Jones, painter, printmaker, and arts educator
- Yvonne Chouteau, prima ballerina.
- Timmy Lee Jr, Texas Blues Rock guitarist.

== See also ==
- Black Bob
