= Woody Crumbo =

Native American artist from Oklahoma (1912–1989)

Woodrow "Woody" Crumbo
- Born: January 31, 1912 near Lexington, Oklahoma
- Died: April 4, 1989 (aged 77); Cimarron, New Mexico
- Resting place: Okmulgee, Oklahoma
- Citizenship: Citizen Potawatomi Nation AND American
- Education: University of Oklahoma
- Notable work: The Rainbow Trail mural (1943)
- Movement: Bacone School
- Children: Minisa Crumbo Halsey
- Awards: Oklahoma Hall of Fame (1978)
- Patrons: Thomas Gilcrease

Woodrow Wilson Crumbo (1912—1989) was a Native American artist and educator from Oklahoma. He was a citizen of the Citizen Potawatomi Nation. Traveling and performing extensively, he danced and played Native American flute.

Crumbo was also an independent prospector in New Mexico in the late 1950s, who found one of the largest beryllium veins in the nation, valued at millions of dollars.

His paintings are held by several major museums, including the Smithsonian Institution and the Metropolitan Museum of Art, with a large collection at the Gilcrease Museum in Tulsa, Oklahoma and a small collection at the Montana museum of art and culture .

== Early life and education ==
Woodrow Wilson Crumbo was born on January 31, 1912, near Lexington, Oklahoma. His mother was Mary Ann Herd Crumbo (Citizen Potawatomi, 1871–1920) of Sand Springs, Oklahoma. His father was Alexander Crumbo (1855–1932). After his mother died in 1920, he lived with different Muscogee families around Sand Springs, Oklahoma. After going blind, his father moved back to Indiana to live with his sister.

Crumbo attended Riverside Indian School in Anadarko, Oklahoma. When Crumbo was 17, he began studying art at the Chilocco Indian Agricultural School, also taking up the study of the Native American flute. Later he soloed on this instrument in performance with the Wichita Symphony.

At the age of 19, Crumbo earned a scholarship to the American Indian Institute in Wichita, Kansas, where he graduated as valedictorian. He continued his studies at Wichita University from 1933 to 1936, where he studied mural technique with Olle Nordmark, watercolor with Clayton Staples, and painting and drawing with Oscar Jacobson. In 1936 Crumbo enrolled at the University of Oklahoma, where he studied for two years with Oscar Jacobson.

== Performing career ==
While studying art, Crumbo supported himself as a Native American dancer. He toured Indian reservations across the United States in the early 1930s disseminating and studying tribal dances.

== Visual art career ==
Land of Enchantment (1946), painting by Woody Crumbo, collection of the Philbrook Museum of Art

His art career was affirmed when Susie Peters, his mentor from his days at the Chilocco Indian School sold a number of his paintings to the San Francisco Museum of Art. Subsequently, Crumbo joined the Bacone College in Muskogee as Director of Art from 1938 to 1941, succeeding Acee Blue Eagle (Muscogee).

In 1939, the United States Treasury Department commissioned him to paint murals on the walls of its building in Washington, D.C. A few years later he curated a collection of Native American art at the Thomas Gilcrease Institute in Tulsa. Crumbo's peyote bird design became the logo for the Gilcrease Museum.

In 1943, Crumbo was commissioned to paint The Rainbow Trail in the Notawa post office. He was commissioned to paint two murals in the U.S.S. Oklahoma, which were both destroyed when the battleship was attacked and sunk at Pearl Harbor.

From 1948 to 1960, Crumbo lived in Taos, New Mexico. He exhibited at numerous shows and became more widely known both nationally and internationally because he adapted some of his work to techniques of engraving and printing, making multiple originals.

In 1973 he moved near Checotah, Oklahoma, where he continued to create and to promote Native American art.

== Prospecting ==
In the 1950s, Crumbo bought a $3 mail-order mineral identification kit; he took up prospecting with fellow artist Max Evans. The two found deposits of ore worth millions, including a vein of beryllium that the New Mexico School of Mines identified at the time as "among the greatest beryllium finds in the nation." Crumbo became "a major stockholder in Taos Uranium and Exploration Corp. that was formed by a group of Texas investors to develop the claims" for beryllium and copper.

== Museum career ==
With his first interest as art, Crumbo served as assistant director of the El Paso Museum of Art in Texas from 1960 to 1967 and briefly as director in 1968.

== Native advocacy ==
He left to work independently at art and explore humanitarian efforts. He aided the Isleta Pueblo Indians of New Mexico to gain federal recognition and donated money to help the Citizen Potawatomi build a cultural heritage center in Shawnee.

== Honors ==
Crumbo was inducted into the Oklahoma Hall of Fame for his artistic practice in 1978. Governor George Nigh appointed him as an "ambassador of good will" for Oklahoma in 1982.

Crumbo's work was part of Stretching the Canvas: Eight Decades of Native Painting (2019–2021), a survey at the National Museum of the American Indian George Gustav Heye Center.

== Death ==
Crumbo moved to Cimarron, New Mexico in 1988, and died there in 1989. His body was returned for burial in Okmulgee, Oklahoma.
