= Pashofa =

Chickasaw and Choctaw white corn soup

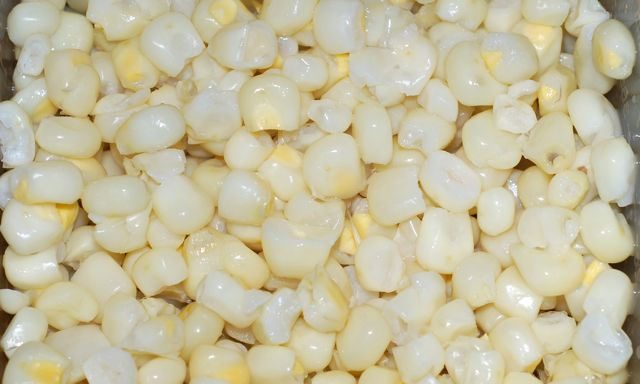
- Sweet white corn
- Type: Stew
- Course: Main
- Place of origin: United States
- Region or state: Southeastern Woodlands
- Created by: Chickasaw and Choctaw people
- Main ingredients: White hominy maize
- Variations: Salt, pork

Pashofa, or pishofa, is a Chickasaw and Choctaw soupy dish made from cracked white corn, also known as pearl hominy. The dish is one of the most important to the Chickasaw people and has been served at ceremonial and social events for centuries. Pashofa was also used in specific healing ceremonies.

== Preparation and serving ==
Traditionally, dried corn was ground in a mortar into cornmeal and cooked in a pot with water. Finely cut pieces of young piglet or calf meat were added. The dish was served cold and could keep up to a month.

The pashofa is cooked over a low heat for many hours.

Specialized paddles and spoons, carved from wood or animal horns, were used in stirring, serving, and eating pashofa. Several of these are currently in the collection of the Smithsonian Institution. Pashofa was cooked in giant bowls, often over an open fire outdoors.

== Pashofa Dance ==
The Pashofa Dance is a healing ceremony among the Chickasaw and Choctaw. A sick person could be left in a room, alone except for a medicine man. A striped black and white pole is placed in the sick person's yard, and no one else walks past the pole. While the medicine man says a medicinal formula over the sick person to drive out the "Spirit of Disease called Shulop," others dance outside. Midday, pashofa is served to all the dancers, while it is still warm, along with water to drink. A second round of dancing ensues. Pashofa dances have also been performed indoors.

== See also ==
- List of maize dishes
