= Chilocco Indian Agricultural School =

- U.S. National Register of Historic Places
- U.S. Historic district
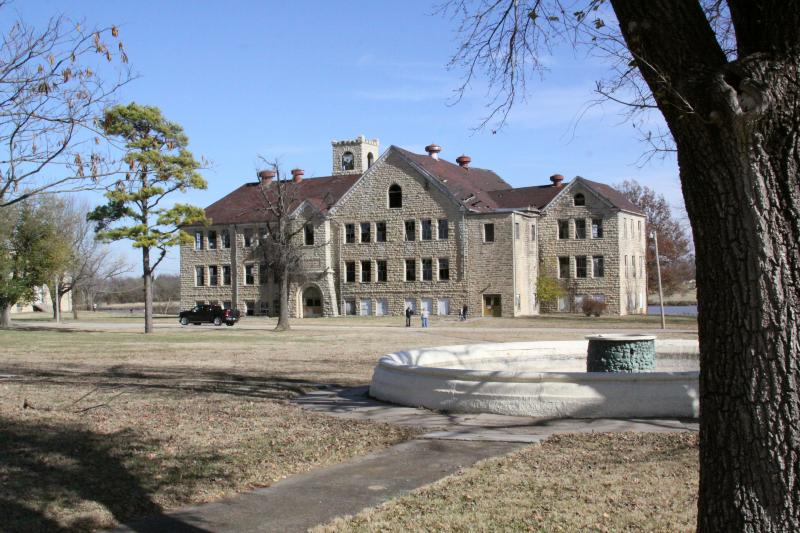
- One of the abandoned buildings at Chilocco Indian Agricultural School, a school for Native Americans that operated from 1884 to 1980 located approximately 20 miles north of Ponca City, Oklahoma.

- Location within Oklahoma Location within the United States
- Location: US 77 and E0018 Rd., Newkirk, Oklahoma
- Coordinates: 36°59′6″N 97°3′45″W
- Area: 288 acres (117 ha)
- Architect: Bidwell, Edmund; Pauley, Hoyland & Smith
- Architectural style: Romanesque, Colonial Revival, et al.
- NRHP reference No.: 06000792
- Added to NRHP: September 08, 2006

Chilocco Indian School (/ʃɪˈlɑkoʊ/) was an agricultural school for Native Americans on reserved land in north-central Oklahoma from 1884 to 1980. It was approximately 20 miles north of Ponca City, Oklahoma and seven miles north of Newkirk, Oklahoma, near the Kansas border. The name "Chilocco" is apparently derived from the Creek eco rakko, which literally meant "big deer" but typically referred to a horse.

In 1912, the Oklahoma Supreme Court heard a case over an election dispute involving whisky and whether the Chilocco reservation was part of Kay County and the state of Oklahoma or "Indian Territory". The U.S. Supreme Court ruled that school land was not an Indian Reservation, that the school was an off-reservation entity, and that the word reservation had various meanings and the area was not reserved as Indian territory.

== Background ==
The U.S. Congress in 1882 authorized the creation of five non-reservation boarding schools. Chilocco was one of the five which also included Carlisle Indian Industrial School in Pennsylvania, Haskell Indian Nations University in Kansas, Chemawa Indian School in Oregon, and Fort Simcoe in Washington. Major James M. Haworth, first Superintendent of Indian Schools, selected a site for the school along Chilocco Creek. The Indian Territory land was set aside for the school by an 1884 executive order signed by 21st President of the United States Chester Arthur. Chilocco was located in the Cherokee Outlet or Cherokee Strip and the Cherokee provided 8,640 acres (35 km^{2}) of land to help Chilocco fulfill its mandate for agricultural education.

== Objective and curriculum ==
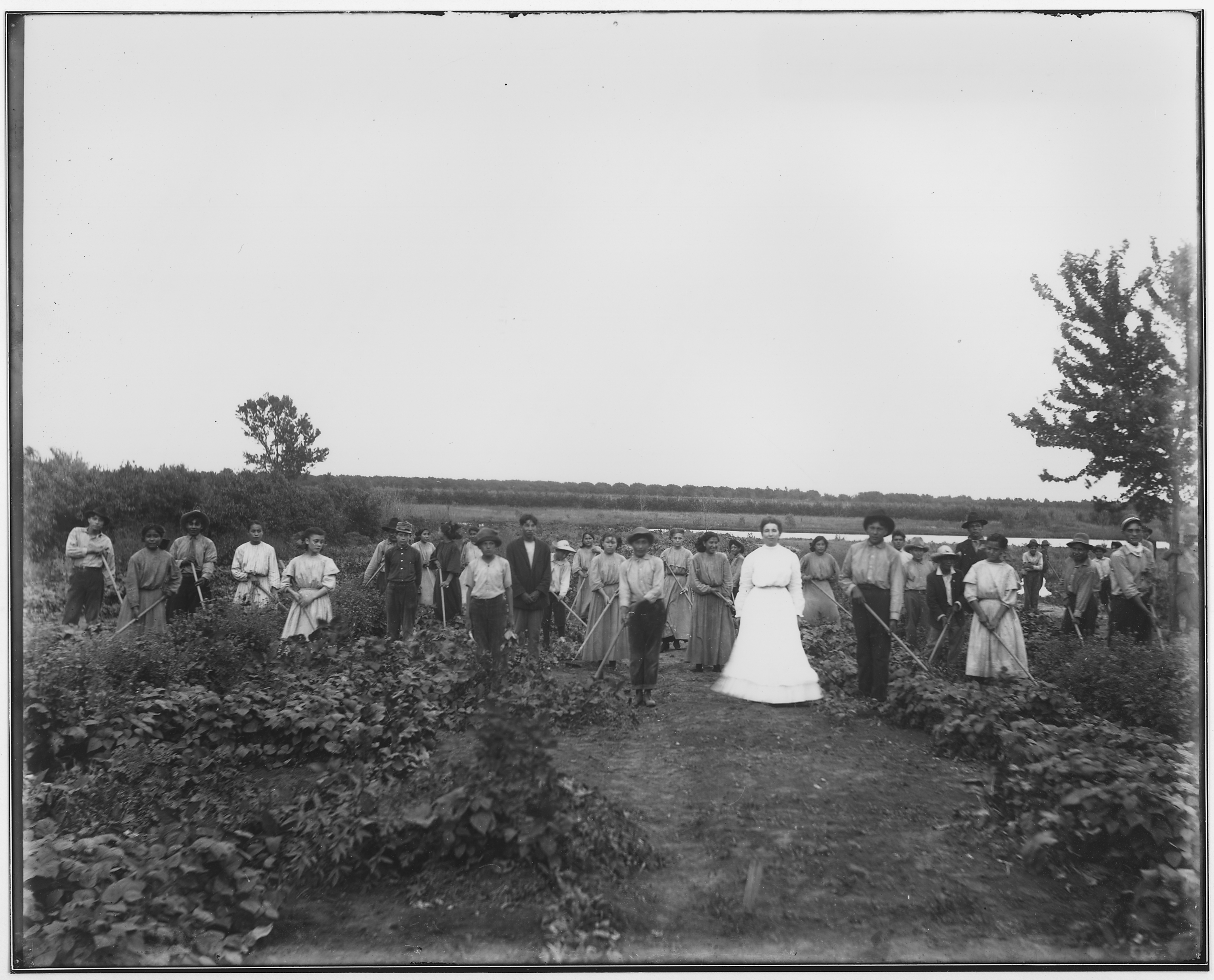
Students working in the garden at Chilocco Indian School (1909)

Chilocco provided academic and vocational education to American Indian students from all tribes in the United States. Its objective, like other American Indian residential schools, was to integrate and assimilate American Indians into the mainstream of American life. Until the 1930s, the school relied on a highly structured and strict military regime.

Students "remember twenty-two bugle calls a day, Government-issue uniforms, scanty meals, inadequate health care, and a paucity of individual attention." The school was "home and haven to some, reformatory and prison to others." Instruction focused mostly on vocational training rather than academic subjects and students were required to perform manual and domestic labor known as "actual work." Not only was education primarily vocational, it was often rudimentary in comparison to the education of white contemporaries. Native girls were being trained "not to labor in their homes but as employees of white women or the boarding schools that trained them. The Chilocco school aimed to teach Native girls subservience, and did not have a true stake in their education." Students were required to attend Christian religious services once a week."

A 1928 report critical of the Indian boarding schools led to reforms in the 1930s. "Boys and girls could sit together in the dining rooms, more attention was invested in academic work, and drudgery work devoted to school upkeep was cut back." The curriculum at the school focused on agricultural trades, including horseshoeing and blacksmithing, but also included building trades, printing, shoe repair, tailoring, leather work, and in later years plumbing, electrical work, welding, auto mechanics, food services and office education.

== History ==
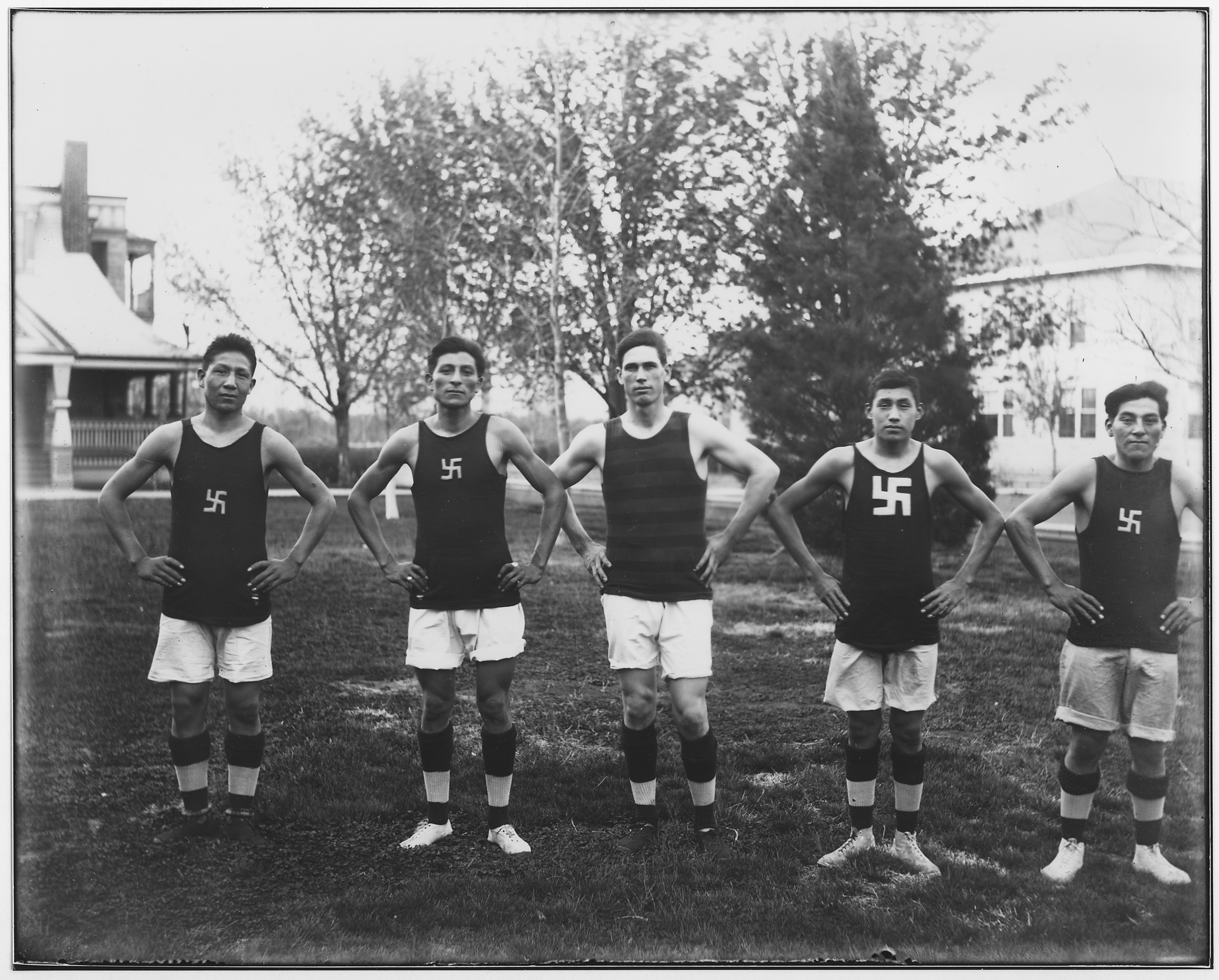
The 1909 Chilocco basketball team. Chilocco athletic teams often defeated University teams. The swastika was a common symbol used by American Indians until World War II.

The school opened in 1884 with 150 students from the Cheyenne, Arapaho, Wichita, Comanche, and Pawnee tribes. In 1894, the first graduating class consisted of 15 students. As the school expanded, additional structures were added in 1893, 1899, 1903, 1909, 1923, 1931 and 1932. In the 1960s, several of the older buildings were demolished to make room for a new dormitory and machine shop. The school's facilities at one time included more than 100 buildings, including a dining hall and hospital. Buildings were constructed from distinctive locally quarried yellow limestone. Students worked on the "rockpile" breaking large boulders into construction material.

Enrollment declined during the 1920s and the elementary school was closed, but with the onset of the Great Depression in 1929, enrollment increased because of growing poverty among Indians. As one graduate said, "It wasn't a matter of enjoying [Chilocco], it meant we were educated, clothed, fed, and had a roof over our head."

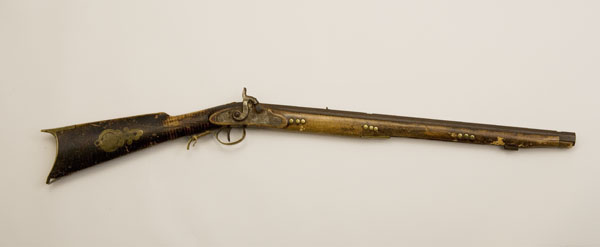
Chief Joseph gave his hunting rifle to Chilocco in 1885. It was returned to the Nez Percé when the school was closed in 1980.

In 1949, a special program for Navajo youth began. Enrollment at Chilocco peaked at about 1,300 in the 1950s. Thereafter, enrollment declined as many Indians had access to public schools and a boarding school was no longer essential to their education. In the 1970s, activists from American Indian organizations criticized abuses and, in 1972, the National Indian Youth Council staged a sit-in at the school. By the late 1970s only about 100 students still lived at the school.

== After closure ==
The Chilocco School closed on June 3, 1980 when the U.S. Congress ceased funding. In the school's 1980 yearbook, Superintendent C. C. Tillman wrote, "Chilocco is another in a long list of broken promises." During its history nearly 18,000 students from 126 Indian tribes attended Chilocco. Chilocco granted high school diplomas to 5,542 students. Graduates included 688 Cherokees, 573 Choctaw, 545 Navajo, and 452 Creek divided between 2,741 females and 2,801 males.

After closure, the school's land was granted to five local tribes as the Chilocco Development Authority; the Kaw Nation (.10 mineral interest), the Otoe-Missouria Tribe (.10 mineral interest), the Pawnee Nation (.10 mineral interest), the Ponca Nation (.10 mineral interest), and the Tonkawa Tribe (.10 mineral interest). The Cherokee Nation holds a .50 mineral interest. Between 1989 and 2001, the property was leased to Narconon, which operated a substance abuse rehabilitation center at the site.

In 2000, the Council of Confederate Chilocco Tribes was created by the Chilocco Treaty between the United States and the Kaw Nation, Otoe-Missouria Tribe, Pawnee Nation, Ponca Nation, and the Tonkawa Tribe. The treaty gave these nations joint authority to oversee and manage the former campus.

In 2006, Chilocco Indian Agricultural School was added to the National Register of Historic Places.

In 2011, Chilocco was closed to the public and used as a training and practice facility for federal law enforcement personnel.

In October 2016, the Cherokees announced that they were leasing to PNE Wind more than 4,000 acres of Chilocco land for a wind energy project. Other portions were to continue to be leased as ranchland.

In November 2017, the Department of Homeland Security published a statement in The Newkirk Herald warning local residents it was conducting tests at Chilocco Indian School. The statement advised "in January/February and again in June/July 2018, particles will be released onto buildings of the Chilocco campus. It is to determine how well biological agents will penetrate into single and multi-family homes." The department stated these chemicals are nontoxic and nonhazardous, but many in the community of Newkirk, Oklahoma expressed skepticism. The Department of Homeland Security report on the test confirms the chemicals used were nontoxic. Permission to use Chilocco as the site of their test was granted by the Council of Confederate Chiloco Tribes.

In 2021, after the discovery of hundreds of graves at Canadian residential schools the Chilocco Alumni Association called for ground penetrating radar equipment to survey outside of the cemetery for unmarked graves.

== Notable alumni ==
- Clara Archilta, watercolor painter and beadworker, Kiowa-Apache-Tonkawa
- Ernest Childers, Medal of Honor recipient, World War II, Creek
- Woody Crumbo, artist, Potawatomi
- William Henry "Lone Star" Dietz, football player and coach, Sioux
- Durbin Feeling, Cherokee linguist, Cherokee
- Charles George, Medal of Honor recipient, Korean War, Cherokee
- Marlene Riding In-Mameah, silversmith, Pawnee
- Jack C. Montgomery, Medal of Honor recipient, World War II, Cherokee
- Bertha Shipley, first Navajo graduate of Chilocco, 1915
- Wes Studi, actor, Cherokee
- Johnny Tiger Jr., artist
- Moses J. Yellow Horse, baseball pitcher, Pawnee
