= Fred Beaver =

American painter

- Born: Ekalanee; July 2, 1911; Eufaula, Oklahoma, US
- Died: August 18, 1980 (aged 69)
- Education: Self-taught, Bacone College
- Known for: Painting

Fred Beaver (2 July 1911 – 18 August 1980) was a prominent Muscogee Creek-Seminole painter and muralist from Oklahoma.

== Background ==
Fred Beaver was born in Eufaula, Oklahoma. His Muscogee name was Ekalanee, meaning "Brown Head." He was the son of Willie Beaver and Annie Johnson, was raised in Eufaula, and attended the Eufaula High School. He had become the All-State football and basketball star player. His grandfather was the sub-chief of the Okfuskee town in Alabama named Itshaus Micco, and had moved his town to where Eufaula is today.

Before Beaver had attended grade school, he was not able to speak any English and became a self-taught artist throughout the years of school. Graduating from high school in 1931, Beaver went straight into college at Bacone College. Beaver was an important part of the early Bacone College in Muskogee, Oklahoma. He had attended the Haskell Business College after graduating from Bacone in 1935.

At Bacone, Beaver did not train in art. He gave up his art career during the Great Depression and went on to serve in World War II. Once he returned to the United States, he decided to pick art back up under the guidance of Acee Blue Eagle, his wife's second cousin.

== Art career ==
Soon after looking for help and thinking about going back to school for art, he entered the Philbrook Museum of Art's annual art competition in Tulsa, Oklahoma and won an Honorable mention award. He helped define traditional Oklahoma Indian art with his style that he created; he started defining traditional painting of the Five Civilized Tribes. Beaver was one of the first artists to be designated as "Master Artists" of the Five Civilized Tribes Museum. His works are included in many museums and collections, including the Heard Museum (Phoenix, Arizona), the Sequoyah Research Center in Little Rock, Arkansas, and the Philbrook Museum of Art (Tulsa, OK).

Beaver has gone on to win many awards at the Philbrook's annual competitions and has worked for the Bureau of Indian Affairs for twenty-five years of his life. He was able to make a living off his artwork full-time and became more aware of the detail that was put into the paintings.

The Creek and Seminole artists were starting to question the work he was doing that represented the tribes' cultures. But his work is very accurate in the images, such as chickees and patchwork in clothing. He has been interviewed at the University of Florida for The Southeastern Indian Oral History Project, which was in collaboration with the Seminole Tribe of Florida.

Beaver designed three medallions for the Franklin Mint's celebration of the United States Bicentennial in 1976.

== Quote ==
I wanted to change the non-Indian's image of my people, and I wanted to help my own people understand themselves, especially the young.
