= Bacone College =

Private liberal arts college in Muskogee, Oklahoma, US

Coordinates: 35°46′37″N 95°20′05″W

- Former names: Indian University (1880–1910); Bacone Indian University (1910)
- Motto: A Place of Value & Opportunity
- Type: Private tribal college
- Active: 1880–2025
- Religious affiliation: American Baptist Churches USA (former)
- Location: Muskogee, Oklahoma, United States
- Campus: Suburban
- Colors: Red & White
- Nickname: Warriors
- Sporting affiliations: NAIA – Continental
- Website: www.bacone.edu
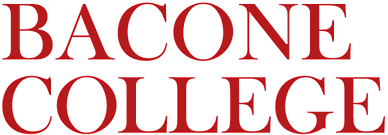

Bacone College, formerly Bacone Indian University, was a private college in Muskogee, Oklahoma. Founded in 1880 as the Indian University by missionary Almon C. Bacone, it was originally affiliated with the mission arm of what is now American Baptist Churches USA. Renamed as Bacone College in the early 20th century, it was the oldest continuously operated institution of higher education in Oklahoma at the time of its closure. The liberal arts college had strong historic ties to several tribal nations, including the Muscogee and Cherokee. The Bacone College Historic District has been on the National Register of Historic Places listings in Muskogee County, Oklahoma since 2014.

In 2018, the college was struggling financially. Several tribal nations agreed that year to a consortium and chartered it as a tribal college to secure federal funding under the government's treaty obligations to support Native American education. However, the Bureau of Indian Affairs did not approve conversion, leaving the college with financial issues. The college subsequently suspended operations for the spring semester of 2024 and filed for bankruptcy.

== History ==
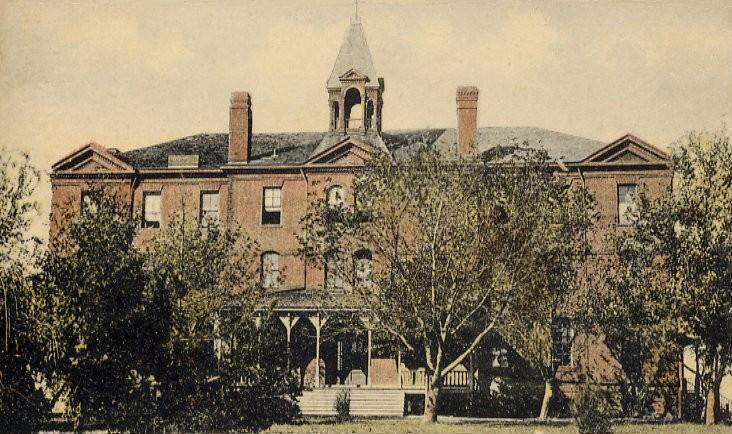
Rockefeller Hall, ca. 1910

Some accounts credit Almon C. Bacone, a missionary teacher in Cherokee Nation, Indian Territory, with asking the American Baptist Home Mission Society for support to start a school in the Cherokee Baptist Mission at their capital, Tahlequah in 1867. Bacone had previously taught at the Cherokee Male Seminary established in Indian Territory.

According to historian John Bartlett Meserve, Bacone College can be traced to a Baptist mission school at Valley Town in western North Carolina, which was part of Cherokee homelands. Evan Jones, one of the earliest missionaries to the Cherokee, led the school. After most of the Cherokee were removed to Indian Territory in the late 1830s, the Valley Town school moved to a site near what developed as present-day Westville, Oklahoma.

In 1867, Evan Jones' son, John B. Jones, moved the school to Tahlequah in the Cherokee Nation. In 1885, the mission school moved to Muskogee, Creek Nation, and changed its name to Bacone, after its first teacher.

When Bacone College was founded (at the time more of a seminary or academy in curriculum level) in 1867, Almon C Bacone was the sole faculty and three students were enrolled. By the end of the first semester, students had increased to 12. By the end of the first year, the student population was 56 and the faculty numbered three.

Bacone appealed to the Muscogee Creek Nation's Tribal Council to donate 160 acres (0.65 km^{2}) (a quarter section) of land for the college in nearby Muskogee. It was the capital of the Creek Nation, and informally known as the "Indian Capital of the World". The Nation granted the land to Bacone and the Baptists.

In 1885, Indian University was moved to a new building at its present site in Muskogee. It continued to develop here. In 1910, it was renamed Bacone College, after its founder and first president.

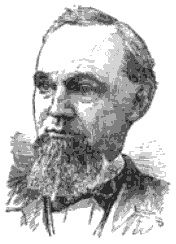
Almon C. Bacone

=== Conversion to tribal college ===
In the spring of 2018, the college struggled with severe financial difficulties. It began to lay off most employees following commencement and reported that it needed an immediate infusion of $2 million in order to continue to operate: to complete the 2018–2019 academic year and to open in the fall of 2019. The school reopened after cutting programs, reducing the number of faculty, and selling property. Among the properties sold was Bacone Commons, for $2.85 million as part of the college's 2018–2019 financial restructuring.

The tribal nations in Oklahoma collaborated to take over control of the college as a consortium to revive its history as a tribal college established for Indian education. The tribes hoped that they would be able to control education of their students, and that the arrangement would enable them to secure federal funding from the Bureau of Indian Education (in the BIA) as part of the government's treaty responsibilities to educate American Indian students.

The United Keetoowah Band of Cherokee Indians approved a charter agreement in April 2019. In July 2019, the Osage Nation announced that it would charter the school as a tribal college. In August 2019, the Otoe-Missouria Tribe of Indians also agreed to charter the college. The Cheyenne and Arapaho Tribes approved a charter in September, and the Kiowa Tribe in February 2020. (The Muscogee (Creek) Nation had previously chartered its own College of the Muscogee Nation.) However, Bacone did not officially become a tribal college because the BIA declined to approve the conversion, although it recategorized the college as an Indigenous-serving institution. This left each student to individually apply for a Pell Grant, tribal scholarship, or other financial aid.

=== Closure ===
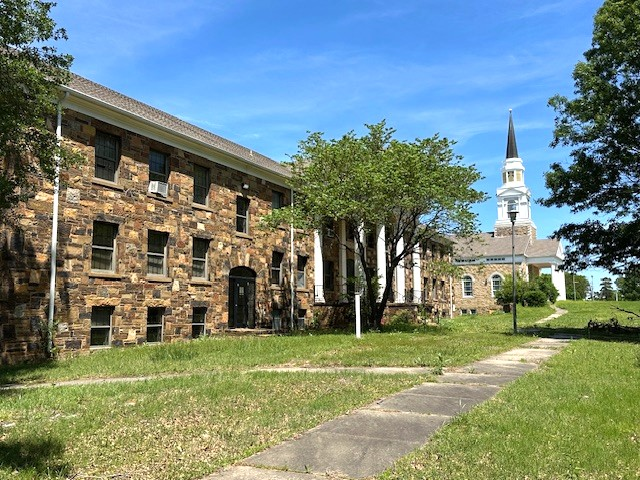
Bacone's McCoy Hall w-Memorial Chapel in background, May 2025

An HVAC firm called MHEC LLC (Midgley-Huber Energy Concepts) obtained a judgment of approximately $1 million against the school on November 13, 2022, for installation of materials and energy conservation services. College administrators said they were unable to pay due to debt accumulated under previous administrations so Muskogee County District Judge Timothy King authorized having the campus auctioned to satisfy the judgment in April of 2023. MHEC rescinded its request to auction the college at that point but, after declining an offer to be paid over time, pursued foreclosure again in November of 2023, getting an auction date set for December 14, 2023. One day before the auction, it was called off; however, the school had already laid off the bulk of its teachers in anticipation and was trying to get its students enrolled in other colleges for the next semester. Classes were also suspended for the spring 2024 semester. The administration hoped the shutdown was temporary but had to raise significant funds to avoid permanent closure.

Following a leadership change in April 2024, college leaders announced that nine students would be graduating on May 11 and that a "detailed revitalization plan" allowed the college to continue operating. Two months later, however, college leaders filed for bankruptcy and announced plans for the college to remain closed for the 2024-2025 academic year to reorganize. They hoped to merge with or be acquired by another institution. Regardless, the attempted Chapter 11 (reorganization) bankruptcy was converted by the court to a Chapter 7 (liquidation) bankruptcy, and all keys and control of the school was turned over to the bankruptcy trustee for that purpose on May 22, 2025. Certain personal properties of the school (vehicles, furniture and such, but not student records or sensitive documents) were auctioned in October of 2025.

== Campus ==
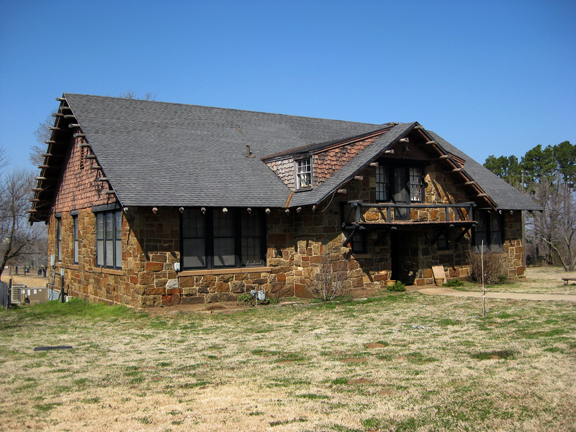
Ataloa Lodge, art museum on campus

One of the first buildings to be erected was Rockefeller Hall, a three-story building made possible by a $10,000 contribution from philanthropist John D. Rockefeller. "Old Rock," as it came to be called, served as classroom, dormitory, dining hall, chapel, teacher quarters and administration building. It was razed in 1938 and a Memorial Chapel was built in its place. That was destroyed by fire but was reconstructed in the 1990s. The historic buildings of the campus contribute to the Bacone College Historic District, which was listed on the National Register of Historic Places in 2014.

The campus contains many other reminders of Bacone's history, tradition, and goals. One of these is a small cemetery, the final resting place of Bacone presidents Almon C. Bacone (1880–1896) and Benjamin D. Weeks (1918–1941), as well as others associated with the school. A "stone bible" sculpture marks the spot on which President Bacone and Joseph Samuel Murrow and Daniel Rogers, two Baptist missionaries and trustees, knelt in prayer to dedicate the college. The names of all the college's presidents are inscribed on its surface.

Other structures on campus include The Indian Room at the Bacone College Library, which holds many of the papers of Almon C. Bacone; and, the McCombs Gallery, which features a large cross-section of Native American art. This includes artwork by Richard "Dick" West (Southern Cheyenne), an alumnus, former director of the art department and professor emeritus. This artist is best known for his traditional Plains-style artwork. The gallery also holds work by Woody Crumbo (Citizen Potawatomi), the only American Indian to receive a Julius Rosenwald Fellowship. Collectively, the modernist Flatstyle painting movement developed by Blue Eagle, Crumbo, West, and others is known as the Bacone school.

In 2011 Bacone College acquired the Northpointe Shopping Center, which it renamed the Bacone Commons. The college moved the campus library and important offices there. Bacone sold Northpointe in the Summer of 2018.

== Centers ==
Bacone College had three centers to help fulfill its historic mission of American Indian and Christian education.

- Center for American Indians:
  - Preservation of the American Indian Collections at Bacone College.
  - Coordination of American Indian degrees and cultural programs.
  - Research related to the future of American Indian education and collections in higher education.
- Center for Christian Ministry:
  - The broad umbrella for spiritual life on campus that helps the college to fulfill its mission as a four-year liberal arts college affiliated with the American Baptist Churches.
- Center for Church Relations:
  - As Baptist churches support the college with students and scholarships, this center develops leaders for evangelization. It also provides training to non-traditional learners through online and off-campus education, assisting churches in their growth, providing music and preaching/teaching ministry to churches for special events, and continuing education for church leaders.

== Indian Art Program ==
Initiated by Mary "Ataloa" Stone McLendon after her arrival at Bacone in 1927, the Bacone Indian Art Program became nationally known for its association with respected Native American artists such as W. "Dick" West, Acee Blue Eagle, and Woody Crumbo. It fostered that school of Native American art that came to be known as the "Bacone style". The college possesses the Ataloa Lodge Museum, built in 1932 and housing more than 20,000 pieces of traditional and contemporary Native American art, including the largest collection of Kachina dolls in the country. The fireplace of the lodge is constructed of stones sent to the college from various indigenous communities, and includes rocks from the grave of Sitting Bull, and from the field where Custer made his last stand. In January, 2022, the college officially opened the VanBuren Sunshine Gallery, being exhibition space in McCombs Hall used to display new student art.

== Athletics ==
The Bacone athletic teams were called the Warriors. The university was a member of the National Association of Intercollegiate Athletics (NAIA), primarily competing as an NAIA Independent within the Continental Athletic Conference since the 2019–20 academic year. The Warriors previously competed in the Sooner Athletic Conference (SAC) from 2015–16 to 2018–19; and in the Red River Athletic Conference (RRAC) from 1998–99 to 2014–15. The Bacone football team competed in the Central States Football League (CSFL) until the sport was discontinued after the 2018 fall season (2018–19 academic year).

Bacone competed in 11 intercollegiate varsity sports: Men's sports include baseball, basketball, cross country, golf and soccer; while women's sports include basketball, cross country, golf, soccer, softball and volleyball. Other sports prior to closure included football, wrestling, and rodeo.

=== Baseball ===
The Bacone baseball team won the Junior College World Series in 1967; a school with total enrollment of 250 competed with schools that had over 20,000. They were led by coach Enos Semore, who went on to coach at Oklahoma for 23 years.

=== Decline ===
Because of financial difficulties, in 2018 Bacone dropped its football, volleyball, golf, wrestling and rodeo teams. After several tribes agreed to charter the college in 2019 and ensure its survival, the college reopened.

=== Return ===
As of February 2020, the college has the following sponsored sports returned: men's and women's basketball, baseball and softball, men's and women's soccer, and men's and women's cross country teams.

== In popular culture ==
Bacone filled in for Carlisle Indian School as the backdrop for the Jim Thorpe biographical film Jim Thorpe – All-American.

== Notable people ==
=== Administration and staff ===
- Dean Chavers (Lumbee), president 1978–1981

=== Alumni ===
- Jimmy Anderson (Muscogee), artist, musician, and preacher
- Thomas Banyacya (Hopi), traditionalist and activist
- Don Chandler, class of 1954, professional football player
- Eddie Chuculate (Muscogee/Cherokee), author
- Adee Dodge (Navajo), linguist, painter, Navajo code-talker
- Martin Felix Napa ([Navajo]), Navajo code-talker
- Franklin Gritts (UKB Cherokee), artist and art director of the Sporting News
- Enoch Kelly Haney (Seminole/Muscogee), Class of 1962. Politician, artist, and sculptor
- Sharron Ahtone Harjo (Kiowa), artist and educator
- Timothy Hill, professional baseball pitcher
- Patrick J. Hurley, soldier, statesman, and diplomat
- Ruthe Blalock Jones (Delaware/Shawnee/Peoria) painter, printmaker and artist
- Edward E. McClish, (Choctaw) soldier and guerrilla leader in the Philippines during World War II
- Joseph Medicine Crow (High Bird) (Crow), tribal historian, author, and war chief
- Jack C. Montgomery (Cherokee), World War II Medal of Honor recipient
- Alexander Posey (Muscogee), writer and humorist
- Daniel Roberts, NAIA All-American wrestler; professional mixed martial artist
- Willard Stone, sculptor, attended Bacone, later received honorary degree
- Tyler Thomas, Canadian Football League player
- David E. Williams (Kiowa/Tonkawa/Kiowa Apache) artist

=== Faculty ===
- Acee Blue Eagle (Muscogee Creek), artist, Art Department director, 1935–1938
- Woody Crumbo (Citizen Potawatomi), artist, Art Department director, 1938–1941 and 1943–1945
- Ruthe Blalock Jones (Shawnee/Peoria), painter and printmaker, Art Department director
- Mary Stone McLendon (Chickasaw) educator, storyteller, and musician, founder of the Art Department and first director, 1932–1935
- Enos Semore, baseball, basketball, track, PE and intramural coach; head baseball coach Oklahoma 1968–1989
- W. Richard West Sr. (Southern Cheyenne), painter and sculptor, Art Department director, 1947–1970

== Gallery ==
Buildings from the Bacone Campus
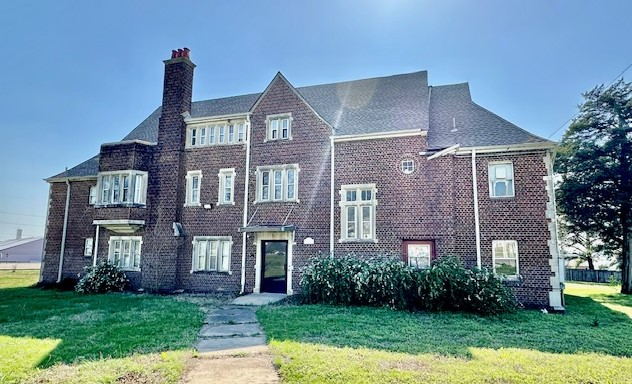
1923 Walter Starr brick residence hall, seen in April 2025

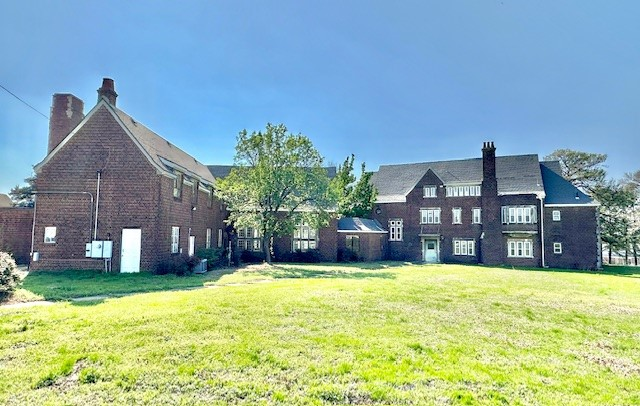
1922 Lucy Peters Hall (left) and 1923 Poloke-Bosen Hall in April 2025. Note the façade of Poloke-Bosen is the same as Walter Starr except in reverse order.

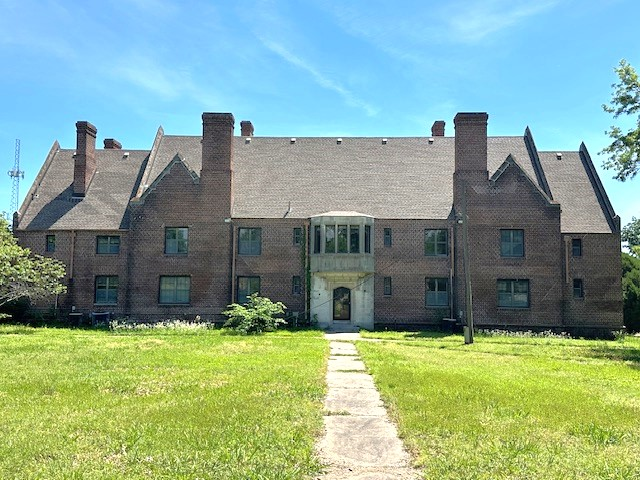
Jennetta Barnett Hall, May 2025

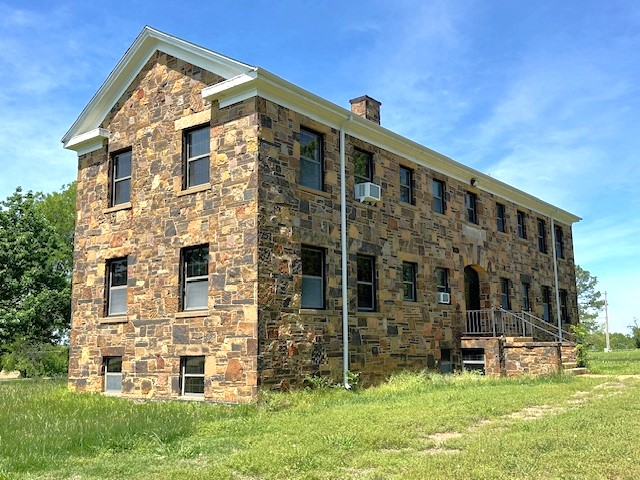
1937 William McCombs Hall in May 2025

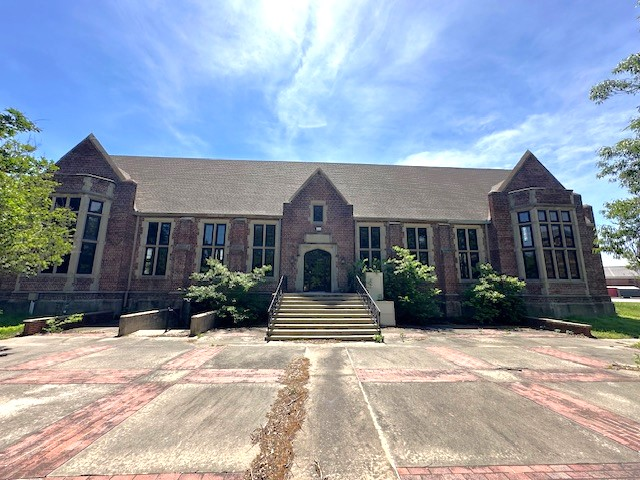
1924 Benjamin Wacoche Hall, in May 2025

== See also ==
- National Register of Historic Places listings in Muskogee County, Oklahoma
