= Jimmie Carole Fife Stewart =

Muscogee (Creek) art educator, fashion designer and artist

- Born: Jimmie Carole Fife; 1940 (age 85–86); Dustin, Oklahoma
- Other names: Jimmie Carol Fife-Stewart, Jimmie Carol Stewart, Jimmie Fife Stewart
- Citizenship: Muscogee Nation and U.S.
- Occupation: artist
- Years active: 1963–present

Jimmie Carole Fife Stewart (born 1940) is a Muscogee art educator, fashion designer, and artist. After graduating from the Chilocco Indian School and taking courses at the University of Arizona, she earned a degree from Oklahoma State University and began working as a teacher. After a six-year stint working for Fine Arts Diversified, she returned to teaching in 1979 in Washington, Oklahoma. Primarily known as a painter, using watercolor or acrylic media, Fife-Stewart has also been involved in fashion design. Her works have been shown mostly in the southwestern United States and have toured South America. Having won numerous awards for her artworks, she was designated as a Master Artist by the Five Civilized Tribes Museum in 1997.

== Early life ==
Jimmie Carole Fife was born on 1940 in Dustin, Oklahoma to Carmen (née Griffin) and James Fife. The oldest surviving child in her family of nine siblings. She was raised on her grandfather's allotment, bordering the Hughes County-Okfuskee County line. Fife came from a long line of artists and teachers. Her grandfather was a wood and stone carver, her father drew with colored pencils and chalks, and her mother, who was a teacher, created traditional crafts like medallions and quilts.

Each of her siblings was involved with art. These included Bill, one time principal chief of the Muscogee Creek Nation; a carver and draftsman; Sharon, Phyllis and Sandy who founded the Fife Collection, Inc. and produced contemporary fashion using techniques and motifs of the Southeastern Woodlands peoples; and sister Robin Elaine, who produced embroidery. Fife attended the Graham School in Weleetka, Oklahoma and then from 1954 to 1958 was a student at Chilocco Indian School. Between 1960 and 1961, she attended the University of Arizona, studying in the Southwest Indian Art Project and graduated in 1963 with a bachelor's degree in fine arts from Oklahoma State University in Stillwater, Oklahoma.

== Career ==
After her graduation, Fife began her career teaching in Dustin and started her graduate studies, eventually earning a master's degree in Education. Teaching for six years in Oklahoma and Texas, she moved to Oklahoma City, where from 1972 to 1978 she worked for Fine Arts Diversified. Fife married Robert N. Stewart and in 1979 the couple settled in Washington, Oklahoma, where she returned to teaching and continued with her art. The couple had two daughters, Kelley and Maya Stewart, who has collaborated with her mother and is a fashion accessories designer.

In 1968, when Fife won an award at the Annual Five Civilized Tribes Museum Art Show, the fact that a woman had won, inspired Virginia Stroud (Keetoowah Cherokee/Muscogee Creek) to team up with Mary Adair (Cherokee Nation), Jean Bales (Iowa), Joan Brown (Cherokee descent), Sharron Ahtone Harjo (Kiowa), Valjean McCarty Hessing (Choctaw), Ruthe Blalock Jones (Shawnee/Peoria), and Jane McCarty Mauldin (Choctaw) to support each other and their work. Stroud credited Fife with motivating the group's Daughters of the Earth exhibition, curated by Doris Littrell, which traveled for three years (1985–1988) and toured in the United States and Europe. While she was teaching, Fife-Stewart participated in various art shows including venues like the Scottsdale National Indian Art Exhibition, exhibitions of the U.S. Department of the Interior, and was one of the 28 artists selected by the International Communications Bureau to tour throughout South America. She and her sisters have also participated in the Santa Fe Indian Market.

Fife-Stewart's preferred media are acrylic paints, watercolors, or pen and ink drawings. Though most known for her Flatstyle paintings, since the 1970s, she has also collaborated with her sisters in the Fife Collection. Their work was featured in a month-long exhibit at the Southern Plains Indian Museum in Anadarko, Oklahoma in 1979 and she and Phyllis exhibited their fashion designs in 1981 at the Indian Paintbrush Gallery in Siloam Springs, Arkansas. She and Phyllis also were featured artists in a production of the Creek Nation Communication Department and KOED television, The Folklore of the Muscogee People released in 1983. In 2019, Fife-Stewart was one of the artists featured in the Five Civilized Tribes Museum's Women of the Five Civilized Tribes exhibition. Along with her sister Phyllis, the works of Fife-Stewart and Joan Hill (Muscogee Creek/Cherokee), Joan Brown (Cherokee descent), Yvonne Cannon (Chickasaw/Choctaw), Joan Stone Hansen, Joan Hill (Muscogee Creek/Cherokee), Barbara McAlister (Cherokee Nation), Victoria McKinney (Echota Cherokee), Kitty Millar (Choctaw), Traci Rabbit (Cherokee Nation), Jeanne Rorex-Bridges (Echota Cherokee), Virginia Stroud (Cherokee/Muscogee Creek), Dana Tiger (Muscogee Creek/Seminole/Cherokee) and MaryBeth Timothy (Cherokee Nation) were featured.

Fife-Stewart's 1968 work, New Barber is in the permanent collection of the Philbrook Museum of Art in Tulsa, Oklahoma. She has works in the permanent collections of the Five Civilized Tribes Museum in Muskogee, Oklahoma and her 1977 painting, The Earth is Our Mother, is part of the holdings of the Daybreak Star Cultural Center in Seattle. Among her many awards, Fife-Stewart won the Grand Prize at the 9th Annual Five Civilized Tribes Museum Art Show in 1975 and took First Place in the 11th Annual of 1977. In 1985, she was inducted into the Chilocco Indian School's Hall of Fame. Fife-Stewart was designated as a "Master Artist" by the Five Civilized Tribes Museum in 1997. The designation is the highest honor bestowed by the museum and artists must be nominated and judged. Only 35 artists had earned the designation through 2008, which allows them to participate in the Masters Art Show held annually.
