= Valjean McCarty Hessing =

American painter (1934–2006)

- Hessing, 1985
- Born: Valjean McCarty; August 30, 1934; Tulsa, Oklahoma
- Died: October 7, 2006 (aged 72); Onarga, Illinois
- Citizenship: Choctaw Nation of Oklahoma, American
- Education: Mary Hardin–Baylor College; University of Tulsa
- Occupation: painter
- Years active: 1945–2006
- Relatives: Jane McCarty Mauldin (sister)

Valjean McCarty Hessing (August 30, 1934 – October 7, 2006) was a Choctaw painter, who worked in the Bacone flatstyle. Throughout her career, she won 9- awards for her work and was designated a Master Artist by the Five Civilized Tribes Museum in 1976. Her artworks are in collections of the Heard Museum of Phoenix, Arizona; the Philbrook Museum of Art in Tulsa, Oklahoma; the Southern Plains Indian Museum in Anadarko, Oklahoma; and the Wheelwright Museum of the American Indian of Santa Fe, New Mexico, among others.

== Early life ==
Valjean McCarty was born on August 30, 1934, in Tulsa, Oklahoma to Madelyn Helen (née Beck) and Vernon Clay McCarty. Her family were members of the Choctaw Nation and she was the oldest of four siblings, Carol "Jane", Patrick, and Judy Louise. Her father was a plumber and an honorary tribal leader. Because he often had to travel for work, given that in-door plumbing was still uncommon, Valjean was raised in Tulsa in the home of her maternal grandparents, Sada and Fred Beck, who were of Welch ancestry. Her paternal grandparents, were Etta Regina (née Davis), who was Choctaw and Carl McCarty.

In grade school, McCarty wanted to become an artist, but when her father asked a local well-known artist where she and Jane could study painting, he was told that women could not be painters. Undaunted, when she won a scholarship at age 11 to attend weekend educational programs at the Philbrook Art Center, she accepted and studied art history, dancing, painting and pottery. From 1945, she participated in art shows at Philbrook, winning numerous local, state and national prizes for her artwork. After graduating from Tulsa Central High School in 1952, she won three college scholarships and chose to attend Mary Hardin–Baylor College in Belton, Texas. While she was at Baylor, she met Robert C. Hessing, a veteran of the Korean War and mathematician. The couple married in 1954. That year, she returned to Tulsa to study at the University of Tulsa under the tutelage of Alexandre Hogue. Completing her studies in 1955, McCarty took several years off to raise her children, Robert Bart, Jane Ann, Lauri Lynn, and Bradly Lewis, though she continued her study of art and in 1962, taught herself the Bacone flatstyle of painting.

== Career ==
Hessing is most known for her narrative history paintings in gouache using earth tones on a white background in the two-dimensional perspective of Flatstyle, a Native painting movement widespread in the 20th century. To give the appearance of depth, fine lines were added, as shading was not permitted. Though the flat-style was typically associated with previous generations of Native painters and Hessing was often discouraged by men who believed women should not paint, Hessing felt that it was important to keep the tradition alive. To make the work accurate, Native artists were required to do research to accurately portray the story of a custom or historic event meticulously reproducing garments, motifs, and themes. She sought to capture the wide spectrum of complexions among people and typically painted scenes of Choctaw daily life or focused on historic images and legends of her people.

In 1962, Hessing returned to painting and began entering art exhibits like the Scottsdale National Indian Art Exhibition (1962) in Arizona, the U.S. Department of Interior Art exhibition (1964) in Washington, DC, the Tulsa Council of Indians Exhibition (1965), and the Second Annual Invitational Exhibition of American Indian Paintings (1965) in Washington, DC. In 1966 at the Philbrook Indian Annual, Hessing placed second, behind Joan Hill (Muscogee Creek/Cherokee, 1930–2020), the first woman designated as a "Master Artist" by the Five Civilized Tribes Museum. In 1971, Hessing won first prize for painting in the Scottsdale Exhibition's 10th Annual and the following year was the Choctaw Heritage Award winner at the Five Civilized Tribes Museum in Muskogee, Oklahoma. She often exhibited her works with her sister Jane, the Heard Museum of Phoenix produced an exhibition featuring the two women in 1972. The following year, the Philbrook selected Hessing's work for a solo exhibition. In 1973, when her husband was appointed as director of research and development at Amoco, the family relocated to Naperville, Illinois.

In 1976, Hessing earned the distinction of "Master Artist" from the Five Civilized Tribes Museum. (Note: Broder states Hessing's designation occurred in 1986; however, the date 1976 given by King seems more likely, given that when Wall wrote her article in 1981, Hessing was noted for having already earned the designation of "Master Artist".) The designation is the highest honor bestowed by the museum and through 2008 only 35 artists had earned the distinction. Among her contemporaries, who had earned the distinction at the time of her recognition were Troy Anderson (Cherokee of Northeastern Alabama), Bob Bell (Choctaw Nation), Enoch Kelly Haney (Seminole/Muscogee Creek), Joan Hill (Muscogee Creek/Cherokee), Saint Clair Homer II (Choctaw Nation), Bert Seabourn, Jason Stone, and Willard Stone. (Note: Upon the passage of the Indian Arts and Crafts Act of 1990, Seabourn, Willard Stone, and his son Jason, among others were forbidden to show their works as Indigenous artists. The legislation required that Native artists be members of a federally or state recognized tribe or be a tribally designated artisan.) In 1978, Hessing was honored by the Heard Museum with the Popovi Da Memorial and won the Pierce-Avery Memorial Award for her work Removal to Indian Territory. She won the Pierce-Avery Memorial Award a second time in 1980 and that year had a solo exhibit in Washington, DC, at Via Gambaro Gallery.

Hessing was one of the featured artists who exhibited in 1983 at the Mary B. Rogers Gallery of the Millicent Rogers Museum in Taos, New Mexico. The following year, her family returned to Tulsa, when her husband was appointed to head Amoco's Computing Research Division. In 1985, she participated along with her sister Jane and Mary Adair (Cherokee Nation), Jean Bales (Iowa), Joan Brown, Sharron Ahtone Harjo (Kiowa), Ruthe Blalock Jones (Shawnee/Peoria), and Virginia Stroud (Keetoowah Band Cherokee/Muscogee Creek) in the Daughters of the Earth exhibition which traveled for three years (1985–1988), touring in the United States and Europe. Throughout her career, she won 90 honors for her paintings, which included nine grand awards.

== Death and legacy ==
When Hessing's husband retired in the early 1990s, the couple moved to Onarga, Illinois. There she died on October 7, 2006.

The U.S. Department of the Interior has preserved her works in two collections — Amerindian Circle and Indian Arts and Crafts Board, both located in Washington, DC. She also has works in the permanent collections of the Heard Museum of Phoenix; the Philbrook Museum in Tulsa; the Southeast Missouri State University Museum at Cape Girardeau, Missouri; the Southern Plains Indian Museum in Anadarko, Oklahoma; and the Wheelwright Museum in Santa Fe, as well as in private collections. In 2008, the Institute of American Indian Arts hosted a retrospective of her works, Valjean McCarty Hessing Honored, and her painting The Black Hat was featured on the cover of The Santa Fe New Mexican's issue of February 1, 2008. In 2012, her work Some Died along the Way (1969) was one of the pieces exhibited from the James T. Bialac Native American Art Collection acquired by the Fred Jones Jr. Museum of Art in Norman, Oklahoma. In 2019, she was among the women artists featured in the Five Civilized Tribes Museum's Women of the Five Civilized Tribes Exhibit.
