= Jane McCarty Mauldin =

American painter (1936–1997)

- Mauldin, 1985
- Born: Carol Jane McCarty; January 19, 1936; Tulsa, Oklahoma
- Died: October 27, 1997 (aged 61); Tulsa, Oklahoma
- Other name: Carol Jane McCarty Mauldin
- Citizenship: American
- Occupation: artist
- Years active: 1953–1997

Jane McCarty Mauldin (January 19, 1936–27 October 1997) was a Choctaw artist, who simultaneously worked in commercial and fine art exhibiting from 1963 through 1997. Over the course of her career, she won more than 100 awards for her works and was designated as a "Master Artist" by the Five Civilized Tribes Museum in Muskogee, Oklahoma. She has works in the permanent collections of the Heard Museum, the Heritage Center of the Red Cloud Indian School and the collections of the Department of the Interior, as well as various private collections.

== Early life ==
Carol Jane McCarty, known as Jane, was born on January 19, 1936, in Tulsa, Oklahoma, to Madelyn Helen (née Beck) and Vernon Clay McCarty. Her family were members of the Choctaw Nation and she was the second of four siblings, Valjean, Patrick, and Judy Louise. Though her older sister lived with her maternal grandparents Sada and Fred Beck, who were of Welch ancestry, Jane traveled with her parents, while her father sought work as a plumber. She attended elementary schools in Oklahoma, Texas and California, before graduating from Tulsa Central High School in 1954.

== Career ==
In her last year of high school, McCarty began working as a commercial artist for Floyd Gates Studio in Tulsa and would work there for 24 years. In 1955, she married Corwin Bobby Mauldin with whom she would have four children, Mark Corwin, Lisa Carol, Jerald Clay and Steven Carl, over the next five years. In 1963, Mauldin began exhibiting her paintings, produced at night after her full work day, in art shows. Unlike her sister whose works were in the traditional Bacone flatstyle, Mauldin worked in various styles using a variety of media like acrylic, collage, ink, pencil, oil, and watercolor. Early works trend towards photorealism, while some of her later pieces reflect more modern free-flowing trends. She exhibited at the First Annual Invitational Exhibition of American Indian Paintings of the U.S. Department of the Interior hosted in Washington, D. C. between November 1964 and January 1965. Two of her pieces exhibited at the Philbrook Museum of Art's Annual in 1965 were purchased by the Department of the Interior.

In 1972, Mauldin and her sister Valjean were featured in an exhibit produced by the Heard Museum of Phoenix, Arizona. The sisters often exhibited work together. She won the watercolor category prize in 1976 at the Scottsdale National Indian Art Show and in 1978, she was honored with the Jerome Tiger Award of the Five Civilized Tribes Museum. She was one of the women invited to participate in the National Indian Women's Art Show hosted at the Via Gambaro Gallery of Washington, D. C. in 1980. The next year, she and her sister were participants in the Kennedy Arts Center′s exhibition Night of the First Americans in Washington D. C. The following year, the Indian Arts and Crafts Board hosted a solo exhibition, Painting by Jane McCarty Mauldin at the Southern Plains Indian Museum in Anadarko, Oklahoma.

In 1985, Mauldin participated along with her sister Valjean and Mary Adair (Cherokee), Jean Bales (Iowa), Joan Brown (Cherokee), Sharron Ahtone Harjo (Kiowa), Ruthe Blalock Jones (Delaware-Shawnee-Peoria), and Virginia Stroud (Keetoowah Band Cherokee-Muscogee Creek) in the Daughters of the Earth exhibit which traveled for three years (1985–1988), touring in the United States and Europe. She was one of the featured artists at the 1990 Native American Fair hosted in Oklahoma City and also exhibited at the Red Earth Festival, winning 2nd place in drawing. That year she also placed 2nd in painting in the Five Civilized Tribe Annual. In 1993, Mauldin, K. Henderson (Cherokee) and Jeanne Walker Rorex (Echota Cherokee) were selected for a three-woman exhibit for the Sand Springs Museum's Fall Art Show.

Mauldin won more than 100 awards in the course of her career from the Five Civilized Tribes Museum, the Heard Museum, the Philbrook Museum, the Heritage Center of the Red Cloud Indian School in Pine Ridge, South Dakota, and the Santa Fe Indian Market, among others. She was designated as a "Master Artist" by the Five Civilized Tribes Museum in Muskogee, Oklahoma, shortly before her death.

== Death and legacy ==
Mauldin died from ovarian cancer on October 27, 1997, in Tulsa and was buried at Ridgelawn Cemetery, in Collinsville, Oklahoma, on October 31. In 2000, her work was selected for the all-women American Indian Women Art and Soul exhibition held at the Red Earth Museum in Oklahoma City. She has works in the permanent collections of the Heard Museum, the Heritage Center of the Red Cloud Indian School and the collections of the Department of the Interior, as well as various private collections.
