= Mary Adair =

Cherokee Nation educator and painter

- Born: June 2, 1936 (age 89); Sequoyah County, Oklahoma
- Other names: Mary Adair, Mary Adair Horsechief, Mary HorseChief
- Citizenship: Cherokee Nation, American
- Occupations: educator, painter
- Years active: 1958–present
- Known for: Bacone school painting

Mary Adair (also known as Mary Adair Horsechief, born 1936) is a Cherokee Nation educator and painter based in Oklahoma.

After completing her education, she first taught school and then worked in youth programs. She served as the director of the Murrow Indian Children's Home on the Bacone College campus in Muskogee, Oklahoma, and directed for the Cherokee Nation Jobs Corp Center before becoming the art instructor at Sequoyah High School in Tahlequah, Oklahoma.

Adair began her career as a professional artist in 1967. She won numerous art prizes and exhibited mainly in the Southeastern and Western United States. Places she exhibited includes Cherokee Heritage Center of Park Hill, Oklahoma; the Heard Museum in Phoenix, Arizona; the Heritage Center at Red Cloud Indian School in Pine Ridge, South Dakota; the Museum of the Cherokee Indian at Cherokee, North Carolina; and the Philbrook Museum of Art in Tulsa, Oklahoma. She has pieces in the Five Civilized Tribes Museum in Muskogee, Oklahoma, as well as other public collections. Julie Pearson-Little Thunder interviewed Adair in 2011 as part of Oklahoma State University's Oklahoma Native Artists Oral History Project.

== Early life and education ==
Mary Adair was born on June 2, 1936, in Sequoyah County, Oklahoma to Velma and Corrigan Adair. Adair's family can be traced back to Gahoga, a Cherokee woman, (sometimes known as Nancy Lightfoot) who married John Adair, a Scotsman in South Carolina in the 18th century. Her great-great-grandfather Walter died before the Trail of Tears march. He and her great-grandfather and her grandfather, Oscar Adair, were judges for the Cherokee Nation. Her great-grandfather, John Thompson Adair, also served as the superintendent of the Cherokee Nation Female Seminary.

After graduating from Sallisaw High School, Adair went on to further her education at Bacone College in Muskogee, Oklahoma, and graduated with her B.A. from Northeastern Oklahoma State University in Tahlequah, Oklahoma in 1957. On May 26, 1958, in Tucson, Arizona, she married Sam Horsechief, a Pawnee artist. Together, they had four children, three who became artists, Sam HorseChief Jr., Mary HorseChief, and Daniel HorseChief.

== Career ==
In 1958, Horsechief began her teaching career in the Tucson Arizona Public School System, later, 1966, continuing her graduate studies at the University of Tulsa and completing her master's degree in education at Northeastern. The couple moved to Dallas, Texas in 1959, but returned to Oklahoma City, before settling in Muskogee, Oklahoma around 1965. There, she worked as a director of the Head Start Program before becoming the director of the Murrow Indian Children's Home. In the late 1970s, Horsechief worked for the Cherokee Nation, at the Jobs Corps Center for a decade. Returning to teaching, she served as the art instructor at Sequoyah High School in Tahlequah, Oklahoma.

== Art career ==
Horsechief began her professional art career in 1967 and used the professional name Mary Adair Horsechief until her children became active as artists when she began using Mary Adair. Her subject matter typically focuses on Native American people, as they go about their daily lives or participate in ceremonies and she often portrays children. She has exhibited at the 'Trail of Tears Art Show and Cherokee Homecoming in Park Hill, the Five Civilized Tribes Museum in Muskogee, the Heard Museum in Phoenix, Arizona, the Museum of the Cherokee Indian of Cherokee, North Carolina, the Philbrook Museum of Art in Tulsa, Oklahoma and the Red Cloud Indian Art Show in Pine Ridge, South Dakota, among others.

In 1972, Adair won a first-place award at the Five Civilized Tribes annual competitive art show and was featured with David E. Williams (Kiowa/Tonkawa/Plains Apache) in a two-person exhibition and lecture held at the Goddard Center in Ardmore, Oklahoma. That year, she was one of four artists including Doc Tate Nevaquaya (Comanche), Leonard Riddles (aka Black Moon, Comanche), and Johnson Scott (Seminole), who exhibited at the University of Oklahoma. She repeated the win at the Five Civilized Tribes art show in the following year with a first-place award.

In 1976, Adair, along with Sharron Ahtone Harjo (Kiowa), Ruthe Blalock Jones (Shawnee/Peoria/Delaware), Virginia Stroud (Keetoowah Cherokee/Muscogee), Carrie Wahnee (Comanche) and Mary Bresser Young (Choctaw), were featured in an all women's exhibition hosted at the Stovall Museum in Norman, Oklahoma. In 1977, she was awarded the Special Indian Heritage Award by the Five Civilized Tribes Museum. Adair again joined Stroud, Harjo, Jones, as well as Joan Brown (Cherokee descent), Jean Bales (Iowa), Valjean McCarty Hessing (Choctaw), and Jane McCarty Mauldin (Choctaw) in the Daughters of the Earth exhibition, curated by Doris Littrell, which toured from 1985 to 1988 throughout the United States and Europe. Many of these same women participated with Adair in the Mothers and Descendants exhibition hosted at the Center of the American Indian in Oklahoma City in 1987.

Adair was one of the artists interviewed in 2011 for the Oklahoma State University's Oklahoma Native Artists Oral History Project. In 2015, she worked on a collaborative project with her children Sam, Mary, and Daniel, for the expansion of the Wilma Mankiller Health Center in Stilwell, Oklahoma. The piece called The Origins of Strawberries, featured paintings and text combining panels to tell the traditional Cherokee story. Her works were included in the Women of the Five Civilized Tribes exhibition hosted by the museum in Muskogee in 2019. Besides having works in the permanent collections of the Five Civilized Tribes Museum, her works are located in other museums, libraries, and private collections.

Adair illustrated Selu: Seeking the Corn-Mother's Wisdom (1994) by Marilu Awiakta and Native American Gardening (1996) by Michael J. Caduto and Josphe Bruchac.
