= Doris Littrell =

American gallerist (1929–2020)

- Born: Doris Mason; April 28, 1929; Apache, Oklahoma, United States
- Died: August 8, 2020 (aged 91); Plainview, Texas
- Known for: Art dealer, gallery owner
- Awards: Governor's Arts Award, 2004

Doris Littrell (1929–2020) was a gallerist from central Oklahoma who promoted Native American art.

From 1955 to 2009, she developed and expanded the market for Oklahoma Native art through her gallery, travels, and raising the visibility of Oklahoma Indian painters both inside and outside of the state. Littrell exerted a major impact upon the careers of Mirac Creepingbear, Doc Tate Nevaquaya, Merlin Little Thunder, and Virginia Stroud, among others.

== Early life and career ==
Doris Littrell was born on April 28, 1929, on a farm near Apache, Oklahoma. Her parents were Clarence and Isa Mason. Her maternal grandmother, Rosa Cook (née Read) homesteaded a ranch on the former Kiowa-Comanche-Apache Indian reservation with William Cook. Littrell grew up around Southern Plains Indians culture. She attended powwows with her maternal uncle and admired the paintings he collected from his neighbor George Geoinety. At age 13, she left home and went to Apache to work for her aunt as a switchboard operator. She worked the night shift at the telephone company and attended school during the day. Her best friend was Comanche and she spent many weekends at her home, absorbing aspects of Comanche culture from her mother, one of the first Comanche nurses.

In 1947, Littrell was hired by Southwestern Bell in Oklahoma City and met her future husband, Bob McCabe. As a newlywed, she bought Southern Plains paintings from her maternal uncle who, in turn, had purchased them from his Indian neighbors. When financial stresses soon made it necessary for her supplement her income, she turned to the sale of artwork to make more money. She bought paintings primarily from Kiowa and Comanche artists in Apache, Anadarko and Carnegie, and resold their work to businesses and individuals.

Her breakthrough occurred in 1969 when she mounted a Native art show in the Sales and Rental Gallery at the Oklahoma Arts Center in Oklahoma City. The owner of the S&R Gallery, Imogene Mugg, took over the next year with the All-Oklahoma Indian Artists Invitational. Between 900 and 1,100 people attended, from 1973 through 1976 The show became the largest Native art show in central Oklahoma prior to the launch of the Red Earth Native American Cultural Festival.

Also in 1969, Doris divorced Bob McCabe and married jewelry dealer, Mel Littrell. Their marriage did not last and eventually was annulled. Before and after, she continued to work with McCabe, marketing Oklahoma Native paintings throughout central Oklahoma, and in New Jersey, Washington, D.C., Colorado, Arizona, and California.

== Mid-career ==
Littrell opened Oklahoma Indian Art Gallery in 1979 after her retirement from Southwestern Bell. By that time, she had expanded her repertoire well beyond Southern Plains paintings. The gallery featured works by Dennis Belindo, Joan Brown, Joan Hill, Barthell Little Chief, Lee Joshua, Gary Montgomery, Bill Rabbit, Bert Seabourn, Brenda Kennedy Grummer, and numerous others. She also handled sculpture by Sherman and Allie Chaddlesone, Charley Pratt, Bill Haney, and Ted Creepingbear. Some of the state's most prominent cultural brokers frequented her business, including David and Molly Shi Boren, Drew Edmonson, and Oklahoma Arts Council Director Betty Price. Littrell was largely responsible for the brief commercial success enjoyed by Mirac Creepingbear prior to his premature death. She also played a decisive role in the careers of Merlin Little Thunder and Robert Taylor.

In 1990, Congress passed the Indian Arts and Crafts Act which made it a felony for a non-tribal member or designated artisan to identify as a Native American artist. The act was intended to protect the economic interests of Native individual artists, cooperatives, organizations and tribes from individuals or companies at home and abroad who falsely claimed to sell Indian products. In Oklahoma, it had additional consequences, particularly for artists who claim descent from but who are not enrolled in the Five Tribes—Cherokee, Chickasaw, Choctaw, Muscogee Creek and Seminole—whose membership is based exclusively upon the Dawes Rolls. Artists who could not prove descent from those rolls, despite their ancestry claims, possessed no political status as Indians and hence could not represent their art as Indian made. Although Littrell only handled a few unenrolled artists, she closed her gallery briefly in the aftermath of the bill and eventually reopened, like other Oklahoma galleries, with a disclaimer.

In 2004, Littrell was honored with the Governor’s Arts Award. Her gallery closed in 2010, after a series of downsizings, and she retired to Plainview, Texas.

== Death ==
Littrell died on August 8, 2020, in Plainview, Texas.
