= Joan Brown (disambiguation) =

Joan Brown (1938–1990) was an American figurative painter.

Joan Brown may also refer to:

- Joan Brown (artist, born 1945), American artist, illustrator and educator
- Joan Brown (potter) (1926–2016), British potter
- Joan Myers Brown (born 1931), American dance instructor
- Joan Heller Brown, American pharmacologist
- Joan Mary Wayne Brown (1906–1998), English children's writer

== See also ==
- Joan Browne, mother of actor Alan Alda
