= Johnny Tiger Jr. =

Native American artist

- Born: Johnny Moore Tiger Jr. February 13, 1940; Tahlequah, Oklahoma, U.S.
- Died: August 5, 2015 (aged 75)
- Known for: painting, sculpture
- Movement: Bacone style
- Awards: Master Artist, Five Civilized Tribes Museum (1982)

Johnny Moore Tiger Jr. (Muscogee Creek-Seminole), (February 13, 1940 – August 5, 2015) was a Native American artist from Oklahoma.

== Background ==
Johnny Moore Tiger Jr. was born on February 13, 1940, in Tahlequah, Oklahoma. His parents were Lucinda Lou Lewis and the John M. Tiger. His younger brother, the late Jerome Tiger, was a celebrated artist. As a child, he traveled with his grandfather Rev. Coleman Lewis, a well known Baptist missionary within the Muscogee Creek Nation. While traveling, Coleman taught his grandson the history and cosmology of their people in the Mvskoke, their tribal language. He is uncle to Dana Tiger.

He attended Chilocco Indian School and graduated from Muskogee Central High School in 1958. After graduation, he served in the United States Air Force.

== Art career ==
As a young man Tiger loved pin striping hot rods but moved towards fine arts. His paintings illustrated the oral history of his tribes, and he painted scenes such as a tribal gathering, stomp dances, or medicine men healing the sick, based on his own experiences.

In 1959, he enrolled at Bacone College in Muskogee, Oklahoma, to study art under the legendary Southern Cheyenne painter Dick West. His classmates included David E. Williams and Joan Hill. After winning numerous major art awards by the late 1970s, he became a full-time artist. The Five Civilized Tribes Museum declared Johnny a Master Artist in 1982.

Tiger was also a well-known sculptor. He received many major awards and produced several bronze pieces.

== Death ==
Johnny Tiger Jr. died on August 5, 2015. Funeral services were held at the First Baptist Church in Eufaula, Oklahoma, and he was interred at the Greenwood Cemetery in Eufaula.

== See also ==
- Dana Tiger
