= Gary Montgomery =

Gary Montgomery may refer to:

- Gary Montgomery (sportsman)
- Gary Montgomery (artist)
