= Tear dress =

Traditional Cherokee dress style

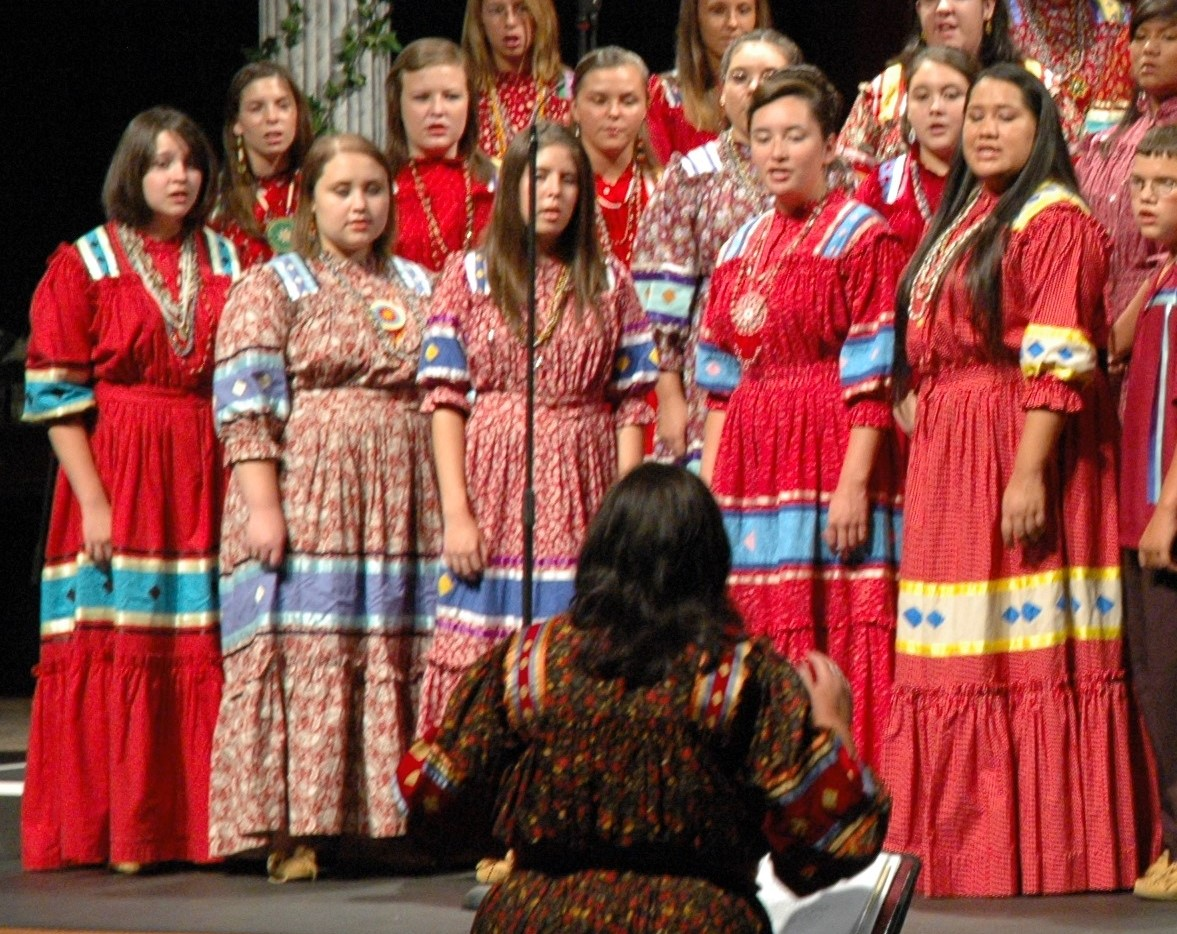
Cherokee girls dressed in tear dresses for choir concert

A tear dress (Cherokee: ᎦᏣᎦᎸᏓ ᎠᏌᏃ (ᏅᏓᏣᎦᎸᏓ), romanized: gatsagalvda asano (udatsagalvda)) is a long dress made of calico worn by Oklahoma Cherokee women. The tear dress is the official dress of the Cherokee Nation. Based on a historical dress carried to Indian Territory over the Trail of Tears, the tear dress was first designed in 1969 by Wendell Cochran (Cherokee Nation) and sewn by Elizabeth Higgins (Cherokee Nation) for Virginia Stroud (Keetoowah Cherokee/Muscogee) when she successfully ran for Miss Indian America.
