= Bill Rabbit =

American painter (1946–2012)

- Born: William E. Rabbit; December 3, 1946; Casper, Wyoming, US
- Died: April 9, 2012 (aged 65); Tulsa, Oklahoma, US
- Known for: Painting
- Awards: Master Artist by the Five civilized Tribes Museum (1986)
- Website: https://billandtracirabbit.com/

William E. Rabbit (December 3, 1946 – April 9, 2012) was an American artist who experimented with various styles, painting as he felt rather than according to public expectations. Rabbit exhibited his art in numerous locations and won many awards over the period of his artistic career. In 1986, he was designated Master Artist by the Five Civilized Tribes Museum. Toward the end of his life, Rabbit began collaborating on paintings with his daughter Traci, in their mutual studio located in Pryor Creek, Oklahoma. He died on April 9, 2012.

== Early life ==
Bill Rabbit was born in Casper, Wyoming on December 3, 1946, to parents Swimmer Dave Rabbit and Doris M.E.H Rabbit. He attended school in Casper, where he was the only Cherokee student in the school system. His talent showed early on in his kindergarten class. Rabbit sold his first watercolor in the fourth grade for $4, exhibiting his business savvy. Rabbit has no formal training in art apart from a two-week class in grade school. After high school, Rabbit was accepted to the Institute of American Indian Art in Santa Fe, New Mexico but enlisted in the army instead to serve in Vietnam. Following the war, Rabbit moved to his father's homestead allotment in Mazie, Oklahoma. In Maize, he made Southwestern jewelry with his welding skills. Later, Rabbit took up painting full time and he and his wife began to travel to booth shows and galleries across the country.

== Style ==
Rabbit began painting as he felt rather than in a more traditional style according to what the public wanted. He was part of a wave of artists that broke from the older generation of native artists. Over time, Rabbit's subject matter has evolved from the realistic to the ethereal.

== Exhibitions and awards ==
Rabbit's work is widely known and was exhibited in numerous locations, including:

- Albuquerque Museum
- Cherokee National Museum
- Five Civilized Tribes Museum
- Red Cloud Indian School Heritage Center Inc. Collection
- Indian Arts & Crafts Association
- Inter-Tribal Indian Ceremonials
- John F. Kennedy Center for the performing Arts' Night of the First Americans
- Paul VI Institute for the Arts' Let the Spirit Speak!
- Museum of Natural History
- Native American Center for the Living Arts
- Oklahoma Art Center Gallery's All-Oklahoma Indian Artists Invitational
- Oklahoma Indian Art Program
- Oklahoma State Capitol
- Prairie Fire Invitational Art show
- Red Cloud Indian School - The Heritage Center's Red Cloud Indian Art show
- Red Earth Festival
- Southwestern International Round-up Tri-culture Art show
- Trail of Tears State Park Gallery
- University of West Virginia

Bill's work is also featured in numerous public and private galleries. Some of his greatest achievements include:

- Named poster artist for the Inter-Tribal Indian Ceremonials (1984)
- Designated a Master Artist by the Five civilized Tribes Museum (1986)
- Poster artist for the Totah Festival (1988)
- Artist of the Year & poster artist for the American Indian & Cowboy Artists National Western Art Exhibit (1989)
- Named a Cherokee National Treasure

The Bill Rabbit Legacy Art Scholarship was created in Rabbit's honor by the Cherokee Nation Foundation.
