= Joan Brown (artist, born 1945) =

American artist

- Born: 1945 (age 80–81); Yahola, Oklahoma, United States
- Education: Bacone College, Northeastern State University
- Known for: Watercolor, gouache
- Movement: Bacone school
- Children: 6

Joan Brown (born 1945) is an American artist, illustrator and educator. She is of Cherokee and Creek descent from Oklahoma. Her work is of the Bacone school style.

== Early life and education ==
Brown was born and raised in the small town of Yahola, in Northeastern Oklahoma. Her father was Native American and was a drafter and worked at Douglas Aircraft Company in Tulsa. Brown learned to love art from a young age. After her father’s death, Brown learned some elements of the Cherokee and Creek languages, but never became fluent as she wanted to fit in.

At a craft show in the 1970s, Brown was discovered by artist Terry Saul who was an art teacher at Bacone College. Saul encouraged Brown to get her college degree and helped her get a scholarship. Saul continued to mentor Brown and encouraged her to develop and stick to her own style.

Brown continued her studies and attended Northeastern Oklahoma University in the 1970s, where she studied psychology.

== Art work ==
While raising her six children, Brown struggled to find the time to work on her art and often had to stay up late to get her work done. She started selling her work in galleries in 1978.

Brown’s work heavily focuses on traditional Native women and domestic home life. Brown works in many mediums including watercolor and gouache. She is known as the, "Norman Rockwell of Native art" and in 1986 was given the title of Master Artist by the Five Civilized Tribes. She has had various exhibitions including at the Five Civilized Tribes Museum (1972, 1991, 2019), the Fred Jones Jr. Museum of Art (2009), the Cherokee National Museum (1989), among others.

In 1988, her hometown of Muskogee held a “Joan Brown Day.” Brown illustrated the cover of the cookbook, "Pow Wow Chow: A Collection of Recipes from Families of the Five Civilized Tribes: Cherokee, Chickasaw. Choctaw, Creek and Seminole" (1984).

== Community work and activism ==
She has taught her children about their Native heritage and the importance of their past. Brown has expressed concerns about the lack of new artists entering the field of Native art. Brown has stated that one of her greatest achievements is her work in helping to care for older people and children in the native community. Another artist, Mary Adair (HorseChief), asked Brown to come and work at the Murrow Indian Children’s Home, where Adair was Director.

While working at a children’s home she taught art classes to the children during the summers. The lack of indigenous social workers in native communities inspired Brown to spend her working life serving the needs of the community. Additionally, Brown began a five-year project to sell some of her artwork to help raise money for an assisted living home.
