= Kay WalkingStick =

Native American landscape artist

- Born: March 2, 1935 (age 91); Syracuse, New York, U.S.
- Education: Beaver College (BFA); Pratt Institute (MFA)
- Known for: Painting, mixed media, drawing
- Awards: National Endowment of the Arts; Joan Mitchell Foundation award; Women's Caucus for Art National Honor award for Achievement in the Arts Distinguished Artist Award from the Eiteljorg Museum of American Indians and Western Art; Lee Krasner award for lifetime achievement of the Pollock-Krasner Foundation; Anonymous Was A Woman Award grantee
- Website: kaywalkingstick.com

Kay WalkingStick (born March 2, 1935) is a Native American landscape artist and a member of the Cherokee Nation. Her later landscape paintings, executed in oil paint on wood panels, often include patterns based on Southwest American Indian rugs, pottery, and other artworks.

WalkingStick's works are in the collections of many universities and museums, like the Metropolitan Museum of Art, the Israel Museum, the National Museum of Canada, and the Smithsonian National Museum of the American Indian. She is an author and was a professor in the art department at Cornell University, where she taught painting and drawing. She has been accepted into many artist residency programs which gave her time away from teaching duties to paint. WalkingStick won many awards and in 1995 was included in H.W. Janson's History of Art, a standard textbook used by university art departments.

WalkingStick is an Honorary Vice President of the National Association of Women Artists, Inc.

== Personal life ==
Kay WalkingStick was born in Syracuse, New York, on March 2, 1935, the daughter of Simon Ralph Walkingstick and Emma McKaig Walkingstick. Emma was of Scottish-Irish heritage, and Kay's father, Ralph, was a member of the Cherokee Nation, who wrote and spoke the Cherokee language. Ralph was born in the Cherokee Nation capital of Tahlequah, Oklahoma, and attended Dartmouth College. Kay's parents had four other children, and as they raised their family Ralph Walkingstick worked in the oil fields as a geologist. He became an alcoholic. While pregnant with Kay, her mother left Oklahoma with their other children and moved to Syracuse, New York. WalkingStick grew up in Syracuse without having experienced the cultural heritage of her Cherokee ancestors. Her siblings, who spent some of their childhood in Oklahoma, had a better understanding of their father's Cherokee traditions. Her mother told her "Indian stories" and talked about her handsome father. The family was proud to be Native Americans. Kay liked to color and draw from a young age.

WalkingStick married R. Michael Echols in 1959, and they had two children, Michael David Echols and Erica WalkingStick Echols Lowry. Michael Echols died in 1989. She married artist Dirk Bach. (Note: Dirk Bach received his bachelor's degree and master's degree in painting at the University of Denver and his master's at the University of Michigan in Far Eastern art history. He taught Contemporary art and Asian art at the Rhode Island School of Design until 1992. His works are exhibited in museums and galleries, including the Harbor Square Gallery in Rockland, Maine and the Nicole Fiacco Gallery in Hudson, New York.) They married in November 2013 and have lived in Easton, Pennsylvania.

== Education ==
WalkingStick received her Bachelor of Fine Arts degree in 1959 from Beaver College, Glenside, Pennsylvania. (Note: She received a scholarship to attend Beaver College, which she credits for giving her the education to "feel like the artist I knew I was" and led her to become an educator.) Ten years later she received the Danforth Foundation Graduate Fellowship for Women, and attended Pratt Institute in Brooklyn, New York. She received her Master of Fine Arts in 1975.

WalkingStick was at the MacDowell Colony in New Hampshire for a month-long residency in both 1970 and 1971. In July 1976 she was an artist-in-residence in Saratoga Springs, New York, at the Yaddo Artists' Colony, and at Montauk, New York, in August 1983 at the William Flanagan Memorial Creative Persons Center. In 1992 she painted at the Conference and Study Center in Bellagio, Italy. In 1995 she was a visiting teacher and artist at the Vermont Studio Center for a month. In 2011, she was awarded an honorary Doctor of Humane Letters degree by Arcadia University.

== Career ==
=== Artist ===
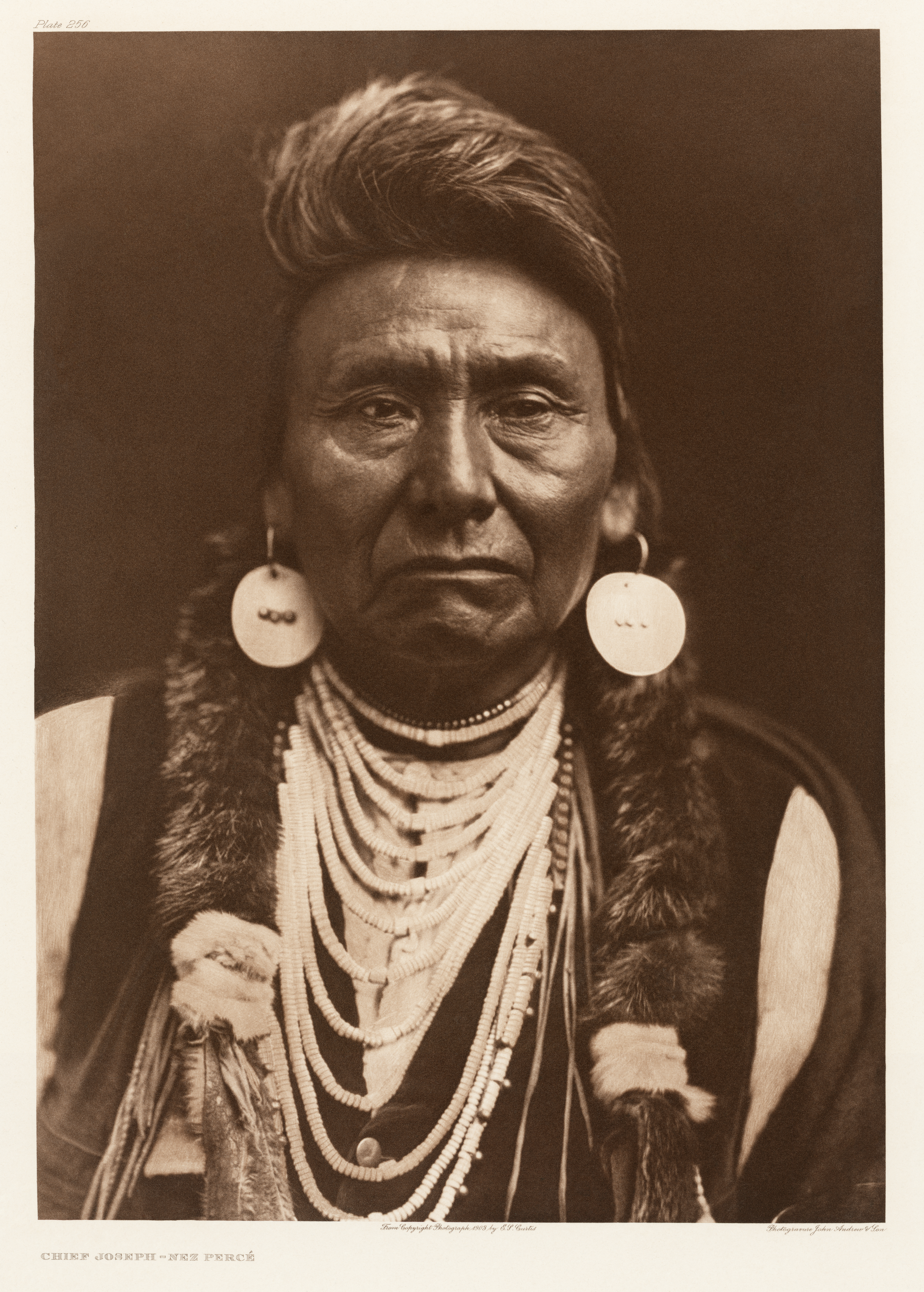
Chief Joseph of the Nez Perce was the subject of her "Chief Joseph" series.

She created representational art works after college which for the next 10 years were self-described as "hard-edged" and "realistic". In graduate school during the early 1970s, her work became more abstract and were included in many New York City exhibitions, at a time when Native American artists' works were seldom exhibited. In graduate school she began to study Native American art and history, seeking to understand her "Indianness". WalkingStick began a series of works about the 19th-century Nez Perce "Chief Joseph" who resisted reservation life. She layered wax and acrylic paint, mixed together onto inked canvas and left the design unpainted then cut to create designs. In 1978 she had a solo exhibition at Bertha Urdang Gallery. WalkingStick later integrated other elements into the works, like small rocks, pieces of pottery, metal shavings, and copper. Throughout the process she added paint with her hands or a knife in the areas exposed from the cut wax to create her final work.

My wish has been to express our Native and non-native shared identity. I want all people to hold on to their cultures — but I also want to encourage a mutual recognition of a shared being.

— Kay WalkingStick

In another personal search, Walkingstick created Messages to Papa in 1974 to better understand the conflicted feelings that she had for her father. The work was a stereotypical image of a Native American dwelling, the tipi, although it was not a Cherokee structure. She used the image, as a symbol of Native Americans to people of non-native descent. In the middle of the work she hung a Cherokee language translation of the Lord's Prayer and a letter to her deceased father.

Messages To Papa 1974 detail by Kay WalkingStick

Kay WalkingStick, Wallowa Mountains Memory, Variations, oil and gold leaf on wood, 35 3/4 x 71 1/2 in, 2004, Metropolitan Museum of Art WalkingStick has become best known for her use of diptychs, two-paneled works of art. She said, "[T]he diptych is an especially powerful metaphor to express the beauty and power of uniting the disparate and this makes it particularly attractive to those of us who are biracial.

She began making abstract/landscape diptychs in 1985, for which she gained success nationally and internationally. Generally, she made an abstract work on one panel of the diptych and a representational, or realistic, image on the other. She has made landscapes of the Rockies and the Alps and of the ancient southwestern sites, Mesa Verde and Canyon De Chelly from sketches she had made during her visits there. Walkingstick said, "I do not see my paintings as landscapes, per se, but rather as paintings that describe two kinds of perception of the earth. One view is visual and fleeting and the other is abstract and everlasting. These paintings are my attempt to express the mythically inexpressible and to unify the present with eternity."

After her husband died unexpectedly in 1989, she introduced waterfalls to her works, like the painting Abyss, an abstract painting with blood-red water and white foams. She said that the waterfall paintings are "a metaphor for the onrush of time and the unstoppable, ultimate destiny of our lives."

The landscape that she made in 1991, Where Are the Generations? reflects the rugged mountains and desert of the Southwest, at night. The emptiness speaks of the toll that European colonists had on the indigenous population. The words in copper repoussé affixed to the abstract side are: "In 1492 we were 20 million. Now we are 2 million. Where are the children? Where are the generations? Never born" followed by her name in the Cherokee syllabary

In 1995, she was included in art history textbook, H. W. Janson's History of Art, which is a standard of universities and colleges. The diptych Gioioso Variation I (2001) of the Italian Alps, inspired by the many trips WalkingStick made to Italy between 1996 and 2003, "contains sensuous, mountain crevasses that fold and ripple to create a lush visual space; on the right side is a dancing couple, brown against a lighter brown ground, both sides under a shiny, gold sky. The physicality and sensuousness of this image is both poetic and erotic."

In 2004, she painted, Wallowa Mountains Memory, Variations, a painting of the Wallowa Mountains, the homeland of the Nez Perce people before they were removed to reservations. A gold leaf sky is used on both side of the diptych painting. On the right side are purple mountains with a Nez Perce corn husk bag design. On the left are gray and white mountains. The painting is now in the Metropolitan Museum in New York City. Later paintings are of American landscape with basket, weaving, pottery or parflêche patterns of the Native American people who live or lived in that same landscape.

=== Educator ===
In 1988, WalkingStick was hired by Cornell University in Ithaca, New York, to be an assistant professor of art. She taught there until 1990 when she was employed by the State University of New York, Stony Brook, a position she held for two years. She returned to Cornell University in 1992, where she taught drawing and painting as a full professor, retiring in 2005. She then moved to New York City to work full-time in her studio. She has retired as professor emerita of Cornell University.

== Awards ==
She is the recipient of the following:

- 1983: National Endowment of the Arts grant
- 1991: Richard A. Florsheim Art Fund Award, Tampa, Florida, used to purchase diptych "Letting Go From Chaos to Calm" for the Rockwell Museum of Western Art
- 1995: Joan Mitchell Foundation award
- 1996: National Honor award for Achievement in the Arts, Women's Caucus for Art
- 2003: Distinguished Artist Award from the Eiteljorg Museum of American Indians and Western Art, the first woman to win this award
- 2011: Lee Krasner award for lifetime achievement, the Pollock-Krasner Foundation
- 2026: Anonymous Was A Woman grantee

== Works ==
=== Art ===
==== Works of art ====
- Message to Papa, 1974
- Chief Joseph series
- Paper Piece #1, ink, acrylic, and tape; 16" x 20", 1975
- Abyss, 1989
- Where are the Generations?, acrylic, oil, wax and copper; 28" x 50", 1991
- Gioioso Variation I, diptych, 2001
- Wallowa Mountains Memory, Variations, painting on wood, 2004
- Night Magic, 2001.
- Winter Flight, 1998–1999.

==== Exhibitions ====
According to author Deborah Everett, "WalkingStick became solidly established in the mainstream art world during the 1980s and 1990s." For instance, her works went on a touring exhibition in 1994 after she exhibited at the Cairo Biennial. Her works have been shown in many European and American exhibitions, including both solo and group exhibitions, a few of which are National Museum of the American Indian, National Gallery of Canada and Heard Museum. She was represented by New York's June Kelly Gallery, which has held exhibitions of her work.

In 2008, her "American Abstraction: Dialogue with the Cosmos" that honored Native American women was exhibited at the Montclair Art Museum. It contained parfleche bags with images of landscape designs, like the Wallowa Mountains, and abstract designs of the Nez Perce and other indigenous tribes. The bags were used to store and carry food and other items.

WalkingStick's works were shown in the 2015–2016 exhibition "Kay WalkingStick: An American Artist," at the National Museum of the American Indian in Washington, D.C. and the Heard Museum in Phoenix. The show is the first to trace her four-decade-long career and includes many works that reflect "own hybrid cultural identity, engaging Native history along with feminism, Minimalism, and other key art historical movements. She has become particularly renowned for her majestic and sensual landscapes, which imbue natural scenery with the charge of personal and collective memory."

The Dayton Art Institute in Dayton, Ohio, began its 2017 special exhibition season with "Kay WalkingStick: An American Artist". The exhibit ran February 2017 through May 2017. "Kay WalkingStick: An American Artist" was also shown in 2018 at the Montclair Art Museum.

In 2020, the art of WalkingStick was exhibited in the exhibition Hearts of Our People: Native Women Artists at the Smithsonian American Art Museum.

In 2023, the exhibition Kay WalkingStick/Hudson River School opened at the New-York Historical Society. At this time, this was the artist's largest museum exhibition in New York City.

Her work was included in the 2024 exhibition Making Their Mark: Works from the Shah Garg Collection at the Berkeley Art Museum and Pacific Film Archive (BAMPFA).

==== Collections ====
WalkingStick's works are in the collections of:

- Albright-Knox Art Gallery, an art museum in Buffalo, New York
- Bailey-Howe Library, University of Vermont
- Eli and Edythe Broad Art Museum (formerly the Kresge Museum of Art), East Lansing, Michigan
- Cherokee Heritage Center, Park Hill, Oklahoma
- Cherokee Nation Foundation, Tahlequah, Cherokee Nation
- Dartmouth College, Hanover, New Hampshire
- Davidson College, North Carolina
- Denver Art Museum, Colorado
- Detroit Institute of Arts, Michigan
- Eiteljorg Museum of American Indians and Western Art, Indianapolis
- Gilcrease Museum, Tulsa, Oklahoma
- Heard Museum, Phoenix
- Herbert F. Johnson Museum of Art, Cornell, Ithaca
- Israel Museum, Jerusalem
- La Jolla Museum of Contemporary Art, California
- Metropolitan Museum of Art, New York
- Montclair Art Museum, New Jersey
- Muscarelle Museum of Art, Virginia
- National Gallery of Canada, Ottawa
- Smithsonian National Museum of the American Indian, Washington, D.C.
- Neuberger Museum of Art, Purchase, New York
- Newark Museum, New Jersey
- New Jersey State Museum
- Peabody Essex Museum, Salem, Massachusetts
- San Diego Museum of Art
- Southern Plains Indian Museum, Anadarko, Oklahoma
- Spencer Museum of Art, Lawrence, Kansas
- Steinman Hall and Shepard Hall, City University of New York

=== Publications ===
- Kay WalkingStick Alfred Bierstadt. "Primal Visions: Albert Bierstadt 'Discovers' America," catalog essay, A Cherokee Artist Looks at the Landing of Columbus. Montclair Museum, New Jersey, 2001.
- Kay WalkingStick. "Democracy, Inc: Kay WalkingStick on Indian Law." Artforum 30, November 1991, pp. 20–21.
- Kay WalkingStick, "Native American Art in the Postmodern Era." Art Journal 51, Fall 1992, pp. 15–17.
- Kay WalkingStick, "So Fine! Masterworks of Fine Art from the Heard Museum," curator's essay, Great American Artists, Heard Museum, Phoenix, 2002.
- W. Jackson Rushing III and Kristin Makholm, foreword by Kay WalkingStick "Modern Spirit, The Art of George Morrison". University of Oklahoma Press: Norman, 2013.
- Kay WalkingStick, "Changing Hands: Art Without Reservation 3", essay "No Reservations," Museum of Art and Design 2012.
