= Terry Saul =

Choctaw/Chickasaw artist and educator (1921–1976)

Chief Terry Saul
- Born: Carl Terry Saul; April 2, 1921; Sardis, Oklahoma, U.S.
- Died: May 1976 (aged 54–55); Muskogee, Oklahoma, U.S.
- Other names: Tabaksi, C. Terry Saul
- Education: Bacone College, University of Oklahoma, Art Students League of New York

Chief Carl Terry Saul (1921–1976) also known as C. Terry Saul and Tabaksi, was a Choctaw Nation/Chickasaw illustrator, painter, muralist, commercial artist, and educator. He was a leader of the Choctaw/Chickasaw tribe. He served as Director of the art program at Bacone College in Muskogee, Oklahoma, from 1970 until 1976.

== Biography ==
Saul attended Bacone College, where he studied under Acee Blue Eagle, and Woody Crumbo. His classmates at Bacone College included Walter Richard “Dick” West Sr. and Oscar Howe, all of which started the early process of departing for traditional Native art and painting-styles, and moving towards Surrealism and engaging in modernist aesthetics.

He served in the United States Army during World War II. After the war, Saul continued his studies at University of Oklahoma, Norman (OU), where he received a BFA degree (1948) and MFA degree (1949); and at the Art Students League of New York, from 1951 to 1952. Saul was the first Native American student to receive a MFA degree from the University of Oklahoma.

In 1960, he lived in Bartlesville, Oklahoma and in addition to painting, Saul worked at the Phillips Petroleum Company. He is known for his watercolor paintings, and casein paintings depicting Plains Tribes heritage and ceremonies. He later returned to teach at Bacone College, where he served as the Director of the art program from 1970 to 1976. One of his students was Joan Brown.

His artwork is in museum collections, including the Gilcrease Museum, Fred Jones Jr. Museum of Art, and the Philbrook Museum of Art.

== Publications ==
- Grerory, Jack; Strickland, Rennard (1972). Choctaw Spirit Tales. Chief Terry Saul (illustrations), Indian Heritage Association (1st ed.). Muskogee, OK: Hoffman Printing Company.
