= Carl Sweezy =

American painter

- Wó’oteen
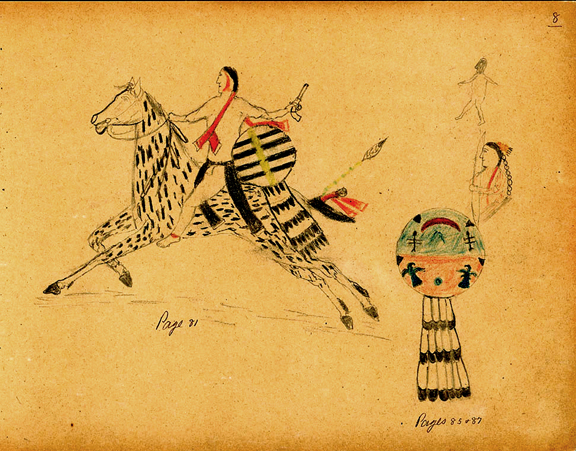
- Ledger drawing by Carl Sweezy, 1904
- Born: c. 1879 near Darlington Agency, Indian Territory
- Died: May 28, 1953; Lawton, Oklahoma
- Citizenship: Southern Arapaho, United States
- Education: Carlisle Indian Industrial School, Chilocco Indian Agricultural School
- Known for: painting
- Style: Southern Plains Flatstyle painting
- Father: Hinan Ba Seth
- Patrons: James Mooney

Carl Sweezy (c. 1879–1953) was a Southern Arapaho painter from Oklahoma. He painted individual portraits, but was best known for his portrayals of ceremonies and dances.

== Background ==
Carl Sweezy was born around 1879 near the Darlington Agency on the Cheyenne and Arapaho Indian Reservation in Indian Territory. His Arapaho name was Wó’oteen (new Arapaho orthography; old spelling - Wattan), meaning "Black." Sweezy's father was Hinan Ba Seth, meaning "Big Man." His tribe still hunted buffalo when he was a child.

Sweezy's mother died early, so he lived full-time at the Mennonite Mission School at Darlington Agency. He later attended the Mennonite Boarding School of Halstead, Kansas, Carlisle Indian Boarding School in Pennsylvania, and Chilocco Indian Agricultural School, north of Ponca City, Oklahoma. For a season Sweezy was a professional baseball player, and later he worked as a tribal policeman. Although he never received formal art training, he loved drawing and painting from an early age. An agency employee encouraged him with a gift of watercolor paints.

== Artwork ==
Around 1895, when Sweezy was 14 years old, ethnographer James Mooney commissioned Sweezy to paint images of traditional Arapaho life. Later, Sweezy also worked with anthropologist George Dorsey. Sweezy continued to be a prolific painter, expanding his media and materials into the mid-20th century. By the 1920s Sweezy was a full-time painter.

Sweezy worked in watercolors on paper and oil on canvas, as well as house paint on board. He was one of Cheyenne artist Dick West's first artistic mentors. Although he painted individual portraits, he is known for his portrayals of ceremonies and dances, sometimes with over a dozen individual figures, with implied action and narrative. Sweezy developed a technique, employed by later Southern Plains artists, of painting an active Native American Church meeting by rolling up the tipi flaps to reveal the participants inside.

== Public collections ==
Sweezy's work can be found in the following public art collections:

- Cleveland Museum of Natural History
- Fred Jones Jr. Museum of Art
- The George Gustav Heye Center
- Gilcrease Museum
- Heard Museum
- Indian Arts and Crafts Board, US Department of the Interior
- Oklahoma History Center
- National Museum of the American Indian, Washington DC
- Oklahoma Museum of Natural History
- Philbrook Museum of Art
- Southwest Museum, Los Angeles
- University of Oklahoma, Library

== Death ==
Carl Sweezy died on May 28, 1953 in Lawton, Oklahoma.

== Quotes ==
The corn road, we found, was different from the buffalo road in more ways than anyone, white or Indian, had realized, and the old people could not learn it in a hurry. —Carl Sweezy

With war horses running, feathers and banners flying on the wind from spears and lances, shields and quivers shining at men's sides and shoulders, and women singing war songs for their men, I think a war party setting out, or coming in victorious, must have been one of the splendid things in life to see. If I had to miss that, I have had the next best thing: I have seen old warriors wearing their fine trappings, and I have heard them tell their stories... –Carl Sweezy, 1950
