= Marie Wadley =

Marie L. Wadley
- Born: December 16, 1906; Pensacola, Oklahoma
- Died: September 23, 2009 (aged 102); Muskogee, Oklahoma
- Citizenship: Shawnee Tribe, American
- Occupation: Bureau of Indian Affairs
- Known for: co-founder of the Five Civilized Tribes Museum

Marie L. Wadley (December 16, 1906 – September 23, 2009) was a Native American cofounder of the Five Civilized Tribes Museum in Muskogee, Oklahoma. Wadley became the museum's first president after its opening.

== Early life ==
Marie Wadley was born in Pensacola, Indian Territory, on December 16, 1906, less than a year before the territory became the U.S. state of Oklahoma in 1907.

Wadley was Shawnee and Cherokee. She was raised on a farm near Vinita, Oklahoma. In 1923, Wadley moved to Muskogee to enroll at Draughon Business College.

== Career ==
Wadley took the civil service exam and in 1925 she was hired for her first, and "only" job as a staff member with the Bureau of Indian Affairs (BIA). She was initially hired as a clerk stenographer. Years later, Wadley, who championed Native American causes throughout her life, spoke of her experience with the BIA,

I got a job for $95 a month. That was more than anything then. I thought I was rich. I found a job with the U.S. Government and worked there for 42 years. I started as a clerk stenographer, and I just worked real hard every day ... I worked with the Indian people out in the community. I worked with families, went into their homes, reported their needs. The work gave me opportunity to visit in Washington, D.C., and learn. It took me to Mississippi to the Choctaws and the Seminoles of Florida.

Wadley, as an employee of the Bureau of Indian Affairs (BIA), worked to get a bill introduced into the U.S. Congress in the 1950s aimed at establishing a Native American museum in the Union Agency building in Muskogee, Oklahoma. The Union Agency building had been constructed by the Bureau of Indian Affairs in 1875.

In 1951, Wadley began working with then U.S. Representative David Boren (D-Oklahoma) to transfer ownership of the Union Agency building, as well as five acres of land surrounding the site, from the federal government to the city of Muskogee with the purpose of establishing the museum. U.S. President Dwight Eisenhower signed the bill into law in 1953, returning the Union Agency and the five acres back to local control.

Wadley worked with local political and community figures to plan new museum over the next thirteen years. She wanted a historically accurate museum which would correctly depict and display the local Native American culture of eastern Oklahoma.

=== Museum ===
The Five Civilized Tribes Museum, which showcases the history, culture and art of the Cherokee, Chickasaw, Choctaw, Creek and Seminole Native American tribes, officially opened on April 16, 1966. Wadley became the first president of the new museum's board of directors.

== Later life ==
Wadley retired from the Bureau of Indian Affairs in 1967, after a 42-year career with the agency. She was a tribal relations officer at the time of her retirement.

Marie Wadley died at her home in Muskogee, Oklahoma, on September 23, 2009, at the age of 102. Her funeral was held at the St. Paul Methodist Church in Muskogee.
