= Jeanne Rorex-Bridges =

American painter

- Born: 1951 (age 74–75); Muskogee County, Oklahoma
- Other name: Jeanne Walker Rorex
- Education: Bacone College; Northeastern Oklahoma State University
- Occupations: Painter, illustrator
- Years active: 1985–present
- Relatives: Willard Stone (Uncle)

Jeanne Rorex-Bridges (also known as Jeanne Walker Rorex, born 1951) is painter and illustrator based in Oklahoma. She is a member of the Echota Cherokee Tribe of Alabama, a state-recognized tribe.

Most known for her work in the Bacone flatstyle, Rorex-Bridges work typically reflects Native American and women of African descent as they live their daily lives. She has illustrated 16 books, including Crossing Bok Chitto by Tim Tingle (Choctaw) and was interviewed as part of the Oklahoma Native Artist Oral History Project at Oklahoma State University.

== Early life ==
Jeanne Walker was born in 1951 in Muskogee County, Oklahoma to Allie E. (née Stone) and Louis E. "Buster" Walker. Walker was raised on a farm near Oktaha, Oklahoma, along with her six siblings. Her mother's family claimed Cherokee heritage, and her maternal uncle was the internationally known sculptor Willard Stone. She attended school in Oktaha and graduated in 1969 with the last class to attend the Old Oktaha High School. In 1971, she married Kenneth Rorex, with whom she had two sons. After her sons were older, Rorex returned to school in 1978, studying with Dick West and Ruthe Blalock Jones at Bacone College. After graduating as class salutatorian in 1980, she enrolled at Northeastern Oklahoma State University and graduated with a degree in graphic art.

== Career ==
Rorex's art uses the Bacone flatstyle, which employs little shading or dimension. Many of her paintings revolve around women, their work tending children and crops, and the different phases of their life, such as pregnancy, motherhood or friendship. She also incorporates symbolism, using native motifs like corn, and the sun and moon as woman's companion. Her figures typically are placed in landscape settings. She began exhibiting her art at regional events for Native American artists, winning numerous awards. She won the Jerome Tiger Memorial Award at the Trail of Tears Art Show hosted at the Cherokee Heritage Center in Park Hill, Oklahoma, for three consecutive years and won the award five times in total. In 1988, she was invited along with other artists to participate in the Cherokee Legends Exhibit at the Museum of the Cherokee Indian in Cherokee, North Carolina.

In 1990, concerns with non-Indigenous people marketing imitation Native art led to passage of the Indian Arts and Crafts Act. Passage of the law meant that people who were not enrolled in recognized federal or state tribes or not tribally-designated artisans were unable to market their wares as "Indian artists". The law made it possible for violators to be subject to a five-year prison term or fines up to $1,000,000. The passage of the law created factions — those who believed it eliminated false advertising and misappropriation of traditional knowledge, those who believed it prevented poseurs from impersonating Native people, and those like Rorex, whose livelihoods were threatened. Describing herself as a "Native American artist" while selling her paintings could have resulted in fines or jail time. Though the law made provisions for non-members to be certified as "artisans" by a recognized tribe, Rorex refused to petition the council, believing such a request would imply "that her family, relatives and ancestors were all frauds" and their resistance to enrollment was dishonorable.

In 1991, when the Cherokee Tribal Council passed a resolution for her uncle Willard Stone to be a certified Cherokee artisan, Rorex and other members of the Stone family asked that the certification be withdrawn, as it recognized his work, but not his heritage. In 2009 she was honored as a Master Artist at the Five Civilized Tribes Museum, the Philbrook Museum of Art's American Indian Heritage Competition, or the Tsa-La-Gi Annual, among other events. The Thomas Jefferson Center for the Protection of Free Expression took up her case and the argument of individual autonomy in violation of her First Amendment rights. No legislative action came of the involvement and in 1996, the protocols for enforcement of the act were finalized.

Rorex was featured in a month-long solo exhibition in 1995, Harmony, Strength and the Spiritual: The Art of Jeanne Walker Rorex, held at the Institute for American Indian Studies in Washington, Connecticut. The following year, another solo exhibition hosted by the Red Cloud Gallery in St. Petersburg, Florida, showcased her art. The gallery had hosted some of her works over the previous five years, but the exhibition featured more than 200 pieces of her work. Around 2000, Rorex married James R. Bridges and changed her professional name to Jeanne Rorex-Bridges. Though she continued to produce artworks, she had to market herself as an Oklahoma artist. The couple traveled extensively, marketing her works in 17 different states, participating in events like the annual Rio Grande Arts & Crafts Festival of Albuquerque, New Mexico and the Native American and Wildlife Art Festival of Atlanta.

In 2011, Rorex-Bridges had to learn how to paint left-handed after a stroke. Changing her former stance, she became an enrolled member of the state-recognized Echota Cherokee Tribe of Alabama, a tribe whose validity is questioned by the three federally-recognized Cherokee tribal governments.

Rorex-Bridges' work has been featured on the cover of numerous books and she has worked as an illustrator, having 16 nationally published books to her credit. One of these, Crossing Bok Chitto, an award-winning children's book by Tim Tingle (Choctaw) features 18 of her paintings to illustrate the story of a Choctaw girl who helped a slave boy escape from pre-Civil War Mississippi. Another series she painted, Sisters (1991–1995), focused on the interconnections between African and indigenous people, as well as their shared ancestry. The series highlights their shared history, as there were many people of African descent who were forcibly relocated with Native people in the Trail of Tears. In 2012, she was interviewed as part of the Oklahoma Native Artist Oral History Project of Oklahoma State University.

In 2016, the State of Oklahoma passed legislation which barred people who were members of state recognized tribes from showing their works. Rorex-Bridges, Peggy Fontenot, and others were once again barred from participating in major Native Art shows. They were allowed to return to venues in 2017, after Peggy Fontenot filed a lawsuit challenging the law, and the Attorney General of the State of Oklahoma agreed to stay enforcement of the law while the case was pending. In 2019, the United States District Court for the Western District of Oklahoma declared the state law unconstitutional, and permanently enjoined the law from being enforced in the future, on the grounds that the federal Indian Arts and Crafts Act of 1990 preempted Oklahoma's more restrictive law. Since the federal statute allowed artists who were members of any tribe in the United States, the state law could not narrow that to artists who were members of a federally recognized tribe. That year, she was one of the artists featured in the Women of the Five Civilized Tribes Exhibit hosted by the Five Civilized Tribes Museum of Muskogee, Oklahoma.
