= W. Richard West Jr. =

Founding director of the Smithsonian National Museum of the American Indian

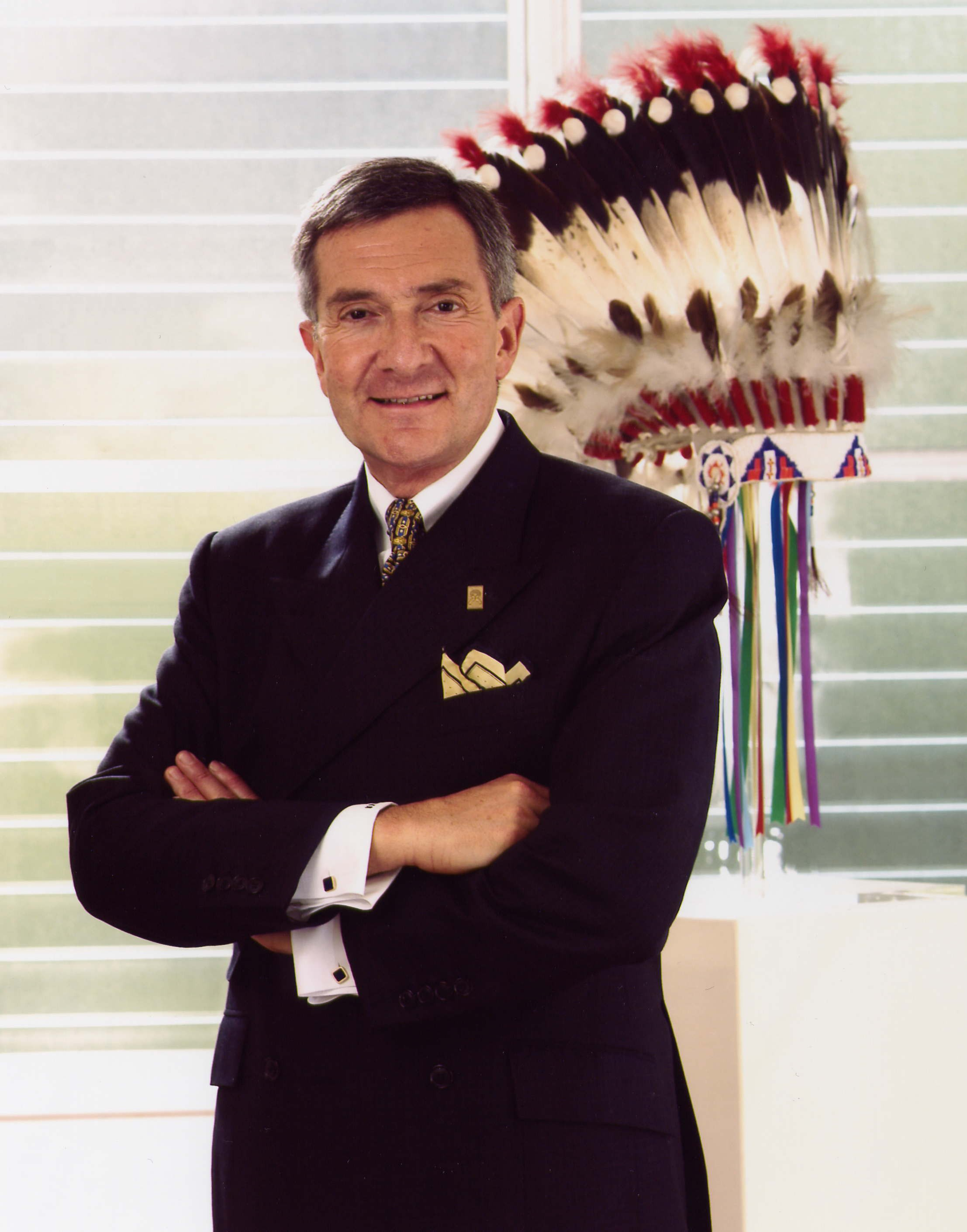
- Born: Walter Richard West Jr. January 6, 1943 (age 83); San Bernardino, California, US
- Citizenship: Cheyenne and Arapaho Tribes, United States
- Spouse: Mary Beth Braden
- Children: 2

Walter Richard "Rick" West Jr. (born January 6, 1943) is a museum director, with a focus on Native American Museums. Until 2000, he was the president and CEO of the Autry Museum of the American West in Los Angeles. He was the founding director of the Smithsonian National Museum of the American Indian, retiring from the position in 2007. He is also a citizen of the Cheyenne and Arapaho Tribes in Oklahoma and a Peace Chief of the Southern Cheyenne. His professional life has been devoted to serving the American Indian community on cultural, artistic, educational, legal and governmental issues.

== Background ==
Born in San Bernardino, California, West grew up in a log cabin in Muskogee, Oklahoma. He is the son of Maribelle McCrea West, a Baptist minister's daughter of Scottish-American background and the late Walter Richard West Sr. (Southern Cheyenne, 1912–1996). His father, "Dick" West, was a well-respected Cheyenne painter, who chaired the art department at Bacone College.

Richard West earned a bachelor of arts degree in American history, graduating magna cum laude in 1965 and graduated Phi Beta Kappa from the University of Redlands in California. He also received a master's degree in American history from Harvard University in 1968. West graduated from Stanford Law School with a doctor of jurisprudence degree in 1971, where he also was the recipient of the Hilmer Oehlmann Jr. Prize for excellence in legal writing and served as an editor and note editor of the Stanford Law Review.

== Professional career ==
West was a partner in the Washington, D.C., office of Fried, Frank, Harris, Shriver & Jacobson, and, subsequently, in the Indian-owned Albuquerque law firm of Gover, Stetson, Williams & West, P.C. During his law career, West served as both a general counsel and special counsel to a wide range of tribes and non-tribal organizations, before tribal, state, and federal and tribal courts. He also represented clients before several executive departments of the U.S. Federal Government and the Congress.

During his tenure in the Smithsonian, the Washington Post exposed his lavish travel expenses and a gala farewell celebration. This is part of a general crackdown on Smithsonian expenses by the General Accounting Office. West has stated that the travel was for museum business and approved by supervisors. After conducting an investigation at the request of the United States Congress, the Smithsonian Institution's inspector general found that West "should have exercised better judgment." West has agreed to reimburse the Smithsonian $9,700. The Smithsonian Office of the Inspector General, A. Sprightley Ryan, published a 42-page report on October 28, 2008 responding to media reports and congressional requests.

From 2006 to 2007, West served as the Wayne Morse Chair of Law and Politics, established in honor of the late former Senator, at the University of Oregon.. From 2007 to 2010, he was Vice President of the International Council of Museums. In 2011, he was appointed as the Interim Director for the Textile Museum in Washington D.C. Since 2011, he has served on the board of directors of the Native Arts and Cultures Foundation. In 2012, the Association of Tribal Archives, Libraries, & Museums (ATALM) honored West with a Guardians of Culture and Lifeways International Award and the Autry Museum of the American West designated West as the new President and CEO, where he served until his retirement in 2020. He was credited with transforming the museum and championing contemporary Native American artists.

== Personal life ==
West married Mary Beth Braden, a fellow Stanford graduate. She is the professor of political science at the National Defense University, Industrial College of the Armed Forces. Together they have two adult children, Amy and Ben.
