= W. Richard West Sr. =

Cheyenne painter from Oklahoma (1912–1996)

Dick West
- Wapah Nahyah
- Born: Walter Richard West Sr. September 8, 1912; Canadian County, Oklahoma
- Died: May 3, 1996 (aged 83)
- Citizenship: Cheyenne and Arapaho Tribes, United States
- Education: Concho Indian Boarding School and Haskell Institute
- Alma mater: Bacone College (AA), University of Oklahoma (MFA)
- Style: Bacone school painting
- Spouse(s): Maribelle McCrea, Rene Wagoner
- Children: Rick West, James Lee West
- Parents: Lightfoot West. (father); Rena Flying Coyote (mother)

Walter Richard West Sr. (1912–1996, Southern Cheyenne), was a painter, sculptor, and educator. He led the Art Department at Bacone College from 1947 to 1970. He later taught at Haskell Institute for several years. West was an enrolled citizen of the Cheyenne and Arapaho Tribes.

== Early life and education ==
West was born on September 8, 1912, in a tipi near the Darlington Agency in Oklahoma. His Cheyenne name, Wapah Nahyah, means "Lightfooted Runner." His father was Lightfoot West. His mother was Rena Flying Coyote, also known as Emily Black Wolf, whose parents were Big Belly Woman and Thunder Bull.

West attended Concho Indian Boarding School and Haskell Institute in Lawrence, Kansas. At that time, Haskell had grades 9-12 and served as a high school; he graduated in 1935. (It later gained status as a junior college and then as a four-year college.) One of his earliest artistic mentors was painter Carl Sweezy (Southern Arapaho, 1881–1953).

From 1936 to 1938, West attended Bacone College in Muskogee, Oklahoma, where he earned an associate degree. At Bacone, West studied under celebrated artist, Acee Blue Eagle (Muscogee, 1907–1959). His classmates at Bacone College included Terry Saul (Choctaw Nation) and Oscar Howe (Dakota).

As a young man, West played football and worked in oil fields.

West enrolled at University of Oklahoma (OU), where he earned a BFA degree in 1941. He later returned for graduate work, earning an MFA degree in 1950. While at OU, he studied under Swedish-American artist Oscar Jacobson (1882–1996), who mentored the Kiowa Six, other Native American artists. West felt that Jacobson's active support of Native Americans helped him cope with the widespread racial prejudice that he encountered in the city of Norman. Together Saul, Howe, and West were the first Native Americans to earn master of fine arts degrees.

In 1941 and 1942, West lived in Phoenix, Arizona, where he studied mural painting under Olle Nordmark (1890–1973), a Swedish-American artist and sculptor. West continued post-graduate studies at Northeastern State University, University of Tulsa, and Redlands College.

== Marriage and family ==
In 1940, West married Maribelle McCrea. They had two sons together, W. Richard West Jr. and James Lee West. In 1970, he married his second wife, Rene Wagoner.

== Teaching career ==
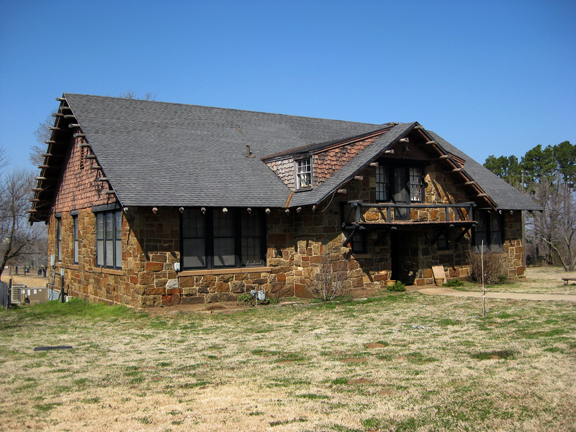
Ataloa Lodge, art museum on Bacone College campus, Muskogee, OK

In 1941, West began his first teaching assignment at the Phoenix Indian School, serving primarily Navajo students. After the United States entered World War II, he joined the US Navy the next year and fought in Europe, serving from 1942 to postwar 1946. Upon his honorable discharge, West returned to teaching at the Phoenix Indian School.

Bacone College in Muskogee, Oklahoma hired West. He taught from 1947 to 1970 and became head of the art department. From 1970 to 1977, West taught art at Haskell Indian Junior College in Kansas. He influenced generations of Native American artists. His students included such successful artists as Joan Hill (Muscogee/Cherokee), Enoch Kelly Haney (Seminole/Muscogee), Johnny Tiger Jr. (Muscogee/Seminole), Sharron Ahtone Harjo (Kiowa), Marlene Riding In-Mameah (Pawnee), and Virginia Stroud (Keetoowah Cherokee/Muscogee).

From 1979 to 1980, West served as professor emeritus at Bacone College and directed the Ataloa Lodge Museum.

== Artwork ==
Dick West was a master of Flatstyle painting that drew upon the pictorial and narrative aspects of Plains hide painting. Flatstyle painting frequently portrays tribal dances and histories. His works portrayed Cheyenne culture, as informed by his culturally informed upbringing.

A complete departure from that style was West's Indian Christ series, which were lush, allegorical oil paintings of New Testament stories with Native American figures, set in the Southern Plains. Through this series, West wanted to portray the universality of Jesus.

Although Flatstyle is what he is best known for, West also painted abstract and highly stylized works in oil, watercolor, distemper, and gouache. He illustrated four books and also sculpted in wood and metal.

== Awards and honors ==
The Section of Painting and Sculpture commissioned West to paint a mural for the U.S. Post Office of Okemah, Oklahoma in 1941. He won two grand awards from the Philbrook Museum. In 1964, he won the Waite Phillips Outstanding Indian Artist Award from the Philbrook Museum of Art.

In 1962, the Eastern Baptist College awarded him an honorary doctorates in humane letters, as did the Baker University, in 1976. From 1979 to 1980, West was a commissioner on the Indian Arts and Crafts Board.

== Public collections ==
West's work can be found in the following public art collections:

- Bacone College
- Bureau of Indian Affairs
- Denver Art Museum
- Eastern Baptist College, St. David's, PA
- Fred Jones Jr. Museum of Art
- The George Gustav Heye Center, National Museum of the American Indian, New York, NY
- Gilcrease Museum
- Indian Arts and Crafts Board, US Department of the Interior
- Joslyn Art Museum
- Koshare Indian Museum
- Museum of Northern Arizona, Katherine Harvey Collection
- Muskogee Art Guild, OK
- National Gallery of Art
- Philbrook Museum of Art
- St. Augustine's Center, Chicago, IL
- Seminole Public Library, OK
- Southern Plains Indian Museum
- University of Oklahoma, Library

== Death ==
Dick West died on May 3, 1996.

== Quote ==
"[T]he Indian artist must be allowed freedom to absorb influences outside of his own art forms and see the promise of a new lane of expression that should keep the Indian's art the art form termed 'native Indian painting,' and I give my student every opportunity to execute it... I have always felt that the term abstraction has been a part of the Indian's artistic thinking longer than most European contemporary influences and perhaps in a [truer] form..." —Dick West, 1955
