= Jerome Tiger =

American painter

Jerome R. Tiger
- Stomp Dance (1967), painting by Jerome Tiger, Oklahoma History Center
- Born: July 8, 1941; Talequah, Oklahoma
- Died: August 13, 1967 (aged 26)
- Other names: Jerome Richard Tiger
- Citizenship: Muscogee Nation and U.S.
- Occupation: painter
- Years active: 1962–1967

Jerome Richard Tiger (July 8, 1941 – August 13, 1967) was a Muscogee Nation/Seminole painter from Oklahoma. Tiger produced hundreds of paintings from 1962 until his death in 1967.

A fullblood Muscogee Creek-Seminole, Tiger's style is said to be a combination of "spiritual vision, humane understanding, and technical virtuosity" but with traditional subject matter and composition.

His paintings first gained recognition at the Philbrook Museum of Art.

== Early life ==
Born in Tahlequah, Oklahoma on July 8, 1941, Tiger attended public schools in Eufaula, Oklahoma and Muskogee, Oklahoma. English was not his first language. He was a citizen of the Muscogee Nation and was also of Seminole descent.

Dropping out of high school at the age of 16, Tiger joined the United States Navy and served in the Naval Reserve from 1958 to 1960. He also worked as a laborer and prize fighter. He studied at the Cleveland Engineering Institute in Cleveland, Ohio, but dropped out after one year. Tiger married Peggy Richmond and they had three children.

== Artistic career ==
In 1962, a friend encouraged Tiger to submit his paintings to the American Indian Artists Annual at the Philbrook Museum of Art in Tulsa, Oklahoma. He began to produce a prolific number of paintings over the next several years, winning numerous awards. In 1966, the Philbrook Museum of Art displayed a solo exhibit of Tiger's art. During this time, he lived in Muskogee, Oklahoma.

Tiger was compared to Rembrandt and Francisco Goya because of his ability to draw an object or person after a short glance. He worked in oil, watercolor, tempera, casein, pencil, and pen and ink.

== Death and legacy ==
Tiger died from a handgun accident at the age of 26. In the early hours of August 13, 1967, after a night of shooting at fence posts with friends, a bullet discharged accidentally from his . 22-caliber handgun, killing him instantly and ending his promising career. His art can be found at the National Cowboy and Western Heritage Museum in Oklahoma City, Oklahoma, Philbrook and Gilcrease Museums in Tulsa, Oklahoma, the OSU Museum of Art in Stillwater, Oklahoma, the Five Civilized Tribes Museum in Muskogee, Oklahoma, the Woolaroc Museum near Bartlesville, Oklahoma, the Museum of New Mexico in Santa Fe, New Mexico, the Museum of the American Indian and the Bureau of Indian Affairs.

Jerome's brother Johnny Tiger, Jr. and daughter Dana Tiger are successful artists. His son Chris, who was a budding artist, was killed in 1990. Jerome's other daughter, Lisa Tiger, is a prominent AIDS educator and activist as well as a motivational speaker. In addition to his immediate family, many of Tiger's relatives were also artists, including Edmond Joshua, Jr. (1936–2005) and his brother Lee Roy Joshua (died 2001). Both were primarily painters working in oil, acrylic, watercolor and other media, and Edmond also worked in sculpture.

== See also ==
- Bacone school
- List of Native American artists from Oklahoma
