= Mirac Creepingbear =

American painter

Mirac Creepingbear was a Kiowa / Pawnee / Arapaho painter from Oklahoma who played a pivotal role in mid-20th century Native American art.

== Background ==
Creepingbear was born in Lawton, Oklahoma, on September 8, 1947, the son of Rita Littlechief (Kiowa) and Ted Creepingbear (Pawnee–Arapaho). He was a citizen of the Kiowa Indian Tribe of Oklahoma and was also of Pawnee and Arapaho descent. He began painting in 1974 as a self-taught artist.

== Education ==
Creepingbear was educated at Carnegie Oklahoma High School and the South Community College in Oklahoma City, Oklahoma. He also attended Oklahoma State University's School of Technology in Okmulgee, Oklahoma. He was a muralist and painter, who began painting actively and professionally in 1974. He was commissioned to paint a mural in The Kiowa Tribal Complex in Carnegie, Oklahoma along with artists Parker Boyiddle, Jr. and Sherman Chaddlesone. The mural depicts the history of the Kiowa tribe from its original home in the Yellowstone territory to its establishment in the Great Plains region of the United States.

== Career ==
Creepingbear had a number of occupations including working for an electrical supply company before becoming a full-time painter in 1974. He is considered one of the more important of Oklahoma's traditional artists. His paintings, in oil, watercolor, acrylic and pastel, show a style that is fluid and dramatic and alludes to Native-American culture. He emulated the works of his Kiowa elders as well as American Western artists Frederic Remington and Charles Russell.

He worked with gallery owner Doris Littrell who helped promote his work. She provided him with shows, as well as serving as his main gallery and hosted both his first one-man show in 1981 and his final one-man show in 1990.

== Death ==
Mirac Creepingbear died on October 28, 1990, due to injuries sustained from an automobile accident. Alcohol was involved in the incident.
