= Peggy Tiger =

Cherokee Nation author and art gallery owner

- Born: Margaret Lois "Peggy" Richmond; February 14, 1943; Muskogee, Oklahoma, United States
- Died: February 18, 2017 (aged 74); Muskogee, Oklahoma, United States
- Education: Bacone College, Northeastern State University
- Alma mater: Northeastern State University
- Known for: author, business owner, Native American art gallery owner
- Spouse: Jerome Tiger
- Website: http://www.tigerartgallery.com

Margaret Lois “Peggy” Tiger (February 14, 1943 - February 18, 2017) was a Cherokee Nation author and art gallery owner in Oklahoma. The widow of painter Jerome Tiger, she served as the caretaker of her husband's artistic legacy since his death in 1967. She wrote one of the first biographies on the life of Jerome Tiger and his artwork. Tiger was also the mother of Cherokee artist and women's rights activist, Dana Tiger.

== Early life ==
Born in 1943, Peggy Tiger was raised in the towns of Muskogee and Eufaula, Oklahoma. In an oral history interview in 2012, she noted that she had had no interest in art until meeting Jerome Tiger, whom she married when she was eighteen. They had three children together, Dana, Lisa, and Christopher, who was two weeks old when Jerome was killed at the age of twenty-six in a gun accident. In the years following, Peggy Tiger would adopt three more children and act as an informal mother to many others, including the friends of her children. She also continued coursework at Bacone College and Northeastern State University, graduating from the latter with a bachelor's degree in American Studies.

== Career ==
After her husband's death, Tiger and her cousin, Molly Babcock, began collaborating with Bob Lengacher at Tulsa Litho to create limited-edition prints of Jerome's work. She and Molly formed the Jerome Tiger Art Company in 1969, and Molly traveled to promote the prints while Peggy ran the home office, answering the phone, taking orders, and informing potential buyers about the artist and his art. The two women also worked together on the 1980 book, The Life and Art of Jerome Tiger: War to Peace, Death to Life (University of Oklahoma Press, 1980), which was both a detailed biography as well as an art book.

The Tiger Art Gallery was formed later, and Peggy ran that for many years. Originating as a T-shirt business to sell the designs of Johnny Tiger, Jerome's brother, it later became even more of a family affair. Today it includes Johnny's work as well as that of two of Peggy and Jerome's children, Dana and Chris (who was killed in a 1990 shooting), and Dana's children, Christie and Lisan.

Beginning in 2004, Peggy worked for the Cherokee Nation as a researcher and writer. She has been involved in community life in many ways, including serving as the Tulsa representative for the HIV-awareness group, “Positively Native,” after her daughter Lisa tested positive in 1992. Lisa is a well-known AIDS activist and motivational speaker.

== Death ==
Peggy Tiger passed away in Muskogee, Oklahoma on February 18, 2017.
