= Dana Tiger =

Muscogee artist of Seminole and Cherokee descent

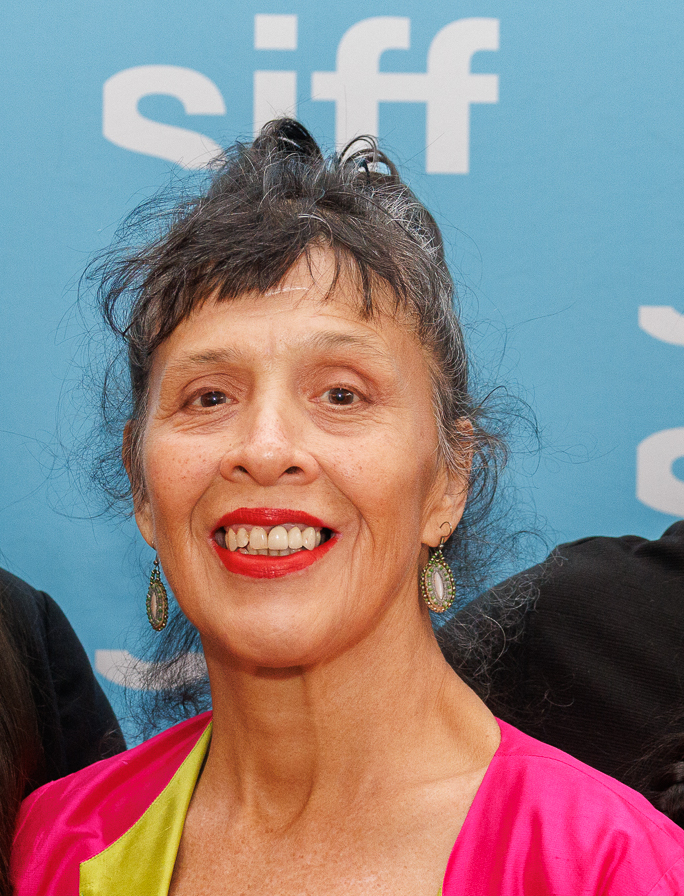
- Tiger at the 2025 Seattle International Film Festival
- Born: Dana Irene Tiger; 1961 (age 64–65); Muskogee, Oklahoma
- Education: Oklahoma State University, Bacone College
- Occupation: artist
- Years active: 1985–present
- Website: www.tigerartgallery.com/art/

Dana Tiger (born 1961) is a Muscogee artist of Seminole and Cherokee descent from Oklahoma. Her artwork focuses on portrayals of strong women. She uses art as a medium for activism and raising awareness. Tiger was inducted into the Oklahoma Women's Hall of Fame in 2001.

== Biography ==
Dana Irene Tiger was born in 1961 to Jerome Tiger and Peggy Richmond. Her father was a full blood Native American of Muskogee-Seminole heritage and her mother is a member of the Cherokee Nation. Tiger's father died of an accidental gunshot wound when she was 5 years old and she was raised by her mother. To promote her father's work, keep his legacy alive, and be taken seriously as an art dealer, Tiger's mother ran the business pretending to be a man. Jerome's brother, Johnny Tiger Jr., acted as the family patriarch, told stories of their father to his children, and surrounded them with art.

Tiger attended Oklahoma State University from 1981 to 1984 as a student in the College of Arts and Sciences. She later attended Bacone College.

Tiger first began painting at age 24, after she left Oklahoma State University. Dana was inspired by the legacy of her father, Jerome Tiger, an exemplary artist who revolutionized the portrayal of Native Americans through his unique art style. Her themes of strong women grew out of personal experiences of discrimination and tragedy. She uses art as a medium to empower women. Dana's art is often centered around her sense of womanhood and the strength of those that surround her. Characteristics of her paintings are resilient Native women depicted in both historical and contemporary leadership positions, usually in watercolor or acrylic.

Tiger often combines artwork and advocacy, promoting benefits for the AIDS Coalition for Indian Outreach, the American Cancer Society, the National Organization for Women, and the Ozark Literacy Council among others. Native American health is a particular focus. While promoting healing and growth through art, she is also a mother, sister, and grandmother.

== Personal life ==
Tiger had planned to remain single and dedicate her life to art, but when her brother was murdered in 1990 and her sister was diagnosed with HIV/AIDS two years later, her view of the world changed. She felt that she could honor her siblings by bringing new life into the world. Tiger married Donnie Blair on 7 November 1992. They have two children: a daughter Christie, born 1 September 1993, named after her brother, and a son, Coleman Lisan, born 16 July 1995, named for her sister. Both of her children are award-winning artists.

In 1999, Tiger was diagnosed with Parkinson's disease. Soon after her diagnosis, Tiger's sister Lisa was also diagnosed with Parkinson's.

In 2002, she founded a non-profit organization, Legacy Cultural Learning Community, to foster arts development for Native youth.

== Notable works ==
Tiger's painting We Ride Again was chosen as the cover art for the 2006 Oklahoma Women's Almanac.

A collection of Tiger's work was shown as a part of the Oklahoma Painters exhibition at the Grand Palais, Paris in 2011. She was one of 11 Native American artists who was selected to show at the exhibition.

Some of Tiger's other notable works include:

- Totkv 2017 Apex Magazine Cover
- Changing The Face of Leadership 2006
- Patrol of the Light Horse 1990 National Police Chiefs Convention, Tulsa, OK.
- Courage and Culture 1992 AIDS Coalition for Indian Outreach
- "Circle of Life" 1993 American Cancer Society, Breast Cancer Awareness Project for Native American Women
- Under Control 1993 American Indian College Fund
- Beautiful New Worlds 1993 Ozark Literacy Council
- Keeping Cultures Fires Burning 1993 National Organization for Women, Oklahoma State Conference
- The Healing Dream 1994 Follies, Inc., AIDS Benefit
- Wisdom from the Past, Strength for the Future 1995 Conference on the State of the American Indian Family

== Awards ==
- Youngest Master Artist by Five Civilized Tribes Museum
- Two Best in Show awards at the Five Civilized Tribes Museum Annual Student Art Show
- First Place, Watercolor Division, 1988 Tulsa Indian Art Festival, Tulsa, Oklahoma
- Special Merit Award, 1988 Trail of Tears Art Show, Tahlequah, Oklahoma
- Featured Artist, 1989 Tulsa Indian Art Festival, Tulsa, Oklahoma
- Creek Nation Artist of the Year
- First People's Fund Community Spirit Award, 2001
- Inductee, Oklahoma Women's Hall of Fame, 2001
