= Willard Stone =

American artist (1916–1985)

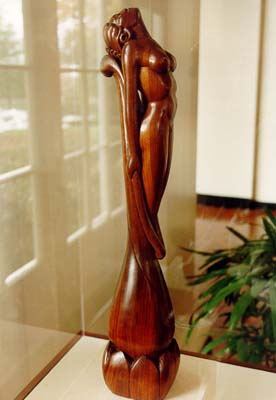
- "Lady of Spring", walnut sculpture, 27.5" x 5" x 5.5". White House photo.
- Born: February 29, 1916; Oktaha, Oklahoma
- Died: March 5, 1985 (aged 69); Locust Grove, Oklahoma
- Citizenship: United States
- Education: Bacone College, Muskogee, Oklahoma
- Known for: Sculpture, Wood carving
- Patrons: Thomas Gilcrease

Willard Stone (February 29, 1916 – March 5, 1985) was an American artist from Oklahoma best known for his wood sculptures carved in a flowing Art Deco style.

== Background ==
Stone was born and raised in Oktaha, Oklahoma. Stone's early interest in drawing and painting was thwarted when, at the age of 13, he picked up a blasting cap he found while walking home from school, and it exploded. Stone lost the thumb and most of two fingers on his right hand. He nevertheless became an accomplished sculptor and woodcarver. He took art classes at Bacone College, where he studied under Acee Blue Eagle (Muscogee) and Woody Crumbo (Citizen Potawatomi). Crumbo used his influence with oilman and collector Thomas Gilcrease (Muscogee) to further Stone's career, and in 1946 Gilcrease offered Stone an artist-in-residence position at the Gilcrease Museum in Tulsa. Stone worked for Gilcrease for three years. He developed a distinctive modern style influenced by Art Deco and Art Nouveau, and took on contemporary topics such as nuclear warfare as well as less stylized works inspired by nature. After leaving Gilcrease, Stone worked in Tulsa at an iron works and for Douglas Aircraft Company.

== Art career ==
After 1961, Stone was able to devote himself entirely to art, and he opened a permanent studio in Locust Grove, Oklahoma, from which he continued to work until his death in 1985. Stone was inducted into the Oklahoma Hall of Fame in 1970 and received honorary degrees from Bacone College and Oklahoma Christian College.

Stone, Crumbo, and Blue Eagle became the Oklahoman artists most closely identified with Gilcrease. Gilcrease ultimately acquired more than 50 of Stone's works. In addition to the large collection at Gilcrease, Stone's art is collected in many other museums, including the Five Civilized Tribes Museum in Muskogee, the Cherokee Heritage Center in Park Hill, the Smithsonian, the Fred Jones Jr. Museum of Art at the University of Oklahoma, the Great Plains Art Museum at the University of Nebraska–Lincoln, and the Museum of Western Art (formerly the Cowboy Artists of America Museum) in Kerrville, Texas.

Stone identified as being of Cherokee descent but was not an enrolled citizen of any Cherokee tribes, making his claims of Native American identity a source of controversy. The Cherokee Nation, during Chief Wilma Mankiller's administration, designated Stone as a tribal artisan in 1991, which allowed him to present his artwork as being American Indian-made under the 1990 Indian Arts and Crafts Act.

Stone's sculpture Exodus, in the collection of the Cherokee Heritage Center, is especially well known and was used extensively in Cherokee publications. Stone's "Lady of Spring" was included in the 1997-98 White House art exhibition "Twentieth Century American Sculpture at The White House: Honoring Native America." The guide to the White House exhibition calls Stone "the unsung hero of Native American sculpture", and describes "Lady of Spring" (an elongated female nude) as "classic Art Deco," comparing it to the nudes of Alberto Vargas and "Spring Awakening" by Ferdinand Preiss.

In 2009, the Gilcrease Museum held its first major exhibition in 20 years devoted to Stone's work, entitled "Storyteller in Wood."

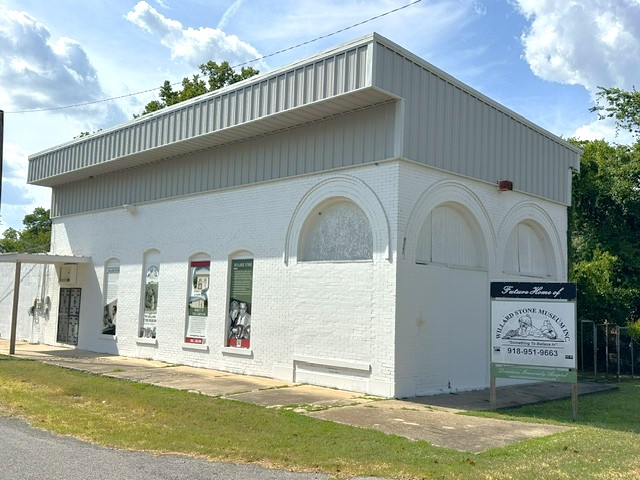
Anticipated future home of Willard Stone Museum at corner of Ross & Broadway in Locust Grove, August of 2026

== Willard Stone Museum ==
The Willard Stone Museum is currently located at his homeplace in Locust Grove, Oklahoma. The museum's goal is to relocate to the historic building that housed the first bank in Locust Grove, located in downtown and built in 1912, to house the collection. In 2019 the museum’s board of directors authorized build-out of the new facility, and in September 2020 launched a fundraising campaign to finance the needed renovations.

== Personal life ==
Stone, who died in 1985, was survived by son Jason M. “Briggs” Stone, a sculptor in his own right, who was born in 1945 and died in 2021. Other children included Irene “Skez” Stone, Nettie Sanders, Evelyn Holland, Lyda Henson, Linda Callery Grant Stone, Danny Stone, Dwight Stone, Rocky Stone, and Michel Stone.

Stone is the maternal uncle of painter and illustrator Jeanne Rorex-Bridges.
