= Phyllis Fife =

Native American painter from Oklahoma

- Born: Dustin, Oklahoma
- Citizenship: Muscogee (Creek) Nation and American
- Education: Ed.D. University of Arkansas
- Known for: Native American education, fashion design
- Style: Bacone school
- Awards: Mvskoke Hall of Fame; 2013 inductee

Phyllis Fife (born 1948) is a Muscogee Creek painter and educator from Oklahoma.

== Personal life and education ==
Fife was born near Dustin, Oklahoma to James Fife and Carmen Griffin Fife. She belongs to the Raccoon clan and Tukvpvtce Tribal Town. She was first educated in a rural school before enrolling in the Institute of American Indian Arts in Santa Fe from 1963 until 1966. She studied under Howard Warshaw at the University of California, Santa Barbara and transferred to the University of Oklahoma in 1970. At OU, she earned her BFA degree in 1973. She then earned her Master of Education degree at Northeastern State University and her Doctor of Education degree from the University of Arkansas.

Fife has three daughters.

== Art career ==
Fife was a fashion designer and painter, who exhibited in Oklahoma and nationalwide. Along with her sisters Sharon Fife Mouss, Sandy Fife Wilson and Jimmie Carole Fife Stewart, who are also visual artists, she launched the Fife Collection, a fashion design company that incorporated Southeastern Woodland aesthetics and was based in Henryetta, Oklahoma.

== Education career ==
Phyllis Fife has taught at Northeastern Oklahoma State University (NSU) and Southeastern Oklahoma State University. She served as the director of the Center for Tribal Studies at NSU from 2003 to 2014 and coordinated NSU's Symposium of the American Indian for many years in Tahlequah.

== Honors ==
In 2013, Fife was inducted into the Muscogee (Creek) Nation's Muskoke Hall of Fame.
