= Bert Seabourn =

American painter (1931–2022)

Bert Dail Seabourn
- Born: July 9, 1931; Redbarn, Pecos County, Texas, U.S.
- Died: November 17, 2022 (aged 91); Warr Acres, Oklahoma, U.S.
- Education: Oklahoma City University Purcell High School
- Alma mater: Oklahoma City University
- Known for: Paintings (oil, watercolor, acrylic)
- Notable work: Wind Walker
- Style: American Expressionist
- Spouse: Bonnie Jo (Tompkins) Seabourn
- Awards: Master Artist Designation; Governor's Arts Award; Honorary Doctor of Humane Letters; Paseo Arts Association Lifetime Achievement

Bert Dail Seabourn (July 9, 1931 – November 17, 2022) was an American expressionist painter, known for his stylized and nonrepresentational neo-expressionist artist. In his early career, he published comic book art and realistic pieces, as well as commercial art. He has won multiple awards for his artworks. An alumnus of Oklahoma City University, the school awarded him the honorary degree of Doctor of Humane Letters in 1997.

== Early life ==
Seabourn was born on July 9, 1931, at home in Redbarn, Pecos County, Texas, to James Augustus Seabourn and F. Leeper Thompson. On July 10, his family took him to the nearest hospital in Iraan, Texas, to obtain a birth certificate, causing Iraan to be listed as his place of birth. At the age of 5, Seabourn began to create cartoons, a passion he retained through his high school years. He attended McCamey school from first through sixth grades before moving to Alma, Arkansas, and subsequently to Van Buren. In 1944, Seabourn’s seventh grade year, his family moved to Purcell, Oklahoma, where he attended junior high and high school. That year Seabourn’s father would move to California alone, and eventually Seabourn’s parents would divorce, leading to his loss of contact with his father.

In the eighth grade, Seabourn sold one of his cartoons to the King Features Syndicate, and the cartoon was then published in an actual comic book. He would later attend Purcell High School and receive his diploma in 1950 having taken no formal art courses. Though he attended college for a short time in Tishomingo, Oklahoma, he put his education on hold to marry Bonnie Jo Tompkins. In 1955 he began night school at Oklahoma City University. While studying at the university, Seabourn worked as a freelance artist for companies such as Southwestern Bell and Oklahoma Today Magazine. Seabourn also began working for Oklahoma Gas and Electric Company, where he would maintain a position for twenty-three years. In 1961, Seabourn graduated from Oklahoma City University (OCU) with a Certificate of Art. In 1997, OCU granted him the honorary degree Doctor of Humane Letters.

== Military service ==
Seabourn joined the Navy in Oklahoma City, in November 1950 after he noticed friends being drafted at the start of the Korean War. He left for San Diego in March 1951, leaving behind his wife who was expecting their first child, Connie. During his time in the Navy, Seabourn created training brochures that included illustrations of how to evacuate, how to enter and exit a plane, as well as how to put on an inflatable life vest. He later became the art director for the Navy’s monthly magazine for two years before being transferred to Pearl Harbor. At Pearl Harbor, Seabourn was surrounded by artists, journalists, photographers, and writers, who were all shipmates in the Sincpack Fleet. The Sincpack Fleet completed work requests for various ships at sea. While in the Navy Bert’s art was also published in many magazines to which he submitted cartoons. He also completed his first full-time art project—painting the mess hall.

== Artistic style and notable works ==
Seabourn’s painting style evolved over the span of his education. Bert began with cartoon-style works at a young age and kept this style through his high school years. Until he began studying at Oklahoma City University, his works were naturalistic, that is, reflected observed reality. But at OCU, he was inspired by painter and instructor Roger White. After some time studying under White, Seabourn experimented with abstract painting. Abstract expressionism became the style for which Seabourn was to be known.

Along with the abstract aspect of Seabourn’s art, he is also known for Native American subject matter of his works. Seabourn was inspired to pursue American Indian subjects after a visit to the Indian Annual, a juried art show at Tulsa’s Philbrook Museum of Art, but he wanted to try a different approach than the Flatstyle art that was then popular.

Seabourn was an active part of the Native American art world until the passage of the Indian Arts and Crafts Act in 1990. As a person of Native American descent with no Certificate of Degree of Indian Blood to prove descent from any Cherokee tribe, it is illegal for Seabourn to publish claiming to be an Indian Artist.

One of Seabourn’s notable works is Wind Walker, a bronze sculpture that stands 23 feet tall and was unveiled in 1988.

== Awards ==
- 1976 - Master Artist designation by the Five Civilized Tribes Museum
- 1981- Governor’s Arts Award from the Oklahoma Arts Council
- 1997 - Honorary Doctor of Humane Letters
- 2009 - Paseo Arts Association Lifetime Achievement Award

== Personal ==
Seabourn lived with his wife, Bonnie, in Oklahoma City. The couple has three daughters: Connie, Angela, and Jimmie.

Seabourn died on November 17, 2022, aged 91.
