= Joan Heller Brown =

American pharmacologist

Joan Heller Brown is an American pharmacologist. She is Distinguished Professor and Chair of the Department of Pharmacology at UC San Diego School of Medicine. She is known for fundamental contributions to the understanding of G-protein coupled receptors (GPCRs) — molecules that span cell membranes, where they transmit messages between cells and their environments — and how GPCRs regulate cell growth and survival, in healthy and various disease states. Many therapeutic drugs work by influencing GPCRs, thus Heller Brown's discoveries have been crucial to their development.

== Education ==
Heller Brown earned a BA in neurobiology at Cornell University and PhD in pharmacology at Albert Einstein College of Medicine. She completed her postdoctoral training at the University of Colorado.

== Career and research ==
Heller Brown joined the faculty at UC San Diego School of Medicine in 1975. She became interim chair of the Department of Pharmacology in 2002 and was named full chair in 2005. Heller Brown served as Editor-in-Chief of the journal Molecular Pharmacology from 2000 to 2003 and has served on the editorial boards of numerous other scientific journals throughout her career.

Through her research, Heller Brown has made fundamental contributions to the understanding of GPCRs and the mechanisms by which molecules such as dopamine, acetylcholine, catecholamines, thrombin and lysophospolipids work with them to influence cell growth and survival. She is best known for discovering that stimulation of one particular GPCR, the muscarinic acetylcholine receptor, decreases production of cAMP, a crucial cell messaging molecule, in the heart. She also discovered that another type of GPCR, known as adrenergic receptors, regulates basic cell signaling functions in heart muscle cells (cardiomyocytes).

=== Awards and honors ===
Heller Brown received the Established Investigator Award from the American Heart Association (AHA) and has been appointed as Fellow of the AHA and the International Society for Heart Research. She was the 2017 recipient of the Otto Krayer Award in Pharmacology given by the American Society for Pharmacology and Experimental Therapeutics (ASPET).
