= Miss Indian America =

Pageant from 1953 to 1984 in Sheridan, Wyoming, US

Miss Indian America was a pageant from 1953 to 1989 that was part annual All-American Indian Days festival in Sheridan, Wyoming. Each contestant was assessed on the basis of her appearance, communication skills, knowledge and practice of her culture, knowledge of tribal, federal and state governments and talent in traditional and contemporary tribal skills.

The reigning Miss Indian American was considered to be a cultural ambassador between Native Americans and non-Native Americans through speaking engagements, public appearances, participation in conferences of federal, state, local and tribal governments.

In 2017, Montana: The Magazine of Western History published a full history of the pageant.

== Winners ==
Year	Winner	Nation
1989	Wanda Johnson	Navajo
1988	Bobette Kay Wildcat	Shoshone
1987	Linda Kay Lupe	White Mountain Apache
1986	Audra Arviso	Navajo
1985	Jorja Frances Oberly	Osage-Commanche-Nez Perce
1984	Anne-Louise Willie	White Mountain Apache-Paiute
1983	Debbie Secakuku	Hopi
1982	Vivian Juan	Tohono O'odham
1981	Jerilyn Lebeau	Cheyenne River Sioux
1980	Melanie Tallmadge	Winnebago-Minnesota Sioux
1978-9	Susan Arkeketa	Otoe-Missouria/Muscogee Creek
1977	Gracie Welch	Mohave-Chemehuevi-Yavapai
1976	Kristine Rayola Harvey	White Mountain Apache
1975	Deana Jo Harragarra	Otoe-Kiowa
1974	Claire Manning	Shoshone-Paiute
1973	Maxine Norris	Tohono O'odham
1972	Louise Edmo	Shoshone-Bannock
1971	Nora Begay	Navajo
1970	Virginia Stroud	Keetoowah Cherokee-Mvskoke
1969	Margery Haury	Cheyenne-Arapahoe-Navajo-Sioux
1968	Thomasine Hill	Crow-Pawnee
1967	Sarah Johnson	Navajo
1966	Wahleah Lujan	Taos Pueblo
1965	Marcelle Ahtone	Kiowa
1964	Michele Portwood	Arapaho
1963	Williamette Youpee	Sisseton-Yankton Dakota
1962	Ramona Soto	Klamath
1961	Brenda Bearchum	Northern Cheyenne
1960	Vivian Arviso	Navajo
1959	Delores Racine	Blackfeet
1958	Not held	
1957	Ruth Larson	Gros Ventre
1956	Sandra Gover	Skidi Pawnee
1955	Rita Ann McLaughlin	Hunkpapa Lakota
1954	Mary Louise Defender	Yanktonai Dakota
1953	Arlene Wesley	Yakama Nation
