= Gary Montgomery (artist) =

Native American artist

Gary Montgomery is a professional artist of Seminole descent who primarily works with oil paints. An artist since the 1970s, Montgomery has established a reputation as a skilled Native artist. His work has been included in many exhibitions at the Five Civilized Tribes Museum in Muskogee, Oklahoma and numerous galleries in Oklahoma City. The Gilcrease Museum acquired his painting “Grizzly Bear with Reflection in Water” in 2006.

Montgomery grew up outside of Seminole, Oklahoma and lived on a farm with his grandparents. While living with them he often played outside and with his horse, pastimes which would later influence his art. Montgomery attended Jones Academy boarding school in Hartshorne, Oklahoma where he learned English (his first language was Seminole).

In college, Montgomery split his time between art classes and sports. He attended Murray State College for a year and then transferred to Eastern Central University to play baseball.

Montgomery primarily works with oil paints. His style is realistic and he describes himself as a western artist. For a time, Montgomery struggled with alcoholism and spent some time in prison where he had the opportunity to focus on his art and hone his skills. In the 1980s, Montgomery opened an art studio in Shawnee, Oklahoma. He has continued to exhibit his work in Oklahoma art shows.
