= Cherokee Nation Foundation =

Organization serving the Cherokee Nation, Oklahoma, US

- Founded: 1998
- Founder: Shelley Butller-Allen
- Location(s): Tahlequah, Cherokee Nation
- Region served: United States
- Method: Scholarships, programs

The Cherokee Nation Foundation is an organization serving the Cherokee Nation, a federally recognized tribe of more than 300,000 citizens. Its mission is to provide educational opportunities to Cherokee students so that they can reach their full potential. The Cherokee Nation Foundation is a tax-exempt charitable organization under Section 501(c)(3) of the Internal Revenue Code.

== Board of directors ==
The Board of Directors serve a four-year term and are appointed by the Principal Chief of the Cherokee Nation.

Susan Chapman Plumb - CEO of Bank of Cherokee County

Tonya Rozell

LeRoy Qualls

Patsi Nixon Smith

Amber George

== Activities ==
The Cherokee Nation Foundation provides educational opportunities to Cherokee students so that they can reach their full potential. Programs begin for students as early as elementary school and continue to support students throughout their efforts in higher education.

CNF provides Junior Achievement programming to Cherokee Nation's 14 counties, as well as ACT prep and college readiness courses. They also offer scholarship opportunities and have endowment funds established at Northeastern State University, Oklahoma State University and University of Tulsa.

== Executive Directors ==
Janice Carlile Randall
