= Jean Bales =

American painter

Jean Bales (1946–2003) was an Iowa Native American painter, printmaker, and historian from Oklahoma.

== Early life and education ==
A member of the Iowa Tribe of Oklahoma, Jean Elaine Myers Bales was born on December 25, 1946, in Pawnee, Oklahoma, to Lydia May (née Lincoln) and Tildow J. Myers. She has a brother Billy Jack Myers. She was educated at Chickasha High School. In 1967, she received her bachelor's degree in fine arts from the Oklahoma College of Liberal Arts. She also traveled to Mexico to attend the Institute of San Miguel Allende.

== Career ==
Bales taught crafts at a school in Fort Sill run by the Bureau of Indian Affairs, also taking up a history course when its teacher resigned. This led her to a renewed interest in her heritage, and after a year she resigned to become a full-time artist. Bales signed her work "J. Bales" early in her career so as to hide her gender. She also served as the official historian of the Iowa Tribe, and won more than one hundred awards for her work. Many of her paintings depict historical and cultural scenes in the lives of Iowa women; examples can be found in numerous public and private collections.

== Death ==
Bales died on December 8, 2003, in Carney, Oklahoma.
