= Virginia Stroud =

Native American painter from Oklahoma (1951–2024)

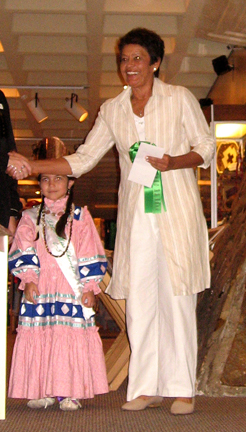
- Stroud in 2007
- Born: March 13, 1951; Madera, California, U.S.
- Died: November 8, 2024 (aged 73); Tahlequah, Oklahoma, U.S.
- Citizenship: United Keetoowah Band of Cherokee Indians and American
- Education: Muskogee High School, Bacone College, University of Oklahoma
- Known for: Painting (tempera and gouache), illustration, printmaking
- Awards: Miss Cherokee Tribal Princess (1969), Miss National Congress of American Indians (1970), Miss Indian America (1971); Indian Arts and Crafts Association Artist of the Year, 1982; Five Civilized Tribes Museum Master Artist, 1986; Cherokee Medal of Honor, 2000

Virginia Alice Stroud (March 13, 1951 – November 8, 2024) was a Native American painter from Oklahoma. She was an enrolled citizen of the United Keetoowah Band of Cherokee Indians and a Muscogee descendant.

== Early life ==
Virginia Stroud was born in Madera, California, on March 13, 1951. Her mother died when she was eleven, so Stroud moved to Muskogee, Oklahoma, to live with her sister. She sold her first painting at the age of 13.

Stroud graduated from Muskogee High School in 1968. From 1968 to 1970, she attended Bacone College and studied art under Cheyenne painter Dick West, who made her his studio assistant. She then attended the University of Oklahoma.

In her late 20s, Stroud was adopted, following Kiowa tradition, as a daughter of Evelyn Tahome and Jacob Ahtone, a Kiowa couple.

== Pageants and the Tear Dress ==
In 1969, Stroud served as Miss Cherokee Tribal Princess. She went on to win the title Miss National Congress of American Indians in 1970, and in 1971, she was crowned Miss Indian America XVII. When Stroud competed for the title of princess in 1969, Cherokee women wanted her to represent the tribe in a "traditional" Cherokee outfit, which was problematic since Cherokee women wore contemporary mainstream fashions for at least two centuries and wore very little clothing before that. A committee of Cherokee women, appointed by Chief W. W. Keeler designed a dress based on a hundred-year-old Cherokee dress owned by a Cherokee lady, Wynona Day, and from surrounding Southeast tribes' formal regalia, and they created the "Tear Dress." Elizabeth Higgins (Cherokee Nation) sewed the first tear dress for Stroud.

== Art career ==
Stroud painted with tempera and gouache and was a fine art printmaker. She also has written and illustrated several children's books. She drew inspiration from Bacone school Flatstyle painting and historical ledger art, as well as ancient pictographs. Over her career, Stroud developed a narrative style with minimal facial details in her people and lavish floral backgrounds. She also painted kinetic wooden sculptures and fine art furniture.

Her work is in such public collections as the Gilcrease Museum, Millicent Rogers Museum, Philbrook Museum of Art, Fred Jones Jr. Museum of Art, Cherokee Heritage Center, and Cherokee Nation Entertainment.

Of her work, Stroud said: "I paint for my people. Art is a way for our culture to survive... perhaps the only way."

== Death ==
Stroud died in Tahlequah, Oklahoma, on November 8, 2024, at the age of 73.

== Honors ==
In 1970, Stroud became the youngest Native artist to win first place in the Woodlands division of the Philbrook Museum's annual juried art show. In 1982, the Indian Arts and Crafts Association honored Stroud as Artist of the Year. The Five Civilized Tribes Museum declared Stroud a Master Artist in 1986. In 2000, she was given the Cherokee Medal of Honor.

== Published works ==
- Doesn't Fall off His Horse: A Cherokee Tale. Dial, 1994. ISBN 978-0-8037-1635-3.
- A Walk to the Great Mystery: A Cherokee Tale. Dial, 1995. ISBN 978-0-8037-1636-0.
- The Path of the Quiet Elk: A Native American Alphabet Book. Dial, 1996. ISBN 978-0-8037-1718-3.

== See also ==
- Sharron Ahtone Harjo (Kiowa)
