= Sharron Ahtone Harjo =

Kiowa painter

- Sain-Tah-Oodie
- Born: Marcelle Sharron Ahtone; January 6, 1945; Carnegie, Oklahoma, US
- Citizenship: Kiowa Tribe of Oklahoma and United States
- Education: Bacone College
- Known for: painting, ledger art
- Movement: ledger art, Bacone school
- Elected: Miss Indian America (1968)

Marcelle Sharron Ahtone Harjo (born 1945) is a Kiowa painter from Oklahoma. Her Kiowa name, Sain-Tah-Oodie, translates to "Killed With a Blunted Arrow." In the 1960s and 1970s, she and sister Virginia Stroud were instrumental in the revival of ledger art, a Plains Indian narrative pictorial style on paper or muslin.

== Background ==
Sharron Ahtone Harjo's parents were Evelyn Tahome (Dáu:tsáihè:bà) and Jacob Ahtone. Evelyn's parents were A. Jane Goombi (Étóm) and Stephen "Tahome" Poolant (Ésàyó:). Jacob served as Kiowa Tribal chairman from 1978 to 1980. Jacob's parents were Tahdo (Tágáut) and Samuel Ahtone (Á:tòñ:). Samuel attended the Hampton Institute in Virginia and the Carlisle Indian Industrial School in Pennsylvania. Samuel was a ledger artist.

Her great-grandmother, Millie Durgan or Sé:hèñ:d̶òhól, was taken captive by the Kiowas as a young girl. Durgan acculturated into Kiowa society and became a renowned cradleboard-maker.

In 1963, Ahtone Harjo graduated from Billings West High School in Billings, Montana. She studied art under Southern Cheyenne artist Dick West at Bacone College in Muskogee, Oklahoma, from 1963 to 1965. In 1965, she earned her AA from Bacone and earned her BA from Northeastern State University in Tahlequah, Oklahoma.

In 1965, Ahtone Harjo was chosen as Miss Indian America.

== Art career ==
Sharron Ahtone Harjo paints in acrylic, oil, gouache, and watercolor. Her early work used rock art and Plains hide painting as influences before she began to work in the ledger art style. In the 1970s, Ahtone began showing her work professionally. Due to the lack of acceptance for women artists in her area and nationally, she exhibited under the name Ahtone Harjo. She later taught art in schools.

Ahtone Harjo views Kiowa Sun Dance as one of her most important works because of her use of primary sources such as calendars, ledger drawings, and interviews with community members to complete the work. This painting is one of the only historical records of the annual ceremonial Sun Dance in which the entire tribe participated. The dance has not been performed since 1887. The painting took her several years to complete.

== Personal ==
Ahtone Harjo primarily lives in Oklahoma City, Oklahoma, although she also stays in Santa Fe, New Mexico, and is from the Zoltone District 2 of the Kiowa tribal nation. Her sister is Deborah Ahtone, a Kiowa visual artist and writer. Sharron is married to Amos Harjo (Seminole/Muscogee). Their daughter Tahnee Ahtoneharjo-Growingthunder is a beadwork and textile artist, and curator.

== Public collections ==
Sharron Ahtone Harjo's work can be found in the following public collections.

- Brown University
- Center of the American Indian, Kilpatrick Center
- Center for Great Plains Studies, University of Nebraska–Lincoln
- Haffenreffer Museum of Anthropology
- Oklahoma State Historical Society
- Southern Plains Indian Museum

== Art works ==
- Return Them Safely to Home (1971)
- Woman on Red (1976)
- Kiowa Sun Dance (1981)
- One Daughter of the Earth (1985)
- Looking for Kiowas (1985)
- Last Will and Testament (2005)

== Published works ==
- Hail, Barbara, Everett R. Rhoades, and Sharron Ahtone-Harjo. Gifts of Pride and Love: Kiowa and Comanche Cradles. Norman: University of Oklahoma Press, 2001. ISBN 978-080613604-2.
- Pearce, Richard, Sharron Ahtone-Harjo. Women and Ledger Art: Four Contemporary Native American Artists. University of Arizona Press, Jun 13, 2013 ISBN 0816521042
