= Iowa Tribe of Oklahoma =

One of two federally recognized tribes for the Iowa people

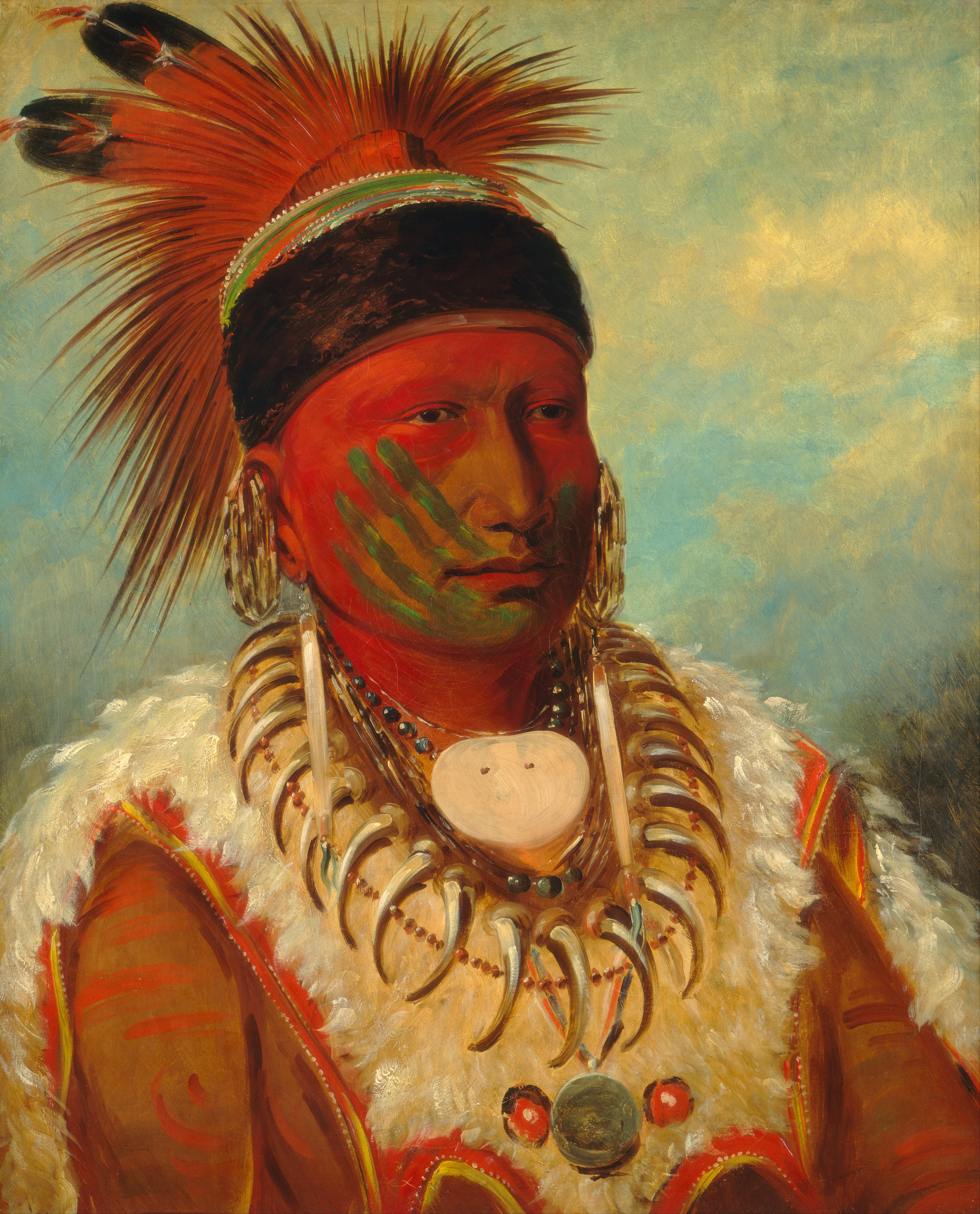
- The White Cloud, Head Chief of the Iowas, painting by George Catlin

Total population
- 800

Regions with significant populations
- United States (Oklahoma)

Languages
- Chiwere language, English

Religion
- traditional tribal religion, Native American Church, Christianity

Related ethnic groups
- Iowa, Otoe, Missouria and Ho-Chunk

The Iowa Tribe of Oklahoma is one of two federally recognized tribes for the Iowa people. The other is the Iowa Tribe of Kansas and Nebraska. Traditionally Iowas spoke the Chiwere language, part of the Siouan-Catawban language family. Their own name for their tribe is Báxoje, meaning, "grey snow," a term inspired by the tribe's traditional winter lodges covered with snow, stained grey from hearth fires.

Since 1985, the tribe has held an annual powwow. It takes place in mid-June four miles (6 km) south of Perkins, Oklahoma, on Highway 177.

== Government ==
Map of Iowa Tribe of Oklahoma's tribal jurisdictional area (OTSA) and nearby jurisdiction areas.

The Iowa Tribe of Oklahoma is headquartered in Perkins, Oklahoma, and their tribal jurisdictional area is in Lincoln, Logan, Oklahoma, and Payne counties, Oklahoma. Of the 800 enrolled tribal members, over 490 live within the state of Oklahoma. Edgar Kent is the current tribal chairperson.

== Programs and economic development ==
The tribe issues its own vehicle tags and operates the Bah-kho-je Housing Authority. They own a truck stop, a gas station, a smoke shop, a bingo hall, an off-track wagering facility, and a casino. The estimated annual economic impact of the Iowa Tribe of Oklahoma was $10,343,000 in 2011. The tribe operates the Cimarron Casino in Perkins, the Iowa Tribe Smokeshop in Coyle, and the Ioway Casino Resort in Chandler.

The Bah-Kho-Je Journal is a newspaper published by the tribe for enrolled members. The tribe also owns BKH Solutions, a SBA 8(A) certified company providing trucking, construction, environmental, archaeological, and energy services and consulting. They have their own tribal police department and Tah-Je Do-Weh Che Child Development and Head Start program.

The tribe owns its own Bah-Kho-Je Gallery that represents Iowa artists, such as Jean Bales (Iowa), David Kaskaske (Iowa-Otoe-Missouri), and Daniel Murray (Iowa/Otoe), as well as artists from related tribes, such as Mars Biggoose (Ponca), Gina Gray (Osage Nation), and others. The gallery was based in Guthrie, Oklahoma, but is now located in the Iowa tribal complex in Perkins.

== Language ==
An estimated thirty tribal members still speak the Iowa or Chiwere language. The tribe has offered language classes in the past and is currently providing elders with recording devices to archive language material they feel important to share with the younger generations.

== History ==
The Iowa, or Ioway, originated in the Great Lakes region. They are thought, along with the Ho-Chunk, Otoe, and Missouria tribes, to have once been a single tribe. In the 16th century, the Iowa, Otoe, and Missouria broke away from that tribe and moved to the south and west. The first recorded contact between the Iowa and Europeans was in 1676, in Green Bay, Wisconsin, where they lived among the Ho-Chunk people.

Traditionally, Iowa society was divided into two moieties, the Buffalo and the Bear clans, who would govern the tribe on an alternating, semiannual basis.

In face of European-American encroachment, the Iowa moved east in what is now Iowa and Missouri, but in 1839 the tribe ceded their lands and moved to the Ioway Reservation on the Kansas-Nebraska border. There factionalism broke out between the mixed blood and full blood Iowas. The mixed bloods advocated assimilation, while the full bloods wanted to follow their traditional way of life.

In the attempt to preserve their traditions, the full blood faction of the Iowa Tribe began moving into Indian Territory in 1878. They were given lands within the Sac and Fox Reservation in 1883. Their collective tribal landholdings were broken up by the Dawes Act and, in 1890, individual land was allotted by the Cherokee Commission to 109 tribal members.

The Curtis Act of 1898 dismantled tribal government, but the tribe was able to reorganize under the Oklahoma Indian Welfare Act of 1936, as the Iowa Tribe of Oklahoma. They ratified a constitution and by-laws in 1937.

== Bah Kho-Je Xla Chi: Eagle Rehabilitation Program ==
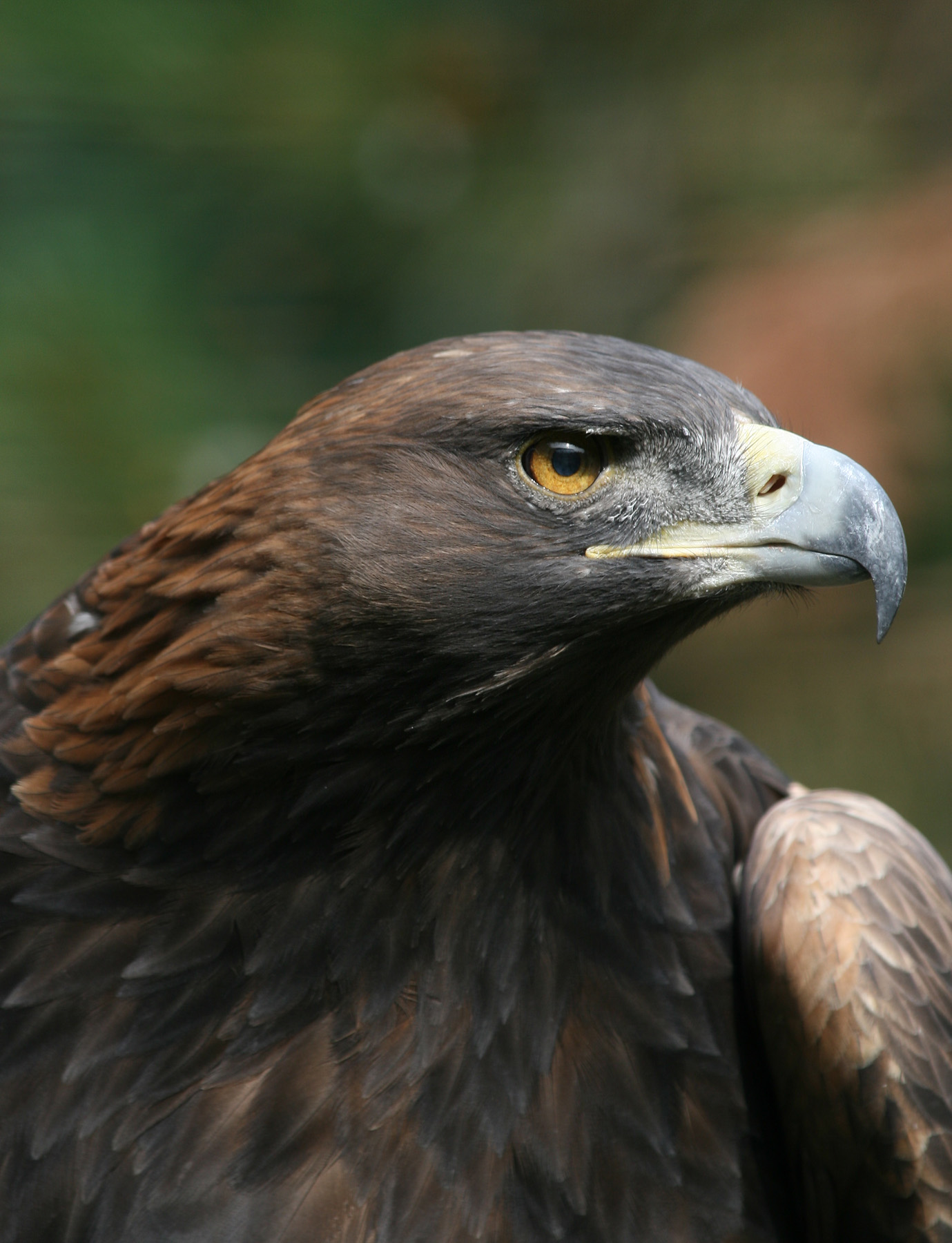
Golden eagle, Aquila chrysaetos

A unique tribal service is the Bah Kho-Je Xla Chi or Grey Snow Eagle House. This eagle aviary was built in January 2006, within the tribe's buffalo preserve. Bah Kho-Je Xla Chi serves both to rehabilitate injured eagles and to house eagles that cannot be released back in the wild. The program works with golden eagles and bald eagles. Located in Perkins, this is the first facility that can house injured eagles in the state of Oklahoma and meets US Fish and Wildlife Service standards.

The aviary is one of the few in the country is open to the public, and visitors have come from all over the world, including tribal elders from many different Oklahoman Indian tribes. Naturally molted eagle feathers are gathered by the tribe for legally permitted religious use. Victor Roubidoux, an Iowa tribal member, serves as the aviary manager. The tribe is currently raising funds to expand the aviary, since spaces for eagles filled up almost immediately with birds from throughout the United States. The tribe recently added a new flight cage. Says Roubidoux, "We believe that the eagle is the only animal that has seen the face of the creator and so we honor him with respect and dignity."

== Notable tribal members ==
- Jean Bales (1946–2004), artist
