= Joan Hill =

Native American artist (1930–2020)

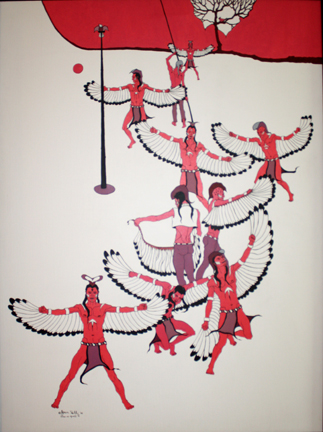
- Acrylic painting depicting an Eagle Dance, Joan Hill, 2006
- Born: Che-se-quah; December 19, 1930; Muskogee, Oklahoma, United States
- Died: June 16, 2020 (aged 89); Muskogee, Oklahoma
- Citizenship: Muscogee (Creek) Nation
- Education: BA Northeastern State University; Bacone College
- Known for: Painting
- Movement: Bacone school, Nonobjective abstraction
- Awards: Smithsonian Institution's People of the Century.
- Patrons: US Department of the Interior

Joan Hill (December 19, 1930 – June 16, 2020), also known as Che-se-quah, was a Muscogee Creek artist of Cherokee ancestry. She was one of the most awarded Native American women artists in the 20th century.

== Personal ==
Joan Hill was born in Muskogee, Oklahoma, on December 19, 1930, the daughter of William M. and Winnie Harris Hill.

She descended from both Muscogee Creek and Cherokee chiefs. She chose the name Cheh-se-quah, Muscogee for "Redbird," for both her great-grandfather, Redbird Harris, and her maternal grandfather. Redbird Harris was Cherokee and is listed on the Dawes Rolls.

Hill lived on the site of the old Confederate Fort Davis, located on the south bank of the Arkansas River two and one-half miles northeast of present Muskogee, with her family. Her studio was adjacent to a Pre-Columbian Indian mound dating from 1200 CE.

== Art career ==
Hill attended Bacone College. In 1952, she received her BA degree in education from Northeastern State University of Tahlequah, Oklahoma, in 1952. In 1953, Hill took the Famous Artists Course. She was a public art teacher for four years before becoming a full-time artist.

She received more than 290 awards from countries including Great Britain and Italy. Other honors include over 20 Grand Awards, and the Waite Phillips Artist Trophy. In addition, Hill was the winner of a prestigious mural competition at the Daybreak Star Performing Arts Center from the Seattle Arts Commission in Washington. In 1974 Hill was given the title "Master Artist" by the Five Civilized Tribes Museum in Muskogee.

Over 110 of her works are in permanent collections, including the Sequoyah National Research Center in Little Rock, Arkansas, the United States Department of the Interior Museums of the Indian Arts and Crafts Board, Washington, D.C., and the Smithsonian Museum of the American Indian, New York City. State appointments include to the Governor's Commission on the Status of Women by Governor Henry Bellmon, 1989. National Appointments include U.S. Commissioner to the Indian Arts and Crafts Board, Washington D.C., by the U.S. Secretary of the Interior–2000. In 2000, Hill was the "Honored One" of the Red Earth festival in Oklahoma City, Oklahoma.

== Artwork ==
Hill is known most for her stylized, acrylic paintings of historical and cultural scenes, employed a limited palette of neutrals, oranges, reds, and purples. Painting with watercolors, she let negative space define foliage, mounds, or other landscape features. "Each element of her paintings is purposeful," writes author Susan C. Power. She predominantly painted Muscogee and Cherokee women and frequently painted nude figures. Hill also explored nonobjective abstraction.

Via Gambaro Gallery, which was launched by Retha Walden Gambaro and Stephen Gambaro to spotlight contemporary Native American artists, included Hill's work in its 1980 National American Indian Women's Art Show.

Hill said in 1991, "Art widens the scope of the inner and outer senses and enriches life by giving us a greater awareness of the world."

In 2018 through 2020, her painting was exhibited in the exhibition Hearts of Our People: Native Women Artists at the Smithsonian American Art Museum.

== Death ==
Hill died on June 16, 2020.

== See also ==
- List of Native American artists
- Visual arts by indigenous peoples of the Americas
