= Five Civilized Tribes Museum =

Museum in Oklahoma

Coordinates: 35°45′50″N 95°24′52″W

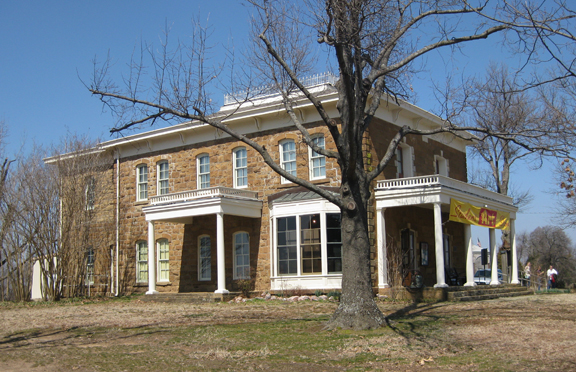
The Five Civilized Tribes Museum

The Five Civilized Tribes Museum in Muskogee, Oklahoma, showcases the art, history, and culture of the "Five Civilized Tribes": the Cherokee, Chickasaw, Choctaw, Muscogee (Creek), and Seminole tribes. Housed in the historic Union Indian Agency building, the museum opened in 1966.

The museum holds an extensive collection of Native American art of the Five Civilized Tribes, including a large collection of originals by Jerome Tiger (Muscogee/Seminole, 1941–1967).

== History ==
The museum originated with the Da-Co-Tah Indian Club, which began campaigning in September 1951 to use the Union Indian Agency building to house a local museum. In 1954, the club sponsored legislation, H.R. Bill No. 8983 by U.S. Representative Ed Edmondson, that petitioned the return of the building to the municipal government of Muskogee, Oklahoma.

The legislation was passed and signed by Dwight D. Eisenhower and the museum was incorporated on November 19, 1955. Two years later, Marie L. Wadley (Shawnee/Cherokee) became the first president of the museum. The building opened its doors as the Five Civilized Tribes Museum on April 26, 1966. In 2016, Sean Barney succeeded Mary Robinson as the 7th Executive Director.

=== Union Indian Agency Building ===
The Union Indian Agency Building is listed in the National Register of Historic Places (NR 70000535) and was constructed by the Bureau of Indian Affairs in the 1870s to house the Superintendent of the Five Civilized Tribes. Until this point, each tribe had their own agency, except for the Chickasaws and Choctaws, who shared one at Boggy Depot.

The term, "Five Civilized Tribes", was coined around the same time as the opening of the consolidated agency building. The building was used for the offices and residence of the Indian Agency Superintendent and his family.

The building was owned by the Muscogee (Creek) Nation and served as a school and orphanage for the Creek Freedmen. In 1909, the ownership of the building was transferred to the municipal government of Muskogee, Oklahoma. The city passed ownership to the United States government in 1944 to aid the Veterans Hospital facilities, but it was left unused. After World War I it began a new life as “The Chateau” where area residents came to listen and dance to live bands. After World War II, the building fell into disrepair until the city and Da-Co-Tah Indian Club worked to repair and restore the building.

== Exhibits ==
On April 16, 1966, the Da-Co-Tah Indian Club opened the doors to the Five Civilized Tribes Museum. The funds used for the restoration of the Old Agency Building had been raised from individual donors, without any federal, state or municipal aid. Since then, the Museum has been following the goals set forth by the club.

The museum helps share the art, culture, and history of the Five Tribes with tours. Exhibitions featuring various aspects of their lives, history and culture are displayed downstairs, and are changed quite frequently. Upstairs one can find many artifacts mixed in with art from either the current competition, or from the Museum's permanent collection.

The museum holds an extensive collection of art produced by Cherokee, Chickasaw, Choctaw, Muscogee, and Seminole artists, such as Fred Beaver, Johnny Tiger, Joan Hill, and many others. It has the world's largest collection of Jerome Tiger originals, including “Stickballer”, his only major sculpture, which is on permanent display in the gallery.

== Da-Co-Tah Indian Club ==
The goal of the Da-Co-Tah Indian Club was stated in their Bylaws. “The object of this organization shall be to bring members of the various Indian tribes into closer communications for acquaintance, mutual helpfulness, inter-tribal social activities, and to promote awareness of tribal history and accomplishments throughout the greater community area. The club shall be non-sectarian and non-political”.

Those founding women, all of Native American ancestry, chose the name “Da-co-tah” for their club, taken from the Dakota language, because it means “Circle of Friends.” They met the second and fourth Tuesday of every month. Red and gold were chosen for the club colors, being they were the symbols of friendship, of steadfast ideals and of ambition for the future. In 1930, the Da-Co-Tah Indian Club was federated.

To those pioneer Indians whose courage and fortitude, perseverance and achievement sustained them through travail and disaster and earned for them the name of The Five Civilized Tribes, and who laid the foundation for the State of Oklahoma. - These words by Grant Foreman were printed at the beginning of a letter postmarked April 15, 1966, which was sent out in preparation for the opening of the Five Civilized Tribes Museum.

They participated in many charitable acts, such as donating canned foods, clothes and shoes to the Murrow Orphanage, as well as making sure they were taken to barber shops for their haircuts. They also took the children to attend the Free State Fair once a year and to go see movies, as well as many other activities. The Club raised funds to provide charitable services to poor Indian families, and to make donations to the Salvation Army. They raise money for the Drought Relief Fund and the Unemployment Fund.

=== Events ===
Each year competitions are held where tribal members can compete in painting, pottery, gourd art, sculpture, and more. The student art show is also held each year, where students with descent from one of the Five Tribes, who are in grades seventh through twelfth, are allowed to compete.

Every April, the museum is host to Art Under The Oaks, an art market held on the grounds during the weekend. This gives visitors a chance to buy directly from the vendors, all members of one of the five tribes, as well as see traditional singing and dancing. November hosts the Master's Show featuring works of Five Tribes Master Artists.

=== Publications ===
In 1984, the Museum published a cookbook of recipes submitted by Native Americans and others entitled Pow Wow Chow. Decades later, Senator Elizabeth Warren's submission of six recipes, and falsely signing herself "Elizabeth Warren - Cherokee," became a matter of controversy during political campaigns.
