= T. C. Cannon =

Native American painter and printmaker (1946–1978)

- Self Portrait in the Studio, 1975, oil painting, 72 × 52 in., private collection
- Born: Tommy Wayne Cannon; September 27, 1946; Lawton, Oklahoma
- Died: May 8, 1978 (aged 31); Santa Fe, New Mexico
- Citizenship: Kiowa Indian Tribe of Oklahoma and U.S.
- Education: Institute of American Indian Arts; San Francisco Art Institute; Central State University
- Known for: painting, printmaking
- Movement: Native American art

Tommy Wayne Cannon (Kiowa/Caddo, September 27, 1946 – May 8, 1978) was an important Native American artist of the 20th century. He was popularly known as T. C. Cannon. He was an enrolled member of the Kiowa Indian Tribe of Oklahoma and had Caddo and French ancestry.

== Early life ==
Cannon grew up in Zodaltone and Gracemont, Oklahoma. His parents were Walter Cannon (Kiowa) and Minnie Ahdunko Cannon (Caddo). His Kiowa name, Pai-doung-a-day, means "One Who Stands in the Sun." He learned about the art of the Kiowa Six, a group of Native American painters who achieved international reputations in the fine art world and who helped to develop the Southern Plains Flatstyle of painting. Stephen Mopope and Lee Tsatoke Sr., grandson of Monroe Tsatoke, particularly influenced the young artist.

T. C. Cannon enrolled in the Institute of American Indian Arts (IAIA) in Santa Fe in 1964, where he studied painting with Fritz Scholder (Luiseño). He created works that brings recognition to the late 20th century native artists.

After graduating from IAIA, he enrolled in the San Francisco Art Institute but left after two months and enlisted in the army.

As a paratrooper in the 101st Airborne Division, Cannon served in Vietnam from 1967 to 1968. During the Tet Offensive, he earned two Bronze Star Medals. He was also inducted into the Black Leggings Society, one of the Kiowa warriors' societies.

== Art career ==
While still stationed in Vietnam, Cannon had a breakthrough in his art career. Rosemary Ellison, curator of the Southern Plains Indian Museum in Anadarko, Oklahoma, included him in a major traveling exhibition Contemporary Southern Plains Indian Painting (1972).

In 1972, Cannon and fellow artist Fritz Scholder (Luiseño) had a two-man exhibition at the Smithsonian Institution's National Collection of Fine Arts, titled Two American Painters. In this exhibition, according to Janet Berlo and Ruth Phillips, Cannon and Scholder subverted visual stereotypes about Native Americans, creating an exploration "in irony and kitsch" which "opened up a new phase of contemporary art".

Cannon produced a large body of work over the next six years, in preparation for his one-man show, scheduled to open at the Aberbach Gallery in New York in October 1978. On May 8 of that year, he died in an automobile accident. After a delay, the show opened on December 10, 1979, as T.C. Cannon: A Memorial Exhibition. Featuring 50 works by Cannon, the show travelled to such locations as the Heard Museum, the New Mexico Museum of Art, and the Buffalo Bill Historical Center.

As an artist, he uses striking colors and elements deriving from native-non native backgrounds.

== Commissions ==
Cannon painted murals at the United Indians of All Tribes Foundation and the Daybreak Star Cultural Center in Seattle, Washington, and the Santa Fe Opera Guild.

== Honors ==
Cannon was an artist-in-residence at Dartmouth College in Hanover, New Hampshire; Colorado State University in Fort Collins, Colorado; and the United States National Park Service. In 1988 he was posthumously inducted into the National Hall of Fame for Famous American Indians in Anadarko.

== Death ==
Tommy Wayne Cannon died in an automobile accident southeast of Santa Fe on May 8, 1978.
