= Susie Peters =

- Born: Charlotte Susan Ryan; November 1, 1873; Huntsville, Tennessee, US
- Died: October 14, 1965 (aged 91); Anadarko, Oklahoma, US
- Other names: Susan Ryan Peters, Susie Swain, Susan Peters, Susie Schaffer, Susan Charlotte Peters, Susie C. Peters
- Occupations: Indian agent and art preservationist
- Years active: 1891-1965
- Known for: discovering the Kiowa Six

Susie Peters (Kiowa name: Kom-tah-gya) was an American preservationist and matron at the Anadarko Agency, who worked to promote Kiowa artists. Born to white parents in Tennessee, she moved to Indian Territory with her family prior to Oklahoma becoming a state. While working as a matron for the Indian Agency, she discovered the talent of the young artists who would become known as the Kiowa Six and introduced them to Oscar Jacobson, director of the University of Oklahoma's art department. She was honored by the National Hall of Fame for Famous American Indians and both adopted by the tribe and given a Kiowa name in 1954. In 1963, the Anadarko Philomathic Club created an annual art award in her name. She was inducted into the Oklahoma Women's Hall of Fame in its inaugural year, 1982.

== Early life ==
Charlotte Susan Ryan was born on 1 November 1873 in Huntsville, Tennessee to Martha (née Davis) and Thomas Granville Ryan. As a child, she moved with her family to the Chickasaw Nation in the area which would become Grady County, Oklahoma.

She married U.S. Deputy Marshal John Swain, on April 15, 1891, in Alex, Indian Territory. The couple moved to Purcell, Indian Territory, where she worked as a school teacher. Swain was killed in a shootout over a land dispute on January 9, 1895, near Purcell and a life-sized tribute to him was erected in the Purcell Cemetery by his wife. (Note: In the early 1920s, Peters loaned the statue to the Oklahoma Historical Society. In 1959, her request to have it returned was denied.)

On July 20, 1897, in Guthrie, Oklahoma Territory, Swain was issued a license to marry James W. "Jim" Peters, but no marriage record was returned. A second license to marry Peters was issued on October 23, 1901, and the ceremony was performed the following day in Oklahoma City, Oklahoma Territory. (Note: Bork states that Susan Ryan Swain married Peters twice, having divorced him and remarried him.) Peters was accidentally shot by the Ardmore, Indian Territory police chief, Buck Garrett, on March 15, 1906, while the two men were at an informal gathering. Peters died the following day and was buried in his hometown of Newton, Kansas.

For a brief time, Peters managed the Monarch Hotel, located at 200 E. 2nd Street in Oklahoma City.

On June 29, 1911, she married Oscar L. Shaffer in Oklahoma City, but he was also murdered.

== Civil service career ==
When she was widowed a third time, Peters went to live as among the Kiowa in Caddo County and was hired as a field matron by the U.S. Indian Service for the Anadarko Agency. Peters identified several students at St. Patrick's Mission School with artistic talent and encouraged them to draw images representing their culture. She bought painting supplies and held informal art classes in her home from around 1918. To encourage the students, which included Spencer Asah, James Auchiah, Jack Hokeah, Stephen Mopope, and Monroe Tsatoke, Peters arranged for Mrs. Willie Baze Lane, an artist from Chickasha, Oklahoma, to give them art lessons and attempted to market their work. She contacted Ponca City philanthropist and millionaire Lew Wentz to help secure an education for the students. By 1923, she negotiated with the University of Oklahoma to help further the artists' training and in 1926, Peters had convinced Oscar Jacobson to provide them with special courses under the direction of Edith Mahier. Asah, Hokeah, Mopope, and Tsatoke were admitted as special students and joined a short time later by Auchiah and Lois Smokey. They would become known as the Kiowa Six and gained international recognition for their works.

She also was instrumental in mentoring Woody Crumbo, Potawatomi artist, whom she met during his youth while he was attending the Chilocco Indian School. In 1932, Peters arranged the sale of 22 of Crumbo's painting to the San Francisco Museum of Modern Art, setting his career in motion. Peters continued to encourage Kiowa youth to preserve their heritage annually accompanying Kiowa dancers to programs, such as the Gallup Inter-Tribal Ceremonial, from the 1930s into the 1960s. Peters worked with Laura Pedrick, niece of Chief Lone Wolf and Satank, to collect folklore and memorabilia of the Kiowa Tribe. She served as matron of the tribe until her death on October 14, 1965, in Anadarko. She was buried in the Purcell Cemetery beside her first husband.

== Awards and legacy ==
In a ceremony held on November 12, 1954, Peters was adopted into the Kiowa tribe and given the Kiowa name Kom-tah-gya. That same year, she was honored by the National Hall of Fame for Famous American Indians, when the Susan Peters Gallery was established in Anadarko. She was also honored by the Anadarko Philomathic Club, which created an annual art scholarship award in her name in 1963. The archive which she and Pedrick created, known as the Susie Peters Collection, is housed at the Oklahoma Historical Society and played an important role as source material for the four-volume, two-book work, Kiowa Voices by Maurice Boyd (Texas Christian University Press, 1983). Peters was one of the women inducted into the Oklahoma Women's Hall of Fame in their inaugural year, 1982 and was one of the subjects of a play, "Jacobson and the Kiowa Five", written by Russ Tall Chief (Osage) as part of the Native American New Play Festival for the Oklahoma City Theater Company.
