= Vanessa Jennings =

Native American Kiowa textile and beadwork artist

Vanessa Paukeigope Jennings
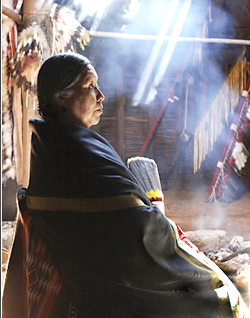
- Jennings in her earth lodge, 1989
- Born: Vanessa Paukeigope Santos; October 5, 1952 (age 73); Gila River Indian Community, Arizona, U.S.
- Known for: Beadwork, cradleboards, clothing, regalia, dolls
- Style: Southern Plains
- Spouse(s): Carl Jennings (2nd husband, 1993–present)
- Awards: National Heritage Fellowship (1989)

Vanessa Paukeigope Santos Jennings (born October 5, 1952) is a Ǥáuigú/Ná'ishą Apache/Gila River Pima regalia maker, clothing designer, cradleboard maker, and beadwork artist from Oklahoma.

== Early life ==
Jennings was born in the Gila River Indian Community near Tempe, Arizona but was raised in Oklahoma. Her parents were Clifford Santos of the Gila River Pima tribe and LaQuinta Mopope, a Kiowa who worked as a nurse with the Indian Health Service in Arizona. Jennings is the oldest granddaughter of Kiowa Six artist Stephen Mopope and Jeanette Berry Mopope, from whom Jennings "inherited the Kiowa songs, crafts, manners and language" that is integral to her artwork. Jennings began doing beadwork at age 11, after observing and helping her grandmother with her artistry for several years prior.

As a child growing up in Lawton, Oklahoma, she was often teased by others for wearing leggings and braids instead of trying to conceal her Native American heritage.

She attended high school and college in Oklahoma. After graduation, she worked with the Bureau of Indian Affairs and then moved to the allotment land granted to her grandmother in Red Stone, Oklahoma. She and her first husband built an earth lodge on this Kiowa spiritually-significant property, which she uses as a studio and also makes available to the tribe for various cultural activities.

In addition to her grandmother, another major influence in Jennings' life has been her participation in the O-Ho-Mah Lodge Society, a Kiowa war dance society with which her family has been involved for several generations. Her grandfather Stephen, his father George Mopope, and Jennings' sons Gabriel and Seth have all performed songs at Society ceremonies.

== Career ==
Jennings had made artwork in her spare time, but in the early 1980s she received a commission from the Museum of International Folk Art to make a ceremonial child's dress using traditional Kiowa beadwork on rawhide. Jennings acknowledges that this commission marked the beginning of her professional career as a traditional Southern Plains artist.

Jennings is known for making traditional Kiowa cradleboards, saddles, moccasins, beadwork, men's and women's clothing, and other craft formats, but she says cradleboards are her favorite. Over the years, her work has been included in many special exhibitions and she has received commissions from Kiowa leaders to make ceremonial regalia for important rituals, but she has also had to work other jobs in Anadarko, Oklahoma in order to earn funds to support her artwork.

Jennings has also taken seriously the responsibility of teaching her craft to future generations, by "instructing young people in the necessary techniques to make regalia and demonstrating her artistry for broader audiences at museums and cultural centers".

Despite having won many awards for her creative endeavors, she says "I've never considered myself an artist. I have always told everyone that I'm a simple, traditional woman." "I do my grandmother's work," Jennings said. "I do my great-grandmother's work. This is what they used to do. They are the ones who should be honored." Besides finished pieces, she is one of the few artists who brain-tans her own hides.

In 1992, Jennings (then-Morgan) reproduced a small version of the "Tepee With Battle Pictures" for an exhibit at the National Cowboy & Western Heritage Museum in Oklahoma City. The original painted tepee was created in 1845 to commemorate the continued peace agreement between the Kiowa and Cheyenne tribes, and was presented as a gift to Little Bluff, the principal chief of the Kiowa. The tepee represented an object of great cultural significance and prestige, and has been reproduced several times over the years. Jennings is a great-great-great-granddaughter of Little Bluff II. For her reproduced model, Jennings drew upon family history to depict military deeds, but because Kiowa tradition is that only men can reproduce such images, Jennings taught her son Seth to draw the battle pictures on the tepee.

In 1995, Jennings helped organize an exhibit titled "Four Generations: Mopope, Palmer, Jennings, and Morgan" at the Red Earth Indian Center in Oklahoma City. The exhibit featured the work of eight Kiowa artisans from Jennings' family, starting with her grandfather Stephen Mopope, to represent an unbroken line of artistic tradition.

One of Jennings' cradleboards was included in a national traveling exhibition titled "Gifts of Pride and Love" that featured 38 cradles from various Native American tribal traditions. The exhibit also emphasized female artists, who have long been overlooked by histories focusing on the male Indian warrior culture. The exhibition began in December 1999 at the Gilcrease Museum in Tulsa, Oklahoma, and included stops at the Heard Museum in Phoenix, Arizona, the Fowler Museum of Cultural History in Los Angeles, California, the Smithsonian National Museum of the American Indian in Washington, D.C., the Oklahoma Museum of Natural History in Norman, Oklahoma, and the Mashantucket Pequot Museum and Research Center in Ledyard, Connecticut. Jennings wrote a chapter titled "Why I Make Cradles" in the catalog book that accompanied the exhibition.

Jennings' work has also been featured at the National Cowboy & Western Heritage Museum in Oklahoma City and the Buffalo Bill Historical Center in Cody, Wyoming, as well as in England and Scotland.

As of 2017, she is believed to be the last active Kiowa cradleboard maker on the Southern Plains.

She is a founding member of Artists for the Traditional Arts, an initiative of the National Council for the Traditional Arts.

== Awards and honors ==
At the inaugural Red Earth Festival in 1987, Jennings won prizes for her antelope headdress and a mountain lion bow case.

Jennings is a recipient of a 1989 National Heritage Fellowship awarded by the National Endowment for the Arts, which is the United States government's highest honor in the folk and traditional arts. That honor also includes recognition as a Living National Treasure by the US president and congress.

In 1992, she received the Red Earth Festival President's Award.

In 1996, Jennings and her artwork were honored in a Plains Indian Seminar sponsored by the Buffalo Bill Center of the West, titled "Powerful Expressions: Art of Plains Indian Women". The seminar's keynote address noted that "the way Vanessa lives epitomizes the best kinds of values and virtues of Plains Indian women".

In 2004, she was named the Honored One by the Red Earth Festival, which is the highest honor bestowed upon an artist by the festival.

She has earned multiple awards in various categories at the Santa Fe Indian Market, including in 1997, 2003, 2010, and 2016.

She has also won awards at the Great Plains Indian Rendezvous.

== Personal life ==
Jennings lives in Red Stone, east of Fort Cobb, Oklahoma. She had three children from her first marriage. Because her parents died in the 1950s, she was unable to follow the Kiowa tradition of having the grandparents directly raise their grandchildren, so Jennings raised her three children by herself. She married Carl Jennings in 1993. As of 2004, she had four grandchildren, and she also raised her sister's eight children following her death.

Two of Jennings' children are also traditional artists. Gabriel Morgan is a ledger artist, pipe maker and flute player. Seth Morgan is also a ledger artist and pipe maker, in addition to working with beads, making bows and arrows, and writing poetry.

As of 2003, she has survived four strokes.
