= Spencer Asah =

Kiowa painter (c.1906–1956)

- Born: Lallo c. 1906–1910; Carnegie, Oklahoma, US
- Died: 1956
- Education: University of Oklahoma
- Known for: Painting
- Movement: Kiowa Six

Spencer Asah (c. 1906–1956) was a Kiowa painter and a member of the Kiowa Six from Oklahoma.

== Early life ==
Spencer Asah was born in 1906 in Carnegie, Oklahoma. His Kiowa name was Lallo (Little Boy). His father was a buffalo medicine man. Asah's father provided him with extensive cultural information that he later used in his art.

Asah attended St. Patrick's Mission School in Anadarko, Oklahoma, where he received his first art instruction from Sister Olivia Taylor, a Choctaw nun. Government field matron Susie Peters arranged for Mrs. Willie Baze Lane, an artist from Chickasha, Oklahoma, to provide further art instruction for young Kiowa artists, including Asah. Recognizing the talent of some of the young artists, Peters convinced Swedish-American artist Oscar Jacobson, director of the University of Oklahoma's School of Art, to accept the Kiowa students into a special program at the school, in which they were coached and encouraged by Edith Mahier.

== Kiowa Six ==
The Kiowa Six, included five artists: Spencer Asah, James Auchiah, Jack Hokeah, Stephen Mopope, Lois Smoky Kaulaity, and Monroe Tsatoke. In 1926, Asah, Hokeah, Tsatoke, Mopope, and Smoky moved to Norman, Oklahoma and began their art studies at OU. Smoky returned home late in 1927, while Auchiah joined the group that year.

In 1928, the Kiowa Six had their major breakthrough into the international fine arts' world by exhibiting at the First International Art Exposition in Prague, Czechoslovakia. Dr. Jacobson arranged for their work to be shown in several other countries and for Kiowa Art, a portfolio of pochoir print artists' paintings, to be published in France. Towards the late 1920s, their critically acclaimed watercolor art works were being shown throughout the United States and Europe.

== Public collections ==
Asah's work can be found in the following public art collections:

- Anadarko City Museum
- Denver Art Museum
- Gilcrease Museum
- Heard Museum
- Indian Arts and Crafts Board, US Department of the Interior
- Indian Arts and Crafts Board, Denman Collection
- The George Gustav Heye Center
- McNay Art Museum
- Museum of Northern Arizona
- Museum of Northern Arizona, Katherine Harvey Collection
- Museum of New Mexico
- Oklahoma Science and Art Foundation, Gerrer Collection
- Fred Jones Jr. Museum of Art
- Philbrook Museum of Art
- Southern Plains Indian Museum
- Woolaroc Museum

== Later life ==
Spencer Asah was a traditional singer and dancer who was active in Oklahoma's powwow circuit. Asah married Ida, a Comanche woman, with whom he had three children. He died in 1954.

== See also ==
- List of Native American artists
- Visual arts by indigenous peoples of the Americas
