= 2024 Sacramento County Board of Supervisors election =

Local election in California

- March 5 (primary)

2 of 5 seats on Sacramento County Board of Supervisors

The 2024 Sacramento County Board of Supervisors election took place on March 5, 2024, to elect two of the five seats of the Sacramento County Board of Supervisors. Runoffs would only occur if no candidate received more than 50% of the votes cast in the contest, but no runoffs occurred this year for the Sacramento County Board of Supervisors. Local elections in California are officially nonpartisan. Each supervisor is elected to a four-year term, and does not have any term limits.

== District 3 ==
Incumbent Rich Desmond was elected to the 3rd district in 2020 in the runoff with 50.8% of the vote. He was eligible for reelection.

=== Endorsements ===
Rich Desmond

Newspapers

- The Sacramento Bee

Labor unions

- Teamsters Joint Council 7
- OE Local 3

Organizations

- MetroPAC
- Sacramento Association of Realtors
- Sacramento County Deputy Sheriffs' Association

=== Results ===
2024 Sacramento County Board of Supervisors 3rd district election
Primary election
Candidate	Votes	%
Rich Desmond (incumbent)	50,022	100.0
Total votes	50,022	100.0

== District 4 ==
Incumbent Sue Frost was elected to the 4th district in 2016 and 2020. She was eligible for reelection, but chose not to run.

=== Endorsements ===
Rosario Rodriguez

Organizations

- MetroPAC
- Sacramento Association of Realtors

Local officials

- Sue Frost, outgoing member of the Sacramento County Board of Supervisors from the 4th district
Braden Murphy

Organizations

- California Democratic Renters' Council
- Center for Biological Diversity Action Fund
- Courage California
- Sacramento Latino Democratic Club
- Wellstone Progressive Democrats/Our Revolution Sacramento

Labor unions

- California Nurses Association
- National Nurses United
- National Union of Healthcare Workers
- Sacramento Central Labor Council
- SEIU Local 1021
- SEIU Local 2015
- Sheet Metal Workers’ Local 104

Political party chapters

- Sacramento County Democratic Party
- Sacramento County Young Democrats
- Working Families Party

=== Results ===
2024 Sacramento County Board of Supervisors 4th district election
Primary election
Candidate	Votes	%
Rosario Rodriguez	33,440	51.5
Bret C. Daniels	17,078	26.3
Braden Murphy	14,455	22.2
Total votes	64,973	100.0
