= Susan Peters (disambiguation) =

Susan Peters (1921–1952) was an American stage, film and television actress.

Susan or Sue Peters may refer to:

- Susan Peters (politician), Republican who serves on the Sacramento County Board of Supervisors
- Susan Peters (TV anchor), American TV anchor
- Susan Peters (Nigerian actress) (born 1980)
- Sue Peters, character in the TV series Worzel Gummidge

== See also ==
- Susie Peters, American art preservationist
