= David E. Williams =

Native American painter

David Emmett Williams
- Born: Tosque; August 20, 1933; Lawton, Oklahoma, US
- Died: November 8, 1985 (aged 52); Tahlequah, Oklahoma
- Citizenship: Kiowa Tribe of Oklahoma, United States
- Occupation: Native American painter
- Years active: 1959–1980

David Emmett Williams (Tonkawa name: Tosque; August 20, 1933 – November 8, 1985) was a Native American painter, who was Kiowa/Tonkawa/Kiowa-Apache from Oklahoma. He studied with Dick West (Southern Cheyenne) at Bacone College and won numerous national awards for his paintings. He painted in the Flatstyle technique that was taught at Bacone from the 1940s to the 1970s.

== Background ==
David Emmett Williams (Tonkawa name: Tosque) was born on August 20, 1933, in Lawton, Oklahoma, to singer and leather-worker Emmett Williams (Tonkawa/Kiowa Apache) and his Kiowa wife, Jennie Sahkoodlequoie, who was descended of Satanka (Sitting Bear, ca. 1800–1871). Census records confirm Williams was a full-blood but show his father's heritage was Comanche.

== Education ==
Williams studied at the Indian Art Center in Fort Sill, Oklahoma, under Olle Nordmark and later at Bacone College with fellow Native American painters, Joan Hill (Muscogee/Cherokee) and Doc Tate Nevaquaya (Comanche) under Dick West.

Williams did not pursue painting seriously until 1959. Prior to that, he performed as a powwow dancer and singer and worked in a shoe factory. He became serious and passionate about art in the early 1960s and worked in acrylic, gouache, pencil, distemper, and printmaking. All of the artists of this period at Bacone were taught the Bacone style, a Flatstyle painting style, which was often showcased at the Philbrook Museum of Art's Indian Annual, a competitive juried art show. Philbrook and Bacone had an agreement in the 1940s through the 1960s period whereby student's work would be hung and offered for sale, with the school garnering one third of the profits of any sale.

== Art career ==
Williams participated in the annual competitions and was one of the Grand Award winners in the early 1960s. He also won, during the same time frame, the national competition held at the Bismarck National Indian Art Show in Bismarck, North Dakota.

In 1961, Williams married Norma Jean Eubanks and the couple moved to Los Angeles. Actor Vincent Price, who was a major collector and advocate of Native American art, purchased 50 of William's paintings to sell through Sears Roebuck's Fine Arts Collection nationwide. William's first solo exhibition was at the Heard Museum in Phoenix, in 1964. That same year, he also did a two-man show with sand painter, David Villasenor, at the Pasadena Public Library. He had other solo shows at the Southern Plains Indian Museum and Craft Center in Anadarko, Oklahoma, the Southwest Museum of the American Indian in Los Angeles and the Tryon Gallery in London.

By 1970, the Williams family had decided to move back to Oklahoma and lived in Tahlequah with their two sons. In 1980, Williams designed the centennial logo for Bacone College. By 1981, he mostly stopped painting after losing his eyesight to diabetes. In 1983, he was inducted into the Bacone College Alumni Hall of Fame.

== Exhibitions ==
In 1972, Williams participated in the traveling exhibition, Contemporary Southern Plains Indian Painting, sponsored by the Southern Plains Indian Museum and the Oklahoma Indian Arts and Crafts Co-operative of Anadarko. In 1974, he won the Grand Prize at the Trail of Tears Art Show at the Cherokee Heritage Center.

During his lifetime, Williams had multiple and profitable exhibitions throughout the United States including at the Arizona State Museum at the University of Arizona in Tucson; the First Annual National American Indian Art Exposition in Charlotte, North Carolina; the Laguna Gloria Art Museum of Austin, Texas; the McCombs Gallery at Bacone College in Muskogee, Oklahoma; the Owensboro Museum of Fine Art in Owensboro, Kentucky; among many others. He also won awards at the American Indian Exposition of Anadarko and the Inter-Tribal Indian Ceremonials in Gallup, New Mexico.

== Public collections ==
Besides in private collections, Williams’ work is part of the permanent collections in museums including the Cherokee Heritage Center in Park Hill, Oklahoma; Gilcrease Museum and the Philbrook Art Museum, both in Tulsa, Oklahoma; the Heard Museum in Phoenix, Arizona; the Southern Plains Indian Museum in Anadarko; and the Southwest Museum in Los Angeles, as well as the Smithsonian Institution's National Museum of the American Indian.

== Death ==
Williams died on November 8, 1985 of complications of diabetes.

== Selected works ==
- Woman Dancer, 1960
- Plains Indian War Dance, 1963
- Burial at Night, 1964
- Kachina Dance, 1966
- Comanche Rider, circa 1970s
- Empty Saddles: Return of War Party, circa 1970s
- Male Dancer, 1972
- Kiowa Fancy Dancer, 1972
- Kiowa Medicine Man, 1973
- The Five Civilized Tribes, 1974
- Hunter with Rifle, 1974
- Visions to Come, 1974
- The Last Remembrance, 1975
- Pursued, 1979
- Warriors Salute, 1979
