= Edith Mahier =

American artist and art instructor

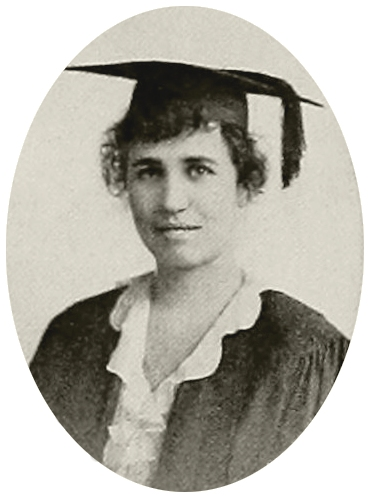
- Newcomb College, Tulane University, Senior portrait, 1916
- Born: Edith Albina Mahier; December 14, 1892; Baton Rouge, Louisiana, US
- Died: December 2, 1967 (aged 74); Natchez, Mississippi, US
- Occupations: artist and art instructor
- Known for: coaching the Kiowa Six
- Notable work: Roman Nose Canyon (1941), Watonga, Oklahoma

Edith Mahier (1892 – 1967) was an American artist and art instructor who was instrumental in helping develop the talent of the Kiowa Six during their studies at the University of Oklahoma. In 1941, she won the commission to complete the post office mural for the U.S. Treasury Department's Section of Fine Arts at the Watonga, Oklahoma, facility. In her later career at OU she created a division of the arts department dedicated to fashion and even designed motifs for a clothing line developed by Neiman Marcus.

== Early life ==
Edith Albina Mahier was born on December 14, 1892, in Baton Rouge, Louisiana, to Henry and Maud B. Mahier. She came from an artistic family. Her sister Frances would later serve as the curator of the Louisiana Art Museum in Baton Rouge and design clothing. Her brother, John would run a pottery factory in their home town called Forest Studios. Mahier attended Sophie Newcomb College, the women's college affiliate of Tulane University, studying under Ellsworth Woodward and graduating 1916. Following her graduation, she worked as an illustrator at the New Orleans Item. In 1917, Mahier was hired as an art teacher at the University of Oklahoma (OU) for the salary of $80 per month. She was a member of Gamma Phi Beta In 1919, when Tulane created the Bachelor of Design degree, Mahier and other prior students whose work was of special merit were retroactively awarded the degree. She later studied at the New York School of Fine and Applied Arts under George Bridgman.

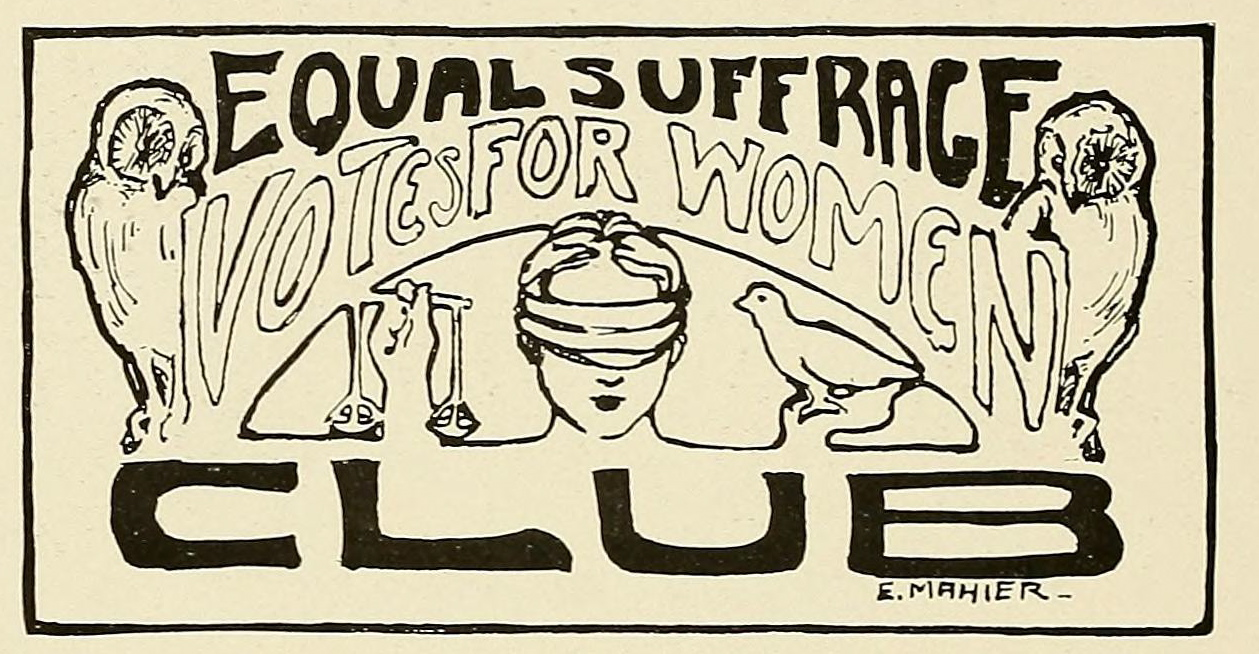
Illustration for the 1915 Jambalaya by Mahier

== Career ==
Mahier, who was known as "Eli" to her students, taught while continuing to create her own artwork. In 1918, her painting The Pot of Gold at the End of the Rainbow was singled out for acclaim during an exhibition of Southwestern artists and her exhibited works were selling. By 1919 she was running the art department during Oscar Jacobson's absence and in 1921, she was appointed as artistic director for the university magazine. In 1924, the museum that would later become the Fred Jones Jr. Museum of Art held a solo exhibit of her artwork, and soon after she took a leave of absence to study abroad. She was asked to exhibit at the Paris Salon in 1925 and was the first American and first woman to study fresco at the Accademia di Belle Arti di Firenze.

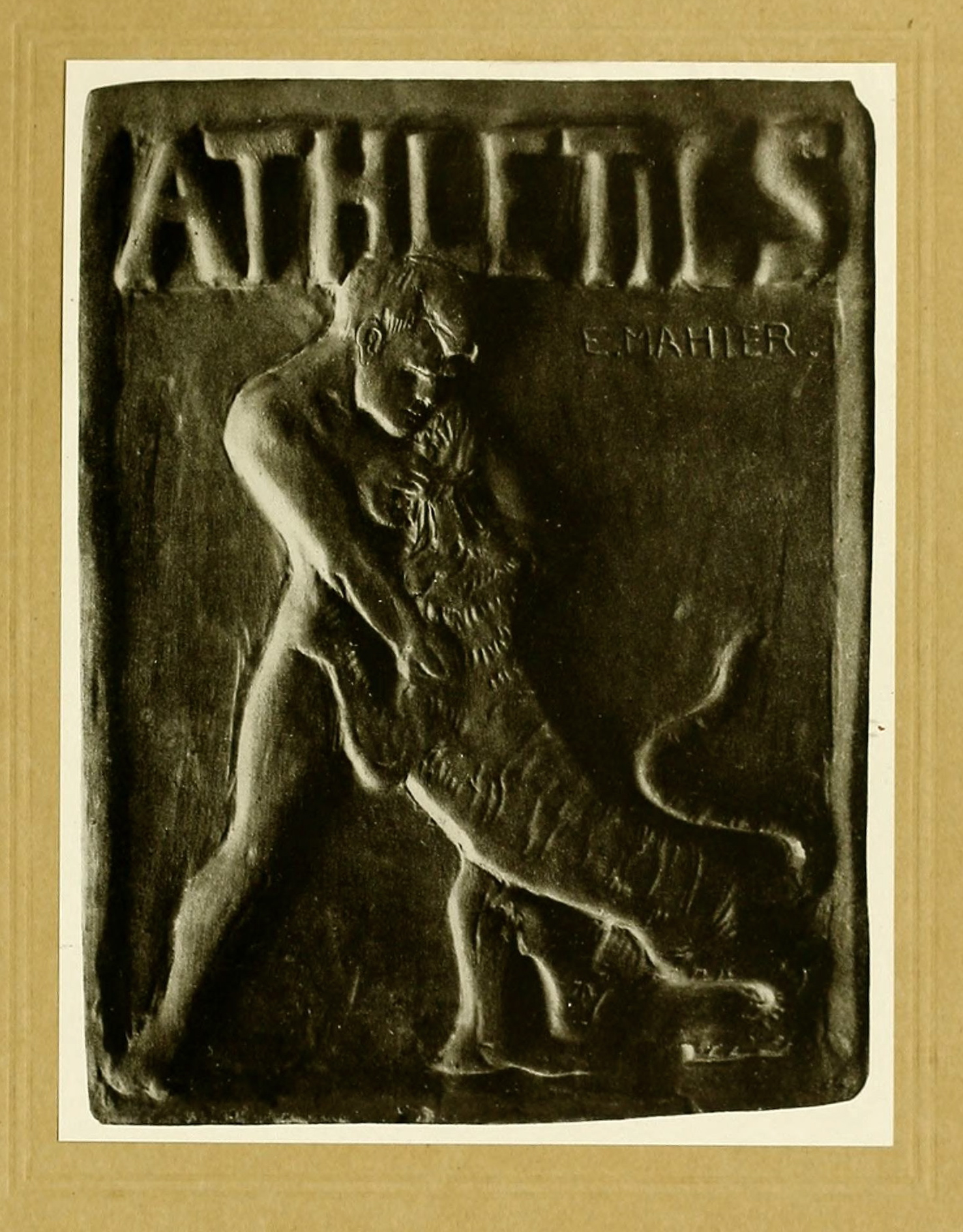
"Athletics" by Mahier, 1916

In 1926, Mahier met with Susie Peters and two Kiowa artists, Spencer Asah and Jack Hokeah. The following term, Asah, Hokeah and their fellow artists, Stephen Mopope and Monroe Tsatoke were admitted to a special program at the university and Mahier became their teacher, critic and mentor. Since the Kiowa artists did not meet the entrance requirements and Jacobson was convinced their natural talent needed only coaching, Mahier allowed them to use her office as a studio and gave them a balance of criticism and encouragement. She was forbidden to give instruction on abstract techniques, perspective, or shading, but guided them with discussions about anatomy, including the question of whether Indians had six fingers, and comments about rhythm and design elements. Between semesters, the boys returned to the reservation to work, but returned in January 1927, accompanied by Lois Smoky. By the fall of that year, they were joined by James Auchiah. Exhibitions of their work at the Denver Art Museum and on a tour in Czechoslovakia soon earned the group the name of the Kiowa Six, critical acclaim and enduring fame. Their work showed in the U.S. Pavilion at the 1932 Venice Biennial, the only year Native American artists have shown in the U.S. Pavilion.

By 1935, Mahier had become an associate professor when she was honored by inclusion in the volume American women, along with 8 other OU faculty women and around 6,000 women from throughout the nation who had earned recognition in their fields. She began teaching a two-year fashion drawing course in 1938 when the university created a new five-year degree program, Art for Industry, which became the Fashion Arts curriculum in 1941 under her direction. She and her sister, Frances Mahier Brandon, were instrumental in bringing Native American design to fashion, after they presented research on various tribal motifs to Stanley Marcus head of Neiman Marcus. The designs were later featured in Vogue, and the March issue of Holland's Magazine, when Neiman Marcus developed a fashion line around the motifs.

That same year, Mahier won the federal commission to paint a mural for the post office mural project for the U.S. Treasury Department's Section of Fine Arts at the Watonga, Oklahoma, facility. She was the only Oklahoma woman to paint murals in Oklahoma as part of the project. Her painting, Roman Nose Canyon, shows Cheyenne Chief Henry Roman Nose in the center of the painting with a rifle, accompanied by his family and other Cheyenne. Behind the chief is a Conestoga wagon with settlers who have stopped for water in the rugged canyon terrain, painted with bright oranges and reds. The artwork was controversial for the local Southern Cheyenne tribe. Chief Red Bird criticized the depiction of Chief Roman Nose, saying that the painting made him "look like a Navajo" and complained that the breech clout was too short and the feathers were worn too far forward on his head.

Mahier founded and became the faculty advisor of a fashion fabrication organization called "Shadowbox", in which students and manufacturers could work together on innovations. In the 1950s, her Fashion Design curricula was moved to the home economics department, when she was transferred there. She completed her OU tenure as the head of the fashion and textiles department, retiring in 1963. Thereafter, she moved to Natchez, Mississippi, where her sister resided.

== Death and interment ==
At the time of her death, Mahier was living in the Williamsburg (Bahin House) which is listed on the National Register of Historic Places. Mahier died December 2, 1967, in Natchez, Mississippi.
