= Shirley Ann Thompson-Smith =

- Born: Shirley Ann Thompson; December 9, 1929; St. Louis, Missouri, United States
- Died: August 28, 2023 (aged 93); Oklahoma City, Oklahoma, United States
- Education: University of Oklahoma

Shirley Ann Thompson-Smith (December 9, 1929 – August 28, 2023) was an American sculptor from Oklahoma whose work has been exhibited in the Gilcrease Museum and the National Cowboy and Western Heritage Museum.

== Biography ==
Shirley Ann Thompson was born on December 9, 1929, in St. Louis, Missouri, to Courtland and Helen Vaughn Thomson. In 1935, he family moved to Oklahoma City where she attended Oklahoma City Public Schools. She later graduated from the University of Oklahoma where she studied under Joseph R. Taylor. In 1951, she married Joe D. Smith and the couple had three children. The family spent three years in Durango, Colorado, in the late 1950s before returning to Oklahoma City. After divorcing Smith in 1973, she began a professional sculpting career. Her work has been exhibited in the Gilcrease Museum, the National Cowboy and Western Heritage Museum, the Haley Library and History Center in Midland, Texas, and the State of Oklahoma Art Collection. She died on August 28, 2023, in Oklahoma City.
