= 2020 Sacramento County Board of Supervisors election =

Local election in California

- March 3 (primary); November 4 (runoff)

2 of 5 seats on Sacramento County Board of Supervisors

The 2020 Sacramento County Board of Supervisors election took place on March 3, 2020, to elect two of the five seats of the Sacramento County Board of Supervisors, with runoffs taking place on November 4, 2020. Runoffs only occur if no candidate receives more than 50% of the votes cast in the contest. Local elections in California are officially nonpartisan. Each supervisor is elected to a four-year term, and does not have any term limits.

== District 3 ==
Incumbent Susan Peters was elected to the 3rd district in 2004, 2008, 2012, and 2016. She was eligible for reelection, but chose not to run.

=== Endorsements ===
Rich Desmond

State officials

- Jim Cooper, member of the California State Assembly from the 9th district

Local officials

- Anne Marie Schubert, Sacramento County District Attorney
Gregg Fishman

Federal officials

- Ami Bera, member of the U.S. House of Representatives from the 7th district

State officials

- Ken Cooley, member of the California State Assembly from the 8th district

Local officials

- Darrell Steinberg, mayor of Sacramento
- Phil Serna, member of the Sacramento County Board of Supervisors from the 1st district

Newspapers

- The Sacramento Bee

Political party chapters

- Latinx Young Democrats of Sacramento County
- Sacramento County Democratic Party
- Sacramento County Young Democrats

Labor unions

- IBEW Local 1245
- Sacramento Central Labor Council

=== Results ===
2020 Sacramento County Board of Supervisors 3rd district election
Primary election
Candidate	Votes	%
Rich Desmond	32,075	42.7
Gregg Fishman	19,446	25.9
Tiffany Mock-Goeman	8,042	10.7
Matt Ceccato	7,897	10.5
Catrayel N. Wood	7,610	10.1
Total votes	75,070	100.0
General election
Rich Desmond	66,397	50.8
Gregg Fishman	64,178	49.2
Total votes	130,575	100.0

== District 4 ==
Incumbent Sue Frost was elected to the 4th district in 2016 in the runoff with 54.6% of the vote. She was eligible for reelection.

=== Results ===
2020 Sacramento County Board of Supervisors 4th district election
Primary election
Candidate	Votes	%
Sue Frost (incumbent)	54,073	75.6
Bridget Duffy	17,494	24.4
Total votes	71,567	100.0
