= Jack Hokeah =

American painter (1901–1969)

Jack Hokeah (December 4, 1901 - December 14, 1969) was a Kiowa painter, one of the Kiowa Six, from Oklahoma.

== Early life ==
Jack Hokeah was born in 1901 in western Oklahoma. He was orphaned at a very young age and raised by his grandmother. His grandfather was the Kiowa warrior White Horse.

Hokeah attend St. Patrick's Indian Mission School in Anadarko, Oklahoma, and there he received his first art instruction from Sister Olivia Taylor, a Choctaw nun. Susan Peters, the field matron for the Kiowa agency, arranged for Mrs. Willie Baze Lane, an artist from Chickasha, Oklahoma, to provide further art instruction for the young Indians, including Spencer Asah. Recognizing the talent of some of the young artists, Peters convinced Swedish-American artist Oscar Jacobson, director of the University of Oklahoma's School of Art, to accept the Kiowa students into a special program at the school, in which they were coached and encouraged by Edith Mahier.

== Kiowa Six ==
The Kiowa Six included Spencer Asah, James Auchiah, Jack Hokeah, Stephen Mopope, Lois Smoky Kaulaity, and Monroe Tsatoke. In 1926 Asah, Hokeah, Tsatoke, Mopope, and Smoky moved to Norman, Oklahoma and began their art studies at OU. Smoky returned home late in 1927, but Auchiah joined the group that year.

In the 1928, the Kiowa Fives debuted in the international fine arts world by participating in the First International Art Exposition in Prague, Czechoslovakia. Dr. Jacobson arranged for their work to be shown in several other countries and for Kiowa Art, a portfolio of pochoir prints and artists' paintings, to be published in France.

== Individual pursuits ==
Jack Hokeah was an excellent dancer and singer, which competed with painting for his time. He, alone of the Kiowa Six, studied at the Studio in Santa Fe Indian School.

In 1930, with Spencer Asah and Stephen Mopope, Hokeah participated in the Gallup Inter-Tribal Indian Ceremonial Dances. There he befriended celebrated San Ildefonso Pueblo potter Maria Martinez, who ultimately adopted him as son. He stayed with her family many times in the ensuing decade.

== Public collections ==
Hokeah's work can be found in the following public art collections:

- Anadarko City Museum
- Cleveland Museum of Art
- Denver Art Museum
- The George Gustav Heye Center
- Gilcrease Museum
- Indian Arts and Crafts Board, US Department of the Interior
- Joclyn Art Museum
- McNay Art Museum
- Museum of Fine Arts, Houston
- Museum of Northern Arizona
- Museum of Northern Arizona, Katherine Harvey Collection
- Museum of New Mexico
- Millicent Rogers Museum
- Philbrook Museum of Art
- Seminole Public Library
- Southern Plains Indian Museum

== Death ==
Hokeah died in Fort Cobb, Oklahoma, on December 14, 1969.
