= James Auchiah =

American painter

- Born: Tsekoyate; November 17, 1906; Oklahoma, US
- Died: December 28, 1974 (aged 68); Carnegie, Oklahoma, US
- Education: University of Oklahoma
- Known for: Painting
- Movement: Kiowa Six

James Auchiah (1906–1974) was a Kiowa painter and one of the Kiowa Six from Oklahoma.

== Early life ==
James Auchiah was born on 17 November 1906 in Oklahoma Territory, near present-day Meers and Medicine Park, Oklahoma. His Kiowa name was Tsekoyate, meaning "Big Bow". His father was Mark Auchiah, and his grandfathers were Chief Satanta and Red Tipi, a medicine man, bundle keeper and ledger artist, respectively.

Auchiah was a student in government schools, where he was not supported in learning about his Kiowas culture. In 1890 the tribe was forcibly not allowed by the white soldiers to perform the Sun Dance, which is their most spiritual dance. Afterwards the tribe did not try to perform the dance. Auchiah first studied art at St. Patrick's Indian Mission School in Anadarko, Oklahoma, under Sister Olivia Taylor, a Choctaw nun. His love for art was such that in elementary school, he was caught painting in class. As punishment, the teacher made him finish his painting instead of eating dinner. The young Auchiah said in response that was fine with him, "I would rather paint than eat." The skills of several young Kiowa living near Anadarko, Oklahoma had caught the eye of a government field matron, Susan Peters, in 1920. She noticed the artistic talent of Kiowa children and teens as they drew sketches on feed bags while waiting for their parents receiving rations at the government Kiowa field office. Susan Peters arranged for four young Kiowa, later adding a fifth student, James Auchiah, in helping them enter art classes at the University of Oklahoma. Peters arranged for Mrs. Willie Baze Lane, an artist from Chickasha, Oklahoma to provide further art instruction for the young Indians, including Auchiah. Recognizing the talent of some of the young artists, Peters convinced Swedish-American artist, Oscar Jacobson, director of the University of Oklahoma's School of Art, to accept the Kiowa students into a special program at the school. They were coached and encouraged by Edith Mahier.

== Kiowa Six ==
The Kiowa Six, included six artists: Spencer Asah, James Auchiah, Jack Hokeah, Stephen Mopope, Lois Smoky Kaulaity and Monroe Tsatoke. James Auchiah was the last to join the group at OU in 1926.

The Kiowa Six's first major breakthrough in the international fine art world was the 1928 First International Art Exposition in Prague, Czechoslovakia. In January 1927 Dr. Oscar B. Jacobson, Director of the School of Art at the University of Oklahoma, invited Spencer Asah, Jack Hokeah, Stephen Mopope, Louise Smoky Kaulaity, Monroe Tsatoke, and, later, James Auchiah to live in Norman so that he could instruct them. With Jacobson's support they improved their skills while keeping their own unique style. Jacobson organized an exhibit of their art at the university and afterwards their art was shown outside the university. Their art then gained national attention in November 1927 at the convention of the American Federation of Arts. Afterwards they traveled around the nation exhibiting their art gaining more notice from art critics. In 1928 their art was shown at an art festival in Prague, Czechoslovakia. The Kiowa paintings become a popular attraction internationally. By the 1930s many of the Kiowa painters were commissioned to paint for several occasions.

== Sun Dance ==
The last Sun Dance took place on the Washita River above Rainy Mountain Creek in 1887. The Sun Dance is a sacred dance for the Kiowa, especially when the Dance involved the Sun Dance Doll, Tai-Me. Tai-Me characterized the most powerful medicine and symbolized a Kiowa's spiritual well being. The final time Tai-Me was represented in the dance was in 1887, the last time the dance took place.

== Grandfather's burial ==
Jame's grandfather, chief Satanta, was arrested with another chief during a wagon train raid on May 18, 1871. The two chiefs were sentenced to death by hanging, but only through the intervention of Indian officials, they were sentenced to life in prison. In 1873 the two chiefs gained parole and were released from prison. in 1874 during the Red River War chief Satanta was arrested again. He was in prison for four years until he learned that he would not gain parole again and committed suicide. He was buried by convicts in the prison cemetery.

James and his family obtained permission to exhume the remains of Satanta eighty-five years after his death, following an extended legal process. The remains were subsequently reinterred at a different burial site. Prior to the reinterment, James conducted a Kiowa ceremony in which cedar dust and gray granite dust were sprinkled onto a fire constructed at the end of the grave, in accordance with cultural practices intended to honor the deceased and facilitate the transition to a new resting place.

== Individual pursuits ==
During the 1920s and 1930s, Auchiah painted murals at the Oklahoma Historical Society, St. Patrick's Mission School, and the United States Department of the Interior.

As his art progressed, he incorporated more imagery from the Native American Church, of which he was a leader. His work became more stylized, symbolic, and visionary.

He joined the US Coast Guard during World War II. Later he taught art and was an illustrator for the US Department of the Interior. Auchiah also worked at the US Army Artillery and Missile Center Museum in Fort Sill, Oklahoma and was a curator there.

== Public collections ==
Auchiah's work can be found in the following public art collections:

- Anadarko City Museum
- Castillo de San Marcos National Monument
- Fred Jones Jr. Museum of Art
- Gilcrease Museum
- Indian Arts and Crafts Board, US Department of the Interior
- The George Gustav Heye Center
- McNay Art Museum
- Museum of New Mexico
- National Museum of the American Indian
- Oklahoma Historical Society
- Oklahoma Science and Art Foundation, Gerrer Collection
- Philbrook Museum of Art
- US Army Artillery and Missile Center Museum

== Death ==
Auchiah died in Carnegie, Oklahoma on 28 December 1974, although it is sometimes listed as being in 1975.

== See also ==
- List of Native American artists
- Visual arts by indigenous peoples of the Americas
