= Lois Smoky Kaulaity =

Kiowa painter from Oklahoma (1907–1981_

- Bougetah (Kiowa: "Of the Dawn"), Lois Smoky
- Born: Louise Smoky; April 8, 1907; Near Anadarko, Oklahoma
- Died: February 1, 1981 (aged 73); Oklahoma
- Citizenship: Kiowa Tribe of Oklahoma and American
- Education: St. Patrick's Indian Mission School, University of Oklahoma
- Known for: beadwork, regalia-making, painting
- Movement: Kiowa Six, Kiowa beadwork
- Spouse(s): Perry Arthur Keahtigh, Robert Hickman Kaulaity, Linn D. Pauahty
- Patrons: Oscar Jacobson

Lois Smoky Kaulaity (1907–1981) was a Kiowa beadwork artist and a painter, one of the Kiowa Six, from Oklahoma.

== Early life ==
Louise "Lois" Smoky was born in 1907 near Anadarko, Oklahoma. Bougetah was her Kiowa name, meaning "Of the Dawn." Her mother was Maggie Aukoy Smokey (1869–1963), and her father was Enoch Smokey (1880–1969), the great-nephew of Kiowa chief Appiatan. Her parents lived in Verden, Oklahoma.

Smoky first studied art at St. Patrick's Indian Mission School, under the guidance of Sister Mary Olivia Taylor, a Choctaw/Chickasaw nun, and received encouragement from Father Aloysius Hitta and Sister Deo Gratias at the school. Susan Peters, the Kiowa agency field matron, arranged for Willie Baze Lane, an artist from Chickasha, Oklahoma, to teach painting classes to young Kiowas in Anadarko. Recognizing the talent of some of the artists, Peters convinced Swedish-American painter Oscar Jacobson, director of the University of Oklahoma's School of Art, to accept the Kiowa students into a special program at the school in which they were coached and encouraged by Edith Mahier.

== Kiowa Six ==
The Kiowa Six included Spencer Asah, James Auchiah, Jack Hokeah, Stephen Mopope, Lois Smoky Kaulaity, and Monroe Tsatoke. In the mid-20th century the group was known as the Kiowa Five. Smoky was the only woman and the youngest of the group. Finances were tight for the artists, so Smoky's parents helped them out by renting a house in Norman, where all they lived together. Smoky only studied at OU in 1928. James Auchiah joined the group after she left.

Unfortunately, Smoky was not able to attend in person the Kiowa Six's major breakthrough into the international fine arts world at the 1928 First International Art Exposition in Prague, Czechoslovakia, although her work was included. Dr. Jacobson arranged for their work to be shown in several other countries and for Kiowa Art, a portfolio of pochoir prints and artists' paintings, to be published in France. It is only in recent decades that her place among the Kiowa Six has been restored, thanks in part to the scholarship of Dr. Mary Jo Watson (Seminole) and the Jacobson House Native Art Center in Norman, Oklahoma.

Her paintings resembled the early work of the other Kiowa Six artists. They had minimal backgrounds and focused on individual figures or small groups of people. Smoky emphasized details of traditional clothing and regalia, and she painted Kiowa people attending to daily life or ceremonial pursuits.

== Individual pursuits ==
Her family wanted her to return home, so Lois Smoky Kaulaity cut her painting career short. Upon returning home, Kaulaity married and devoted herself to her husband and children. Her married name was Lois Kaulaity, and she lived in Verden, Oklahoma for most of her life. She did develop a reputation for her fine beadwork, creating several innovations still used by Kiowa beadwork artists today. Ironically, because hers is the rarest work among the Kiowa Six, Kaulaity's work is most collectible.

Kaulaity's figurative painting was a breakthrough for Southern Plains Indian women, because historically Plains women painted geometrical designs, such as those found on parfleches rather than narrative, representational work.

Flora Belle Schrock (Kiowa, 1919–2018), Kaulaity's niece, said in 1995, "Aunt Louise was a hard worker... for her family. [She] started doing some beadwork, too. She really enjoyed it. And I think she had ambition [that] could have furthered... [her] art ability... But after she got married, she said, 'It's just impossible now with the children.'"

== Public collections ==
Smoky's work can be found in the following public art collections:

- National Museum of the American Indian George Gustav Heye Center
- Gilcrease Museum
- Jacobson House Native Art Center
- McNay Art Museum
- Millicent Rogers Museum
- Philbrook Museum of Art

== Death ==
Kaulaity died February 1, 1981.
