= Stephen Mopope =

American painter

Stephen Mopope (1898–1974) was a Kiowa painter, dancer, and Native American flute player from Oklahoma. He was the most prolific member of the group of artists known as the Kiowa Six.

== Early life ==
Stephen Mopope was born on 27 August 1898 near the Redstone Baptist Mission on the Kiowa Reservation in Indian Territory. Qued Koi was his Kiowa name, which translates as "Painted Robe," and is sometimes spelled, "Wood Coy." His maternal grandfather was Appiatan, a famed Kiowa warrior, and his great-uncles were Silver Horn and Oheltoint (Ohettoint), both of whom were accomplished artists. Oheltoint was one of the Fort Marion ledger artists. Mopope's paternal grandfather was a Spanish captive, adopted by Kiowa chief Many Bears.

When Mopope was a young child, his relatives observed him drawing pictures in the sand, so the artists in his family taught him how to paint on hides in the traditional manner. His grandmother was also instrumental in his early education.

In 1916, Mopope attended St. Patrick's Indian Mission School in Anadarko, Oklahoma, where he received further art instruction under Sister Olivia Taylor, a Choctaw nun. In a move that contradicted US federal policy at the time, Susan Peters, the Kiowa agency field matron, arranged for Mrs. Willie Baze Lane, an artist from Chickasha, Oklahoma, to teach painting classes for young Kiowas in Anadarko. Recognizing the talent of some of the young artists, Peters convinced Swedish-American artist, Oscar Jacobson, director of the University of Oklahoma's School of Art to accept the Kiowa students into a special program at the school, in which they were coached and encouraged by Edith Mahier.

== Kiowa Six ==
The Kiowa Six included Mopope as well as fellow artists Spencer Asah, James Auchiah, Jack Hokeah, Lois Smoky and Monroe Tsatoke. Auchiah was the last to join the group at OU in 1926.

In 1928, the Kiowa Six made their debut into the international fine arts world, when they participated in the First International Art Exposition in Prague, Czechoslovakia. Dr. Jacobson arranged for their work to be shown in several other countries and for Kiowa Art, a portfolio of pochoir prints and artists' paintings, to be published in France.

== Art career ==
Detail of mural, a ceremonial shield with a bull's head, by Stephen Mopope, at the Department of Interior, Washington, D.C

Mopope was commissionined to paint murals in the US Department of the Interior building in Washington, DC, along with five other Native aristists, including James Auchiah. Mopope's mural was 6 by 60 feet and portrayed a Kiowa ceremonial dance.

He joined the Native American Church and created stylized paintings that combined ceremonial implements with religious imagery. Besides being a visual artist, he was a highly accomplished dancer and flute-player.

Mopope's work was part of Stretching the Canvas: Eight Decades of Native Painting (2019–21), a survey at the National Museum of the American Indian George Gustav Heye Center in New York.

Mopope's granddaughter Vanessa Jennings is a Kiowa/Apache/Pima beadwork artist and regalia maker.

== Public collections ==
Mopope's work can be found in the following public art collections:

- Anadarko City Museum
- Anadarko Community Library
- Bank of America Collection, Phoenix, Arizona
- Brigham City Museum of Art & History, Brigham City, Utah
- City of Anadarko
- Cleveland Museum of Art
- Dartmouth College Collection
- Fred Jones Jr. Museum of Art
- The George Gustav Heye Center
- Gilcrease Museum
- Heard Museum
- Indian Arts and Crafts Board, US Department of the Interior
- Mabee-Gerrer Museum of Art
- McNay Art Museum
- Museum of Northern Arizona, Katherine Harvey Collection
- Museum of New Mexico
- Millicent Rogers Museum
- National Gallery of Art
- Oklahoma Art Center
- Oklahoma Historical Society
- Oklahoma Museum of Natural History
- Oklahoma State Art Collection
- Oklahoma Science and Art Foundation, Gerrer Collection
- Peabody Essex Museum
- Philbrook Museum of Art
- Southwest Museum
- Seminole Public Library
- Smithsonian American Art Museum
- Southern Plains Indian Museum
- University of Oklahoma, Library
- Wheelwright Museum of the American Indian
- Woolaroc Museum

== Death ==
On 2 February 1974, Mopope died at Fort Cobb, Oklahoma.
