= Isabel Crawford =

Baptist missionary in Oklahoma (1865–1961)

- Born: May 26, 1865; Cheltenham, Ontario, Canada
- Died: November 18, 1961 (aged 96)
- Occupation: Baptist missionary in Oklahoma Territory

Isabel Alice Hartley Crawford (May 26, 1865 – November 18, 1961) was a Baptist missionary who worked with the Kiowa people in the Oklahoma Territory. Crawford, who had lost most of her hearing due to an illness, communicated with the Kiowa using Plains Indian sign language. She lived among the Kiowa for about eleven years, sharing their lives and helping them build their first church and, when she died, she was buried in their cemetery.

== Early life ==
Isabel Alice Hartley Crawford was born in Cheltenham, Ontario, Canada, the fourth child of John and Sarah Louise Hackett Crawford. John Crawford was raised a Presbyterian in County Londonderry, Ireland, but converted to the Baptist church as a teenager. When he was a new pastor in London, he met Sarah Hackett, who was originally from Dublin, Ireland. In about 1858, they immigrated, with their two oldest children, to Canada. The Crawford family settled in Cheltenham, north of Toronto, where Isabel and her brother were born.

In 1868, her family moved to Woodstock, Ontario, where her father became a professor of theology at the Canadian Literary Institute. In 1880, when the Institute moved to Toronto, John resigned and opened a school in Rapid City, Manitoba, Canada. The school was not a success and, in 1883, John was offered the pastorate at St. Thomas in the Dakota Territory. Isabel and her mother remained in Manitoba to close up the school. During that time, Isabel became gravely ill, and suffered fevers and pain for about six months. When she recovered, her hearing was severely impaired, "from an overdose of quinine", according to Crawford.

The Crawford's remained in the Dakota Territory until 1890 when John and Sarah returned to Ontario and, shortly afterwards, moved in with Isabel's sister and her husband, due to John's failing health.

After her parents moved back to Canada, Isabel attended a two-year course at the Baptist Missionary Training School in Chicago, graduating in 1893. She hoped to get a foreign posting but, instead, the Women's Baptist Home Mission Society (WBHMS) appointed her to the Elk Creek Mission on the Kiowa-Comanche-Apache reservation in the Oklahoma Territory.

== Missionary work ==
Because she was nearly deaf, Crawford had to communicate with the Kiowa through an interpreter, by lip reading, or using a hearing device that hung around her neck. The Native American used a sign language to communicate between tribes with different spoken languages; it became known as Plains Indian sign language. A Kiowa man, named Koptah, took it upon himself to teach this sign language to Crawford. She used sign language to teach the Kiowa about "the Jesus road".

Crawford had been at the Elk Creek Mission for three years when she was invited to move to Saddle Mountain, on the northern edge of the Wichita Mountains near Mountain View, Oklahoma, about thirty miles away. She agreed without consulting the board of the WBHMS and, in 1896, she moved to Saddle Mountain. Lucius Aitsan, a Kiowa who had been educated at the Carlisle Indian Industrial School in Pennsylvania and had served as an interpreter for other missionaries, interpreted for Crawford (in addition to her sign language). He was the first person to be baptized at Saddle Mountain. To win the trust of the Kiowa people, she shared chores with them, cleaning, baking bread, gathering firewood, caring for the sick. Crawford also taught the women to sew and used that time to teach them about the Bible.

=== Saddle Mountain Baptist Mission ===
The Kiowa who converted had to be taken 17 miles away to the Rainy Mountain Church, to be received as members. This was a very long trip, so the Saddle Mountain converts decided that they wanted a local church. Crawford secured a 160-acre allotment from the federal government for a mission and 40 additional acres for a cemetery. She taught the women to sew quilts, which they sold to raise money to build a church. According to Crawford, the $1000 for building the church came from: Indian contributions, $355.98; Quilt money, $311.63; Unsolicited, $250.00; Missionaries, $65.69; Miscellaneous, $16.70. The Saddle Mountain Baptist Church opened on Easter of 1903 with a congregation of 64 people.

The new church had no pastor, but they wanted to celebrate the Eucharist, so Crawford told them to elect one of their own to perform the service, and they chose Lucius Aitsan. The denominational mission board and the nearest baptist missionary pastor disapproved of this move. However, they continued to hold their own services when the visiting pastor was not available. In 1904, the congregation was censured by the Oklahoma Indian Baptist Association for having "deviated from the orderly practice of Baptist churches in the administration of the Lord's Supper", and Crawford resigned her position.

In 1963, the church was purchased by Herbert Woesner and moved to Eagle Park, Cache, Oklahoma, an amusement park and village of historic buildings. Local congregations in Cache began to use the church on Sunday mornings.

== Later career ==
The WBHMS had supported Crawford through the doctrinal dispute, and she continued to work for them, traveling around the country and speaking at churches and other gatherings. She became well known for ending her presentations with her Plains Indian sign language-version of the Lord's Prayer. Crawford back-translated the prayer into English, and it was published as a pamphlet:

The Great Father above a shepherd Chief is the same as, and I am His, and with Him I want not. He throws out to me a rope. The name of the rope is Love. He draws me, and draws me, and draws me to where the grass is green and the water not dangerous; and I eat and lie down satisfied.

Some days this soul of mine is very weak, and falls down, but He raises it up again and draws me into “trails” that are good. His name is Wonderful! Sometime, it may be in a little time, it may be longer and it may be a long, long time, I do not know, He will draw me into a place between mountains. It is dark there, but I will pull back not, and I will be afraid not, for it is in there between those mountains that the Great Shepherd Chief will meet me, and the hunger I have felt in my heart all through this life will be satisfied. Sometimes this rope that is Love He makes into a whip, and He whips me, and whips me, but afterward He gives me a staff to lean on.

He spreads a table before me and puts on it different kinds of food; but also meat, Chinamen’s food, white men’s food, and we all sit down and eat that which satisfies us. He puts His hand upon my head and all the “tired” is gone. He fills my cup till it runs over.

Now what I have been telling you is true. I talk two ways, not. These roads that are “away ahead” good will stay with me all through this life, and afterward I will move to the “Big Tepee” and sit down with the Shepherd Chief forever.

== Death and burial ==
Crawford retired in 1929 and moved in with two nieces in Grimsby, Ontario. Before she left Saddle Mountain, Crawford declared that she "would sooner lie hidden among the tall weeds of the unkept Indian cemetery . . . than in any other burial ground in the whole world." When she died on November 18, 1961, the Kiowa buried her in the Saddle Mountain Indian Baptist Church Cemetery near the graves of her first converts. The inscription on her tombstone read, "I Dwell Among Mine Own People."

== Bibliography ==
- Crawford, Isabel (1915). Kiowa: The History of a Blanket Indian Mission. Fleming H. Revell Company.
- Crawford, Isabel A. (1932). A Jolly Journal. Fleming H. Revell company.
- Crawford, Isabel (1951). Joyful Journey, Highlights on the High Way: An Autobiography. Judson Press.
- Crawford, Isabel (1998). Kiowa: A Woman Missionary in Indian Territory. U of Nebraska Press. ISBN 0-8032-6387-2.
