= Angela R. Riley =

Potawatomi–American jurist

Chief Justice of Citizen Potawatomi Nation
- Incumbent
- Assumed office 2010

Personal details
- Citizenship: Citizen Potawatomi Nation; United States
- Children: 2
- Education: University of Oklahoma; Harvard University

Angela R. Riley is an American and Potawatomi jurist serving as the chief justice of the Citizen Potawatomi Nation Supreme Court since 2010. She is a professor of law at UCLA School of Law. She is an appellate justice at both Rincon Band of Luiseño Indians Court of Appeals and the Pokagon Band of Potawatomi Indians Court of Appeals. In 2025, she was elected to the American Philosophical Society.

== Life ==
Riley is a member of Citizen Potawatomi Nation and a descendant of the Pettifer family. She grew up on a farm near Saddle Mountain, Oklahoma, and attended school in Mountain View. Riley earned an B.A. from the University of Oklahoma in 1995 and a J.D. in 1998 from Harvard Law School. After graduating, she clerked for chief judge Terence C. Kern of the Northern District of Oklahoma and then worked as a litigator at Quinn Emanuel, specializing in intellectual property litigation.

In 2003, Riley was appointed to the Supreme Court of the Citizen Potawatomi Nation, becoming the first woman and youngest Justice on the court. She was elected chief justice in 2010 and 2016. From 2010 to 2015, Riley served as Director of University of California, Los Angeles's (UCLA) American Indian Studies Center. In the fall of 2015, she was the Oneida Indian Nation Visiting professor of law at Harvard Law School. Riley is a professor of law at the UCLA School of Law. She directs UCLA's J.D./M.A. joint degree program in Law and American Indian Studies. In 2022, she became a special advisor to the university's Chancellor on Native American and Indigenous Affairs.

Riley's research focuses on indigenous rights, particularly cultural property and Native governance. She served as co-chair of the United Nations Indigenous Peoples' Partnership Policy Board, which supports the implementation of the Declaration on the Rights of Indigenous Peoples through financial and technical assistance. Riley has served as an evidentiary hearing officer for the Morongo Band of Mission Indians. As of 2022, she serves as an appellate justice at both the Rincon Band of Luiseño Indians Court of Appeals and the Pokagon Band of Potawatomi Indians Court of Appeals. Riley is a member of the American Law Institute.

Riley has two daughters.

== See also ==
- List of Native American jurists
