= Southern Plains Indian Museum =

Coordinates: 35.0730°N 98.2324°W

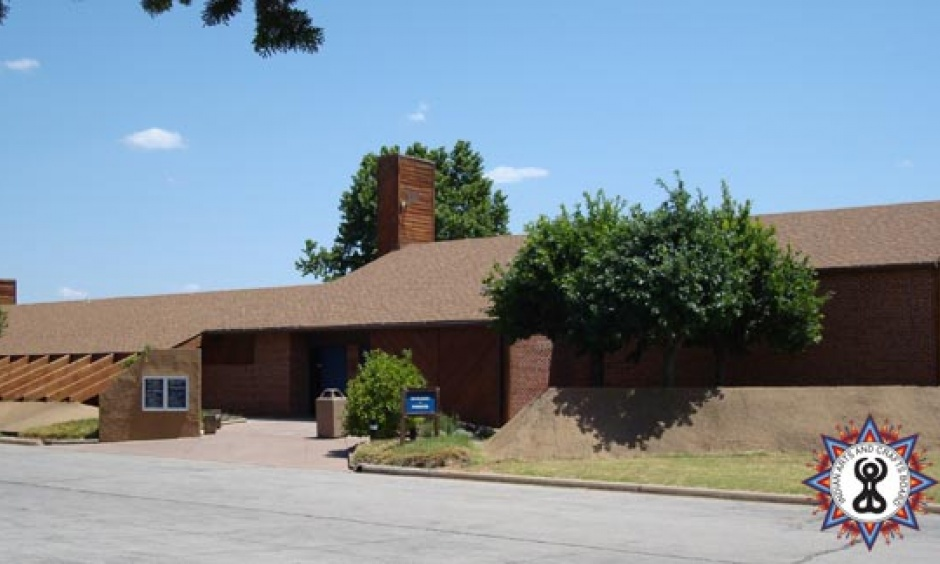
Southern Plains Indian Museum

Southern Plains Indian Museum is a Native American museum located in Anadarko, Oklahoma. It was opened in 1948 under a cooperative governing effort by the United States Department of the Interior and the Oklahoma state government. The museum features cultural and artistic works from Oklahoma tribal peoples of the Southern Plains region, including the Caddo, Chiricahua Apache, Comanche, Delaware Nation, Kiowa, Plains Apache, Southern Arapaho, Southern Cheyenne, and Wichita.

== History ==
Under a federal cooperative program begun in 1947 between the Government of Oklahoma and the United States Department of the Interior, plans were made to create a museum in Anadarko, Oklahoma, to present works by the tribal members of the Southern Plains who lived in Oklahoma. Costing $50,000, the museum officially opened on December 2, 1948. The museum houses a large permanent collection of both contemporary and historic cultural works of the Southern Plains tribes of Western Oklahoma including clothing, dance regalia, cultural items, jewelry, household objects, and weaponry. Also featured are artworks from Indigenous artists affiliated with the Great Plains region, including tribal people of the Caddo, Chiricahua Apache, Comanche, Delaware Nation, Kiowa, Plains Apache, Southern Arapaho, Southern Cheyenne, and Wichita. The museum notably showcases dioramas painted by Allan Houser (Chiricahua Apache, 1914–1994) and has many original paintings by T. C. Cannon (Kiowa/Caddo, 1946–1978) in its permanent collection.

In 1977, the Indian Arts and Crafts Board completed an extensive renovation of the museum, allowing more space for the permanent collection and traveling exhibits from other tribal people from throughout the United States. That same year, the museum launched a partnership with Oklahoma schools to offer free educational tours for groups of students wishing to study Plains cultures. Another major renovation was completed in 2001, to add the Rosemary Ellison Gallery to the museum space at a cost of $1 million. Featured in the permanent collection of the museum are works by Blackbear Bosin (Comanche/Kiowa), T.C. Cannon (Kiowa/Caddo), Mildred Cleghorn (Fort Sill Apache), Amanda Crowe (Eastern Cherokee), Sharron Ahtone Harjo (Kiowa), Jack Hokeah (Kiowa), Allan Houser (Apache), Solomon McCombs (Muscogee (Creek)), Stephen Mopope (Kiowa), Georgeann Robinson (Osage), Mary Tiger (Seminole), Dick West (Southern Cheyenne), and David E. Williams (Kiowa/Tonkawa/Plains Apache), among others.

In 2006, the US federal government slated the museum, along with the Museum of the Plains Indian in Browning, Montana and the Sioux Indian Museum in Rapid City, South Dakota for closure. Concerned with fighting counterfeiting and misappropriation of Native heritage, the government planned to divert funding for the museums toward fraud prevention, under the American Indian Arts and Crafts Act. The Bush Administration eventually scrapped the plan to close the museums and instead increased the funding to continue operating the museums. Adjacent to the museum is a ten-acre park which houses the National Hall of Fame for Famous American Indians, depicting sculptural busts of noted Native American figures.

== Hours ==
The museum is open from Tuesdays through Fridays, 10:00 a.m. to 4:30 p.m.
