= Georgeann Robinson =

Osage activist and artist

- Wah-kah-sah
- Georgeann Robinson, ribbonwork demonstration
- Born: Georgianna Gray; October 17, 1917; Pawhuska, Oklahoma, U.S.
- Died: September 4, 1985 (aged 67); Tipton, Indiana, U.S.
- Other name: Georgeann Gray Robinson
- Occupations: teacher, Native American activist, businesswoman, artist
- Years active: 1937–1985
- Known for: Osage ribbonwork preservation

Georgeann Robinson (Osage: Wah-kah-sah, October 13, 1917 – September 4, 1985) was an Osage teacher and businesswoman, who used her skill with ribbonwork to preserve the cultural heritage of her people. She was honored as a 1982 National Heritage Fellowship recipient by the National Endowment for the Arts and has works in the permanent collections of the Metropolitan Museum of Art in Manhattan, Museum of International Folk Art of Santa Fe, New Mexico and in the Southern Plains Indian Museum in Anadarko, Oklahoma. As an activist, from 1958, she was active in the National Congress of American Indians and in the late 1960s, was the executive vice president of the organization.

== Early life ==
Georgianna Gray, whose native name Wah-kah-sah means My Deer Is Running Pairs, was born on October 13, 1917 (Note: Other references give her date of birth as November 13; however, official Osage documents consistently give October 13.) in Pawhuska, Oklahoma to Jennie (He-kin-to-op-pe) and Clarence Gray. She was the youngest of five living sisters, Mary, Anna, Genevieve and Emma Louise and had two younger brothers Andrew and Clarence Jr. Her mother died in 1923 at the time that her youngest brother was born. Gray attended the public school in Pawhuska Indian Village until the 8th grade and then attended the St. Louis Boarding School, a girls academy operated south of Pawhuska by the Bureau of Catholic Indian Missions to educate Osage girls. Her father died when she was fifteen and her sister Genevieve took care of her and her younger brothers.

After graduating from Nelagoney High School, Gray transferred to the Loretto College in Webster Groves, Missouri. The school was run by the same order as the nuns who had operated her boarding school and Gray was the first full-blooded Native American girl to attend the school. After one year, she returned home to Oklahoma and enrolled in Oklahoma Agricultural and Mechanical College in Stillwater, Oklahoma, but found the school too large and unfamiliar. She left fairly quickly and instead enrolled at Northeastern Teacher's College in Tahlequah, where she completed her education with a teaching degree.

== Career ==
In 1937, Gray married Frank C. Robinson, a fellow teacher, who was not of Native heritage. After their marriage, Robinson took three summer courses at the State Normal School of Colorado in Greeley. She became a teacher of history and physical education at Coweta High School, where she also coached the girls' basketball team. The couple subsequently had two children, Janelle and Keith and in her spare time, she began doing craftwork, focusing on traditional Osage ribbonwork, inspired to create clothing for her children to wear in ceremonial dances. When she began working with ribbons in the early 1950s, Robinson realized only three Osage artisans Harriet Chadlin, Martha Gray, and Josephine Jack still knew how to produce the work. In an effort to preserve the tradition, Robinson began researching patterns and techniques by studying old photographs and garments at the Osage Museum. Though she knew how to sew, having had training at the St. Louis Boarding School, Robinson had to learn how to work with ribbons through trial and error. She began collecting tribal dresses from a wide variety of tribes including Apache, Delaware, Cherokee, Cheyenne, Gros Ventre, Kickapoo, Kiowa, Pawnee and Seminole, among others. Perfecting her art, she and her sisters filed for a trademark, "Ribbonwork, A Specialty" and began taking custom orders for garments, typically worn for social events or on ceremonial occasions.

In 1958, Robinson, along with her sisters Genevieve Tomey and Louise Red Corn, opened the Redman Store in Pawhuska to sell their ribbon appliqué work. Around the same time, she became active in the National Congress of American Indians (NCAI), attending the 1958 Convention in Missoula, Montana. By 1960, she was acting as recording secretary for NCAI and then in 1966, she became the first woman elected as vice president of the organization. Robinson participated in numerous lobbying commissions and conferences, such as the 1967 conference to improve education for indigenous children hosted by the Society for the Study of Social Problems. The conference brought together Native American leaders and anthropologists, psychologists and sociologists from 13 universities, and officials from the U.S. Bureau of Indian Affairs and Department of Education. In 1967, she instituted an annual style show, for the Indian Trail Festival hosted by the Indian Women's Club of Bartlesville, Oklahoma. The show included not only modeling of garments, but narration of the techniques and materials used to make the item and the symbolism of the motifs incorporated in the design.

Robinson made headlines in 1968, when she served as acting president of NCAI for the 25th Annual Convention in Omaha, Nebraska, where it was noted to be "most unusual for a woman to preside". She had become one of the "most influential Indian women in the country", by 1970. In 1971, she served as president of the Oklahoma Federation of Indian Women and was involved in many issues concerning civil rights for Native Americans, including job opportunities, discrimination and education. As both of her sisters had died by 1972, Robinson devoted more time to the store, until she closed it in February 1979. After its closure, she began teaching ribbonwork techniques and exhibiting her work throughout the country appearing at such venues as the Buffalo Bill Historical Center in Cody, Wyoming; the Folklife Festival of the Smithsonian, and the Wheelwright Museum of the American Indian in Santa Fe, New Mexico. She also conducted demonstrations for the Smithsonian on three separate occasions. In 1982, she was one of the inaugural recipients of the National Endowment for the Arts' National Heritage Fellows, in recognition for her work to preserve the needlework crafts of the Osage heritage.

== Death and legacy ==
Robinson died on September 4, 1985, while attending a craft show in Tipton, Indiana. Her funeral was held on September 9 in Bartlesville, Oklahoma. The Oklahoma Federation of Indian Women gives an annual Humanitarian Award, named in her honor. In 1990, a documentary film, accompanied by a book for use by teachers of the same name, Ribbons of the Osage: The Art and Life of Georgeann Robinson was released. By 1992, the Indian Trail Festival Fashion Show she had initiated included designs by artists from twenty-two different tribes and all monies earned went towards scholarship funds for Native American youth.

In 2016, in honor of the thirty-fourth anniversary of the National Heritage Fellowship, the National Endowment for the Arts commissioned a new fellows' medal. The ribbon for the medal was designed using Robinson's motifs of traditional Osage ribbonwork design and was created by Lisa Powell, Robinson's granddaughter. The medal, which is suspended from the ribbon, was designed by Carlton Simmons, nephew of Philip Simmons, who had also been a recipient of an NEA Fellowship. The new medal was first presented to recipients in 2016, replacing the previous certificates issued. Robinson has works in the permanent collections of the Metropolitan Museum of Art in Manhattan, the Museum of International Folk Art of Santa Fe, New Mexico and in the Southern Plains Indian Museum in Anadarko, Oklahoma.

== See also ==
- List of Native American politicians
- Native American women in politics
