= 2016 Sacramento County Board of Supervisors election =

Local election in California

- June 7 (primary); November 8 (runoff)

2 of 5 seats on Sacramento County Board of Supervisors

The 2016 Sacramento County Board of Supervisors election took place on June 7, 2016, to elect two of the five seats of the Sacramento County Board of Supervisors, with runoffs taking place on November 8, 2016. Runoffs only occur if no candidate receives more than 50% of the votes cast in the contest. Local elections in California are officially nonpartisan. Each supervisor is elected to a four-year term, and does not have any term limits.

== District 3 ==
Incumbent Susan Peters was elected to the 3rd district in 2004, 2008, and 2012. She was eligible for reelection.

=== Endorsements ===
Shaun Dillon

Newspapers

- Sacramento News & Review

=== Results ===
2016 Sacramento County Board of Supervisors 3rd district election
Primary election
Candidate	Votes	%
Susan Peters (incumbent)	44,201	74.1
Shaun Dillon	15,342	25.7
Write-in	110	0.2
Total votes	59,653	100.0

== District 4 ==
Incumbent Roberta MacGlashan was elected to the 4th district in 2004, 2008, and 2012. She was eligible for reelection, but chose not to run.

=== Endorsements ===
Kerri M. Howell

Newspapers

- Sacramento News & Review

=== Results ===
2016 Sacramento County Board of Supervisors 4th district election
Primary election
Candidate	Votes	%
Sue Frost	17,083	29.9
Mike Kozlowski	11,603	20.3
Kerri M. Howell	11,458	20.0
Gary N. Blenner	10,304	18.0
Teresa Stanley	6,632	11.6
Write-in	91	0.2
Total votes	57,171	100.0
General election
Sue Frost	53,851	54.6
Mike Kozlowski	44,581	45.2
Write-in	215	0.2
Total votes	98,647	100.0
