= Janet Catherine Berlo =

American art historian and academic

Janet Catherine Berlo is an American art historian and academic, noted for her publications and research into the visual arts heritage of Native American and pre-Columbian cultures. She has also published and lectured on gender studies, the representation and participation of women in indigenous and visual arts, the history of graphic arts since the mid-19th century, indigenous textile arts, and American quilting history and traditions. In the early portion of her academic career Berlo made notable contributions towards the understanding of the art and iconography of Mesoamerica, in particular that of the Classic-period Teotihuacan civilization. From 2003 to 2021, Berlo held the position of Professor of Art History and Visual and Cultural Studies at the Department of Art and Art History, University of Rochester, New York. She is currently Professor Emerita.

== Education and academic career ==
Berlo attended the University of Massachusetts Amherst, where she obtained a B.A. summa cum laude in 1974. Her postgraduate studies were undertaken at Yale, where she completed a master's degree in art history in 1976, and her Ph.D. in the same subject area was awarded in 1980.

After a semester as an instructor at Yale while completing her PhD, in the 1979–80 academic year Berlo became an assistant professor in the Art Department at the University of Missouri–St. Louis. Excepting some periods of leave and visiting appointments, Berlo remained associated with the UMSL for the next 17 years, reaching associate professor in 1985 and a full professorship in 1990.

In 1997 Berlo left UMSL for the University of Rochester, where for five years she held the positions of Susan B. Anthony Professor of Gender Studies and Professor of Art History. After a semester in 2002 as a visiting professor at Harvard, in 2003 she returned to Rochester as Professor of Art History and Visual and Cultural Studies.

In 2004 Berlo obtained a visiting fellowship at the Clark Art Institute in Williamstown, Massachusetts, to research "19th-century women’s textiles and their place in American culture".

== Publications ==
- Berlo, Janet Catherine; et al. (1998). Native paths: American Indian art from the collection of Charles and Valerie Diker. New York: The Metropolitan Museum of Art. ISBN 9780870998560.
- Berlo, Janet C.; Phillips, Ruth B. (1998). Native North American Art. Oxford: Oxford University Press. ISBN 978-0-19-284218-3. 1998, and later reprints. A second edition was published by Oxford University Press in 2014: Berlo, Janet C.; Phillips, Ruth B. (2014). Native North American Art (2nd ed.). Oxford: Oxford University Press. ISBN 978-0199947546.

== Sources ==
- Avignone, June (March–April 2008). "Wildly enjoying the process". Rochester Review. 70 (4). Rochester, NY: University of Rochester, Office of Public Relations. OCLC 57727904.
- Berlo, Janet Catherine (2007). "Curriculum Vitae" (PDF). Theories and Things: Re-evaluating Material Culture (PDF). University of Rochester, The Humanities Project. Archived from the original (PDF) on 2009-02-12.
- Braswell, Geoffrey E. (2003). "Introduction: Reinterpreting Early Classic Interaction". In Geoffrey E. Braswell (ed.). The Maya and Teotihuacan: Reinterpreting Early Classic Interaction. Austin: University of Texas Press. pp. 1–44. ISBN 0-292-70587-5. OCLC 49936017.
- Cowgill, George (1997). "State and Society at Teotihuacan, Mexico". Annual Review of Anthropology (PDF online reproduction). 26 (1). Palo Alto, CA: Annual Reviews: 129–161. doi:10.1146/annurev.anthro.26.1.129. ISSN 0084-6570. OCLC 202300854.
- Demarest, Arthur A.; Antonia E. Foias (1993). "Mesoamerican Horizons and the Cultural Transformations of Maya Civilization". In Don Stephen Rice (ed.). Latin American horizons: A Symposium at Dumbarton Oaks, 11th and 12th October 1986. Washington, DC: Dumbarton Oaks Research Library and Collection. pp. 147–192. ISBN 0-88402-207-2. OCLC 25872400.
- Paulinyi, Zoltán (2006). "The "Great Goddess" of Teotihuacan: Fiction or Reality?". Ancient Mesoamerica. 17 (1). London and New York: Cambridge University Press: 1–15. doi:10.1017/S0956536106060020. ISSN 0956-5361. OCLC 21544811. S2CID 163124002.
- Sugiyama, Saburo (1998). "Notes I-2: Archaeology and Iconography of Theater-type Censers: Official Military Emblems from the Ciudadela?". In Saburo Sugiyama; Debra Nagao (eds.). Teotihuacan Notes I: Images and Symbols in Social Contexts at Teotihuacan. "Teotihuacan Archaeology and Iconography" advanced seminar, XXIst Maya Meetings at the University of Texas at Austin, held in March, 1997 (Internet Journal for Teotihuacan Archaeology and Iconography ed.). Tempe: Department of Anthropology, Arizona State University. Archived from the original on 2007-04-04.
- "Author, Art Historian Janet Berlo Receives Fellowship to Clark Institute" (Press release). UR Office of Communications. 2004-05-04.
