= Oscar Jacobson =

American painter and museum curator

Oscar Brousse Jacobson
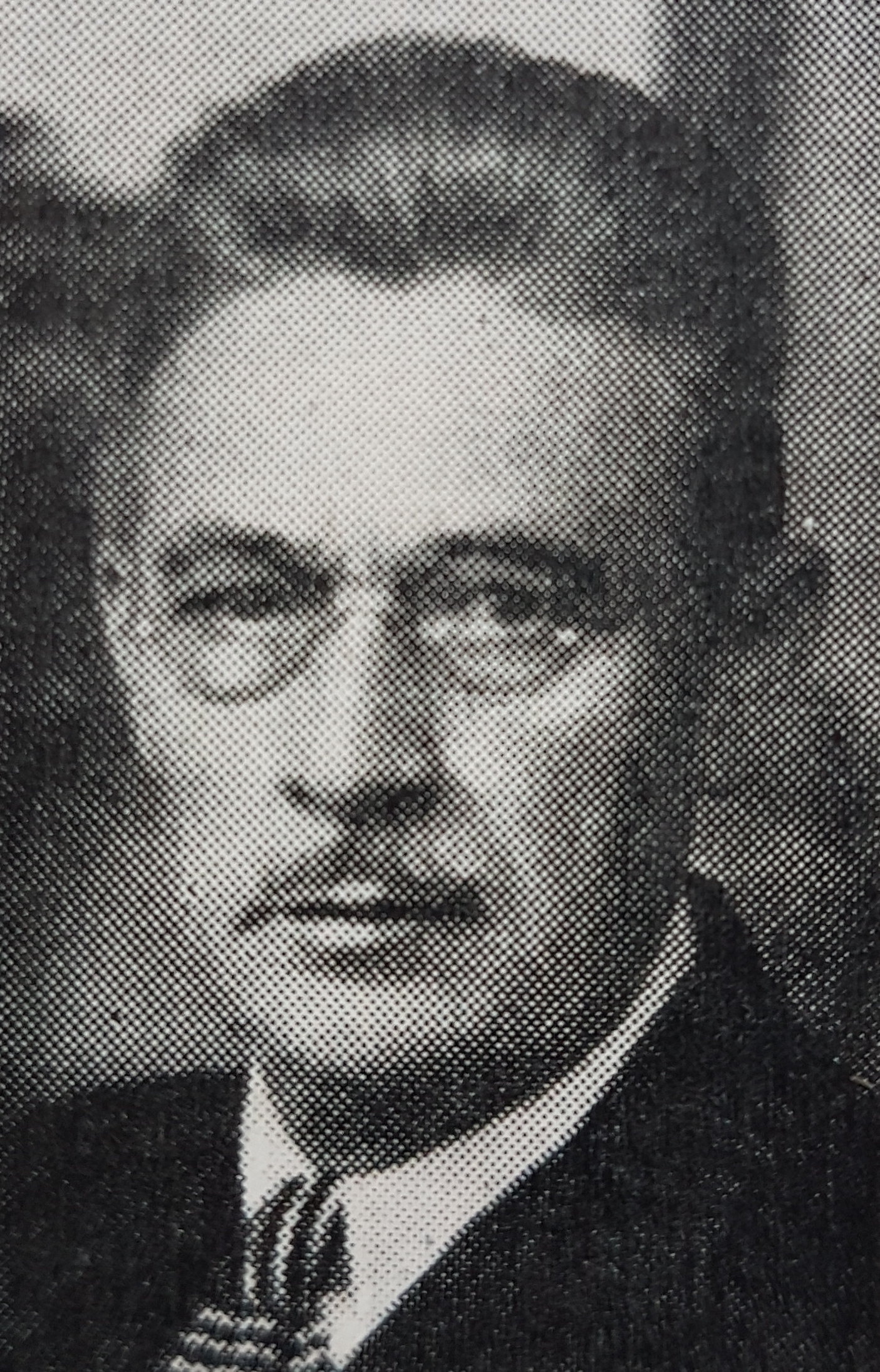
- Born: May 16, 1882; Kalmar County, Sweden
- Died: September 15, 1966 (aged 84); Norman, Oklahoma, U.S.
- Resting place: Norman, Oklahoma
- Education: Bethany College; Yale University
- Occupations: Painter, museum curator
- Employer: University of Oklahoma
- Known for: landscape painting, promoting American Indian modern art
- Spouse: Sophie Brousse (Jeanne d'Ucel)
- Children: 1 son, 2 daughters

Oscar Brousse Jacobson (May 16, 1882 – September 15, 1966) was a Swedish-born American painter and museum curator. From 1915 to 1945, he was the director of the University of Oklahoma's School of Art, later known as the Fred Jones Jr. Museum of Art. He curated exhibitions and wrote books about Native American art.

== Early life ==
Anders Oskar Jacobsson was born on May 16, 1882, on Västra Eknö, an island off the coast of Kalmar County, Småland, Sweden. His mother was Anna Lena Olofsdotter, and his father was Nils Petter Jacobsson. With his parents and siblings, he emigrated to the United States in 1890 and settled in Kansas.

In 1908, Jacobson graduated from Bethany College in Lindsborg, Kansas. He earned a master's degree at Yale University and returned to Bethany College, where he earned a doctoral degree.

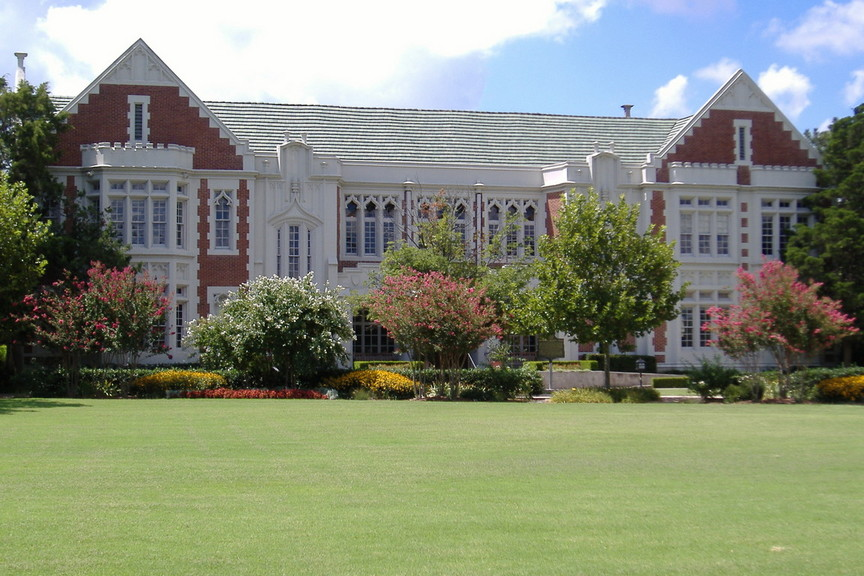
Jacobson Hall, on the University of Oklahoma campus.

== Career ==
Jacobson directed University of Oklahoma's School of Art from 1915 to 1945. He became curator of the University of Oklahoma Museum of Art (now the Fred Jones Jr. Museum of Art) in 1936. With Professor Edith Mahier, he supported Native American artists known as the Kiowa Six. Jacobson was an important figure in the development of Southern Plains, Oklahoma, or Kiowa Flatstyle painting. His notable students included Kiowa Six artists (Stephen Mopope, Lois Smoky Kaulaity, Jack Hokeah, Monroe Tsatoke, Spencer Asah, James Auchiah) as well as Acee Blue Eagle, Woody Crumbo, and William Standing. Jacobson retired as a research professor emeritus of art in 1952.

A nationally known landscape painter and portraiturist, Jacobson completed more than 500 paintings during the course of his career. Most of these sold to private collectors. His artworks were also acquired by the Fred Jones Jr. Museum of Art, the Oklahoma City Museum of Art, and the Woolaroc Museum.

Jacobson founded Association of Oklahoma Artists. The Oklahoma Hall of Fame inducted him in 1949.

== Personal life ==
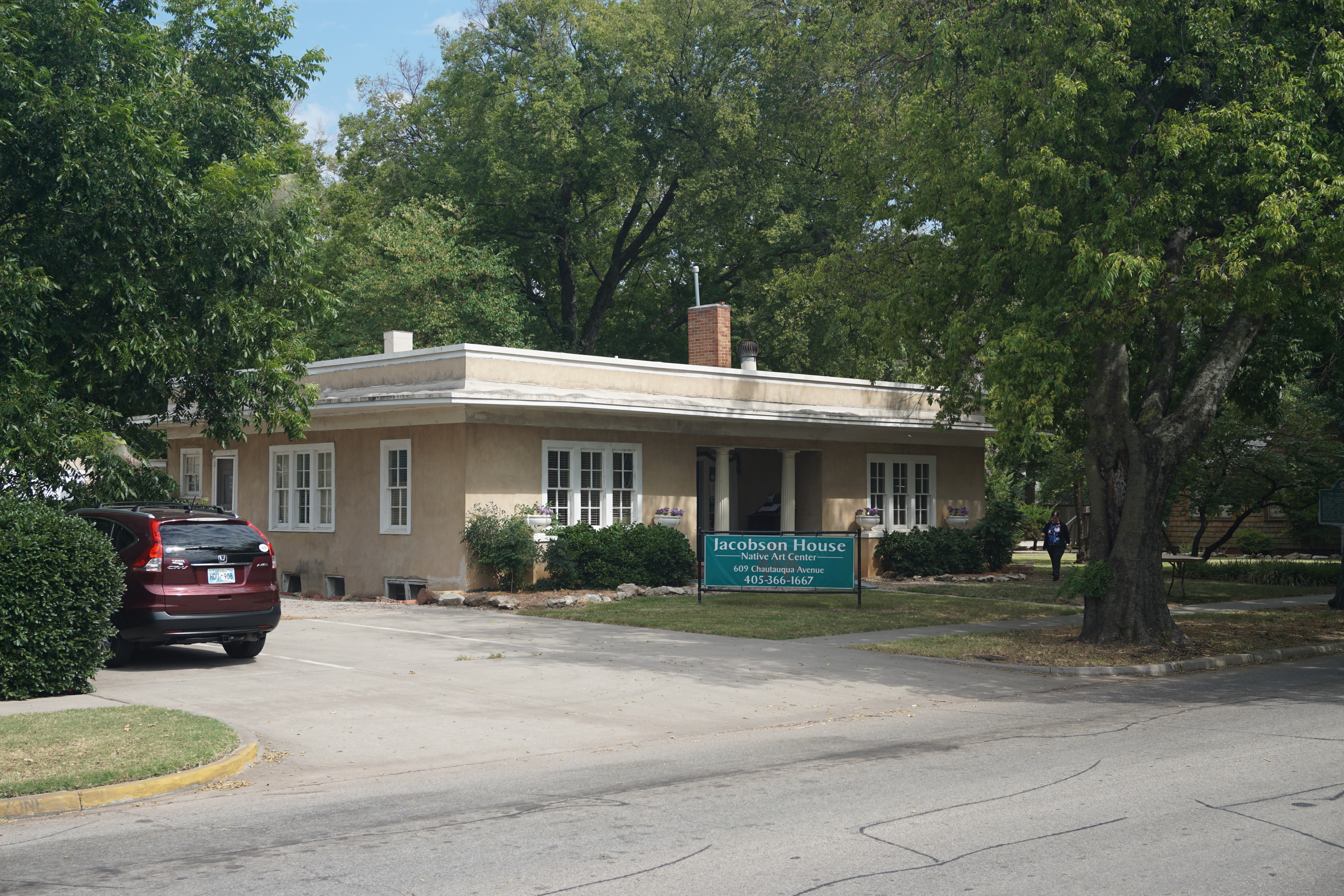
The Oscar B. Jacobson House in Norman, Oklahoma

Jacobson married Sophie Brousse, a French-born art historian, whose pen name was Jeanne d'Ucel. They had a son and two daughters. They resided at the Oscar B. Jacobson House in Norman, Oklahoma, now listed on the National Register of Historic Places.

== Death and legacy ==
In 1952, Jacobson Hall on the University of Oklahoma campus was named in his honor.

Jacobson died on September 15, 1966, in Norman. His funeral was held at the First Presbyterian Church in Norman.

The University of Oklahoma's art museum was renamed the Fred Jones Jr. Museum of Art in 1992. Jacobson's work was featured at "The Art of Oklahoma" exhibition at the Oklahoma City Museum of Art in 2017.

== Sources ==
- Fur, Gunlög (2019). Painting Culture, Painting Nature: Stephen Mopope, Oscar Jaconson, and the Development of Indian Art in Oklahoma. Norman: University of Oklahoma. ISBN 9780806163468.
