= Saddle Mountain, Oklahoma =

- Unincorporated community
- Location within Oklahoma and the United States Saddle Mountain (the United States)
- Coordinates: 34°52′11″N 98°42′26″W
- Country: United States
- State: Oklahoma
- County: Kiowa
- Time zone: UTC-6 (Central (CST))
  - Summer (DST): UTC-5 (CDT)
- GNIS feature ID: 1097566

Saddle Mountain is an unincorporated community in Kiowa County, Oklahoma, United States, along State Highway 115. The Saddle Mountain Post Office existed from January 2, 1902, until May 31, 1955. It was named for the Saddle Mountain Baptist Mission which opened in 1903. Saddle Mountain, a foothill of the Wichita Mountains lies about a mile to the southeast in Comanche County.

Monroe Tsatoke, a Kiowa artist, was born here in 1904, when it was still part of Oklahoma Territory.

This land was allotted to the Spotted Horse family at the beginning of the 20th century and is said to be worth from $16–20 million.

== Notable people ==
- Isabel Crawford, a Baptist missionary who helped the Kiowa people establish the Saddle Mountain Baptist Mission
- Angela R. Riley, chief justice of Citizen Potawatomi Nation (2010-present)

== Utilities ==
Telephone, Internet, and Digital TV is provided by Hilliary Communications.
