= Ruth Phillips =

Canadian art historian and curator (born 1945)

Ruth B. Phillips
- Born: 1945 (age 80–81)
- Known for: art historian and curator

Academic background
- Education: SOAS University of London
- Thesis: The Sande Society Masks of the Mende of Sierra Leone (1979)

Ruth B. Phillips (born 1945) is a Canadian art historian and curator who specializes in North American aboriginal art. She is an author of numerous books and articles on the subjects of Indigenous studies, anthropology/archaeology, political science, international studies, public policy, Canadian studies, and cultural studies.

== Career ==
Phillips received her doctorate in African art history in 1979 from the University of London at the School of Oriental and African Studies. Her dissertation focused on masquerade performance by Mende women in Sierra Leone. She became a professor at Carleton University in 1979. In 1997, Phillips became a Director of the University of British Columbia Museum of Anthropology in Vancouver, where she, alongside three First Nations partner communities and museum staff, created a successful expansion and renewal plan for a $41 million grant to the Canada Foundation for Innovation, the British Columbia Knowledge Foundation, and the University of British Columbia.

In 2005, Phillips, Heidi Bohaker, First Nations partners, and many other scholars co-founded the Great Lakes Research Alliance for the Study of Aboriginal Arts & Cultures (GRASAC). Phillips organized many grants, and supervised the team of GRASAC research assistants in her time as the director. Phillips holds the Canada Research Chair in Modern Culture at Carleton University.

== Publications ==
- Berlo, Janet Catherine; Phillips, Ruth B. (1998). Native North American Art. Oxford: Oxford University Press. ISBN 0-19-284266-8. (with a second edition in 2015, ISBN 978-0-19-284218-3)
- Phillips, Ruth B. (1995). Representing Woman: Sande Society Masks of the Mende of Sierra Leone. Los Angeles: UCLA Fowler Museum of Cultural History. ISBN 9780930741440. OCLC 32921792.
- Phillips, Ruth B. (1998). Trading Identities: The Souvenir in Native North American Art from the Northeast, 1700–1900. Seattle: University of Washington Press. ISBN 0773518061.
- Phillips, Ruth B.; Steiner, Christopher B., eds. (1999). Unpacking Culture: Arts and Commodities in Colonial and Postcolonial Worlds. Berkeley: University of California Press. ISBN 0520207963.
- Edwards, Elizabeth; Gosden, Chris; Phillips, Ruth B., eds. (2006). Sensible Objects: Colonialism, Museums and Material Culture. Berg. ISBN 9781845203245.
- Phillips, Ruth B. (2011). Museum Pieces: Toward the Indigenization of Canadian Museums. McGill-Queen's/Beaverbrook Canadian Foundation Studies in Art History. Vol. 7. McGill-Queen's University Press. ISBN 9780773539051.
- Coombes, Annie E.; Phillips, Ruth B., eds. (2015). Museum Transformations. The International Handbooks of Museum Studies. Vol. 4. Wiley Blackwell.
- Coombes, Annie E.; Phillips, Ruth B., eds. (2020). Museum Transformations: Decolonization and Democratization. Wiley Blackwell. ISBN 978-1-119-64204-6.
