= Monroe Tsatoke =

Kiowa painter from Oklahoma (1904–1937)

Monroe Tsatoke (1904–1937) was a Kiowa painter and a member of the Kiowa Six from Oklahoma.

== Early life ==
Monroe Tsatoke was born on 29 September 1904 in Oklahoma Territory, near present-day Saddle Mountain, Oklahoma. Tsêñd̶òñk’ì: (Tsatokee), which means "Hunting Horse", was his Kiowa name. His father was also named Tsatokee, and was a Kiowa scout. His grandmother was a European-American captive.

Tsatoke never received art instruction until Susan Peters, the Kiowa agency field matron, arranged for Mrs. Willie Baze Lane, an artist from Chickasha, Oklahoma, to teach painting classes for young Kiowas in Anadarko. Recognizing the talent of some of the young artists, Peters convinced Swedish-American artist, Oscar Jacobson, director of the University of Oklahoma's School of Art, to accept the Kiowa students into a special program at the school, in which they were coached and encouraged by Edith Mahier.

== Kiowa Six ==
The Kiowa Six included six artists: Spencer Asah, James Auchiah, Jack Hokeah, Stephen Mopope, Lois Smoky Kaulaity, and Monroe Tsatoke. James Auchiah was the last to join the group at OU in 1926.

The Kiowa Six's first major breakthrough into the international fine arts world occurred at the 1928 First International Art Exposition in Prague, Czechoslovakia. Dr. Jacobson arranged for their work to be shown in several other countries and for Kiowa Art, a portfolio of pochoir print artists' paintings, to be published in France.

== Individual pursuits ==
Tsatoke took additional art classes at Bacone College and worked at Indian City USA in Anadarko as a guide.

In 1924, Tsatoke married Martha Koomsa. The couple had four children; Jewell, Lee Monette, Ross Maker, and John Thomas. Lee Tsatoke also became a respected Kiowa artist. Monroe and Martha lived in Red Rock, Oklahoma. Besides painting, Tsatoke also farmed, sang at Kiowa ceremonials and participated in fancy war dance.

Tsatoke was diagnosed with tuberculosis and joined the Native American Church. He painted about his religious experiences and is credited with creating stylized representations of symbols associated with the Church, such as the water, birds, and feathers.

== Public collections ==
Tsatoke's work can be found in the following public art collections:

- Anadarko City Museum
- Cleveland Museum of Art
- Chisholm Trail Heritage Center, Duncan, OK
- Fred Jones Jr. Museum of Art
- The George Gustav Heye Center
- Gilcrease Museum
- Museum of the Great Plains
- Heard Museum
- Indian Arts and Crafts Board, US Department of the Interior
- Joslyn Art Museum
- McNay Art Museum
- Museum of Northern Arizona, Katherine Harvey Collection
- Museum of New Mexico
- Millicent Rogers Museum
- Oklahoma Historical Society
- Oklahoma Museum of Natural History
- Philbrook Museum of Art
- Seminole Public Library
- Woolaroc Museum

== Death ==
In 1934, the Oklahoma Historical Society commissioned Tsatoke to paint several murals. Although ill with tuberculosis, he worked on the murals until his death. Tsatoke died on 3 February 1937 from tuberculosis at the age of 32 years.
