= Kiowa Six =

Group of artists from Oklahoma, US

The Kiowa Six, previously known as the Kiowa Five, is a group of six Kiowa artists from Oklahoma in the early 20th century, working in the "Kiowa style". The artists were Spencer Asah, James Auchiah, Jack Hokeah, Stephen Mopope, Monroe Tsatoke and Lois Smoky.

== Background ==
Stephen Mopope (1898–1974), the oldest in the group, was born on the Kiowa Reservation in Oklahoma Territory. His relatives, including his great-uncles Silver Horn and Fort Marion ledger artist Ohettoint, recognized his artistic talent at an early age and taught him traditional Kiowa painting techniques.

Jack Hokeah (ca. 1900/2-1969) was orphaned at a young age and raised by his grandmother. Later in life, San Ildefonso Pueblo potter Maria Martinez adopted him as a son and he lived with her family for a decade in New Mexico.

Monroe Tsatoke (1904–1937) was born near Saddle Mountain, Oklahoma. His father Tsatokee ("Hunting Horse") was his first artistic influence.

James Auchiah (1906–1974) was born near present-day Medicine Park, Oklahoma. His grandfather was Red Tipi, a ledger artist, medicine man, and bundle keeper.

Spencer Asah (ca. 1905/1910-1954) was born in Carnegie, Oklahoma. His father, a buffalo medicine man, provided Asah with the traditional cultural background to inspire his art.

Lois Smoky (1907–1981), born near Anadarko, was the youngest of the group and the only woman.

=== St. Patrick's Mission School ===
Five of the artists attended the St. Patrick's Mission School in Anadarko, serving Kiowa, Comanche and Apache children. Operating from 1872 to 1996, the school, also known as the Anadarko Boarding School, was the longest surviving of the seven schools for Native American children in Oklahoma operated by St. Patrick's Mission. There, the five Kiowa artists received formal art instruction from a Choctaw nun, Sister Mary Olivia Taylor (1872–1931).

Monroe Tsatoke did not attend St. Patrick's and did not receive formal art training until the Anadarko Agency field matron, Susan Peters, took an interest in the young Kiowa artists and established an art club. Peters arranged for Mrs. Willie Baze Lane of Chickasha, Oklahoma, to give them painting lessons.

=== University of Oklahoma ===
Susie Peters, while working at the Indian Agency, encouraged Oscar Jacobson, the director of the University of Oklahoma's art department to create a special program for the Kiowa artists. In 1926, Asah, Hokeah, Tsatoke, and Mopope moved to Norman, Oklahoma. They were soon joined by Lois Smoky in 1927 and lived together in a house rented by Lois Smoky's parents.

Jacobson provided studio space for the group, but felt that he did not want to interfere with the direction their painting was taking. Dr. Edith Mahler, an art professor at OU provided painting instruction and critiques. In the fall of 1927, James Auchiah joined the program at OU.

Lois Smoky returned home in 1927, leaving the program. She married and was devoted to her family. Although she did not continue painting, she became a beadwork artist. Since her paintings are the rarest, they have become the most collectible of the group.

== Art career ==
While Jacobson did not wish to dictate subject matter to the six artists, he actively promoted their work. He arranged for their work to be shown at the Denver Art Museum. In 1928, Jacobson entered their watercolor paintings in the 6th International Congress for Art Education, Drawing, and Applied Arts in Prague, Czechoslovakia, where they received international acclaim. Their work continued to be exhibited throughout Europe. In 1929, Jacobson collaborated with a French printer to produce Kiowa Art, a portfolio of 24 pochoir prints of paintings by Asah, Hokeah, Tsatoke, Mopope, and Smoky of intertribal dancers, ceremonies, musicians, and Kiowa daily life.

When they participated in the 1932 Venice Biennale, their exhibit "was acclaimed the most popular exhibit among all the rich and varied displays assembled."

The Kiowa Six are considered significant in the development of Native American painting by bridging the era of Ledger Art to flat-style Southern Plains painting. While not the first Native Americans to be successful in the international mainstream art world, their careers proved inspirational to many Native artists in the 20th century.

== Artwork ==
Inspired by the narrative, representational qualities of Plains hide painting and ledger art, the Kiowa Six created a new style of painting that portrayed ceremonial and social scenes of Kiowa life and stories from oral history, which is characterized by solid color fields, minimal backgrounds, a flat perspective, and emphasis on details of dance regalia.

== See also ==
- Native American art
- List of indigenous artists of the Americas
- Timeline of Native American art history
- Bacone school

== Bibliography ==
- Dunn, Dorothy. American Indian Painting of the Southwest and Plains Areas. Albuquerque: University of New Mexico Press, 1968. ASIN B000X7A1T0.
- Lester, Patrick D. The Biographical Directory of Native American Painters. Norman: University of Oklahoma Press, 1995. ISBN 0-8061-9936-9.
- Swan, Daniel C. Peyote Religious Art: Symbols and Faith and Belief. Jackson: University of Mississippi Press, 1999. ISBN 1-57806-096-6.
- Wyckoff, Lydia L., ed. Visions and Voices: Native American Painting from the Philbrook Museum of Art. Tulsa, OK: Philbrook Museum of Art, 1996. ISBN 0-86659-013-7.
