= Fort Cobb, Oklahoma =

Town in Oklahoma, US

- Town
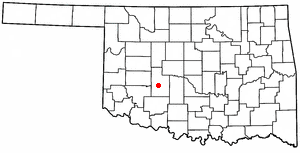
- Location of Fort Cobb, Oklahoma
- Coordinates: 35°06′35″N 98°26′42″W
- Country: United States
- State: Oklahoma
- County: Caddo

Area
  - Total: 0.72 sq mi (1.87 km^{2})
  - Land: 0.71 sq mi (1.84 km^{2})
  - Water: 0.0077 sq mi (0.02 km^{2})
- Elevation: 1,345 ft (410 m)

Population (2020)
  - Total: 518
  - Density: 727/sq mi (280.8/km^{2})
- Time zone: UTC−6 (Central (CST))
  - Summer (DST): UTC−5 (CDT)
- ZIP code: 73038
- Area code: 405/572
- FIPS code: 40-27100
- GNIS feature ID: 2412638
- Website: https://fortcobb.org/

Fort Cobb is a town in Caddo County, Oklahoma, United States. The population was 518 at the 2020 census.

== History ==
Fort Cobb was established as a U.S. Army frontier post in Indian Territory on October 1, 1859, 1 mile (1.6 km) east of the present location of the town. The fort was named after Secretary of the Treasury Howell Cobb, a friend of the founding officer, Major William Emory. The post was later occupied by both Southern and Northern forces during the Civil War, the Union taking control of the fort as part of the 1862 Tonkawa massacre.

Later, Lieutenant Colonel George Armstrong Custer's command was encamped at Fort Cobb from December 18, 1868, to January 6, 1869. Shortly after that, on March 12, 1869, the fort was abandoned in favor of a location 30 miles (48 km) to the south near the Wichita Mountains, and renamed Fort Sill.

The town of Fort Cobb was founded in 1899, and simply named Cobb, which was renamed Fort Cobb in 1902 to honor the defunct military post. At statehood in 1907, the town had 467 residents. The number had fallen to 382 at the 1910 census, but grew to 546 in 1920. The largest number of residents was 827 in 1930, but the population soon began a decline because of the Great Depression and World War II. In 1940 it was 699, falling to 665 in 1950. It rebounded to 687 in 1960, 722 in 1970 and 760 in 1980. There was another drop to 663 in 1990, followed by a rise to 663 in 1990 and 667 in 2000, before declining again to 634 in 2010 and 518 in 2020.

== Geography ==
Fort Cobb is located west of the center of Caddo County in the valley of the Washita River. Oklahoma State Highway 9 passes through the town, leading east 15 miles (24 km) to Anadarko, the county seat, and west 11 miles (18 km) to Carnegie.

According to the United States Census Bureau, Fort Cobb has a total area of 0.54 square miles (1.4 km^{2}), of which 0.01 square miles (0.02 km^{2}), or 1.57% of the town's area, is water.

== Demographics ==
Historical population
Census	Pop.	Note	%±
1910	382		—
1920	546		42.9%
1930	827		51.5%
1940	699		−15.5%
1950	665		−4.9%
1960	687		3.3%
1970	722		5.1%
1980	760		5.3%
1990	663		−12.8%
2000	667		0.6%
2010	634		−4.9%
2020	518		−18.3%
U.S. Decennial Census

=== 2020 census ===
As of the 2020 census, Fort Cobb had a population of 518. The median age was 39.8 years. 24.3% of residents were under the age of 18 and 19.7% of residents were 65 years of age or older. For every 100 females there were 95.5 males, and for every 100 females age 18 and over there were 96.0 males age 18 and over.

0.0% of residents lived in urban areas, while 100.0% lived in rural areas.

There were 223 households in Fort Cobb, of which 34.1% had children under the age of 18 living in them. Of all households, 43.9% were married-couple households, 21.5% were households with a male householder and no spouse or partner present, and 27.8% were households with a female householder and no spouse or partner present. About 28.7% of all households were made up of individuals and 15.7% had someone living alone who was 65 years of age or older.

There were 292 housing units, of which 23.6% were vacant. The homeowner vacancy rate was 0.0% and the rental vacancy rate was 22.0%.

Racial composition as of the 2020 census
Race	Number	Percent
White	374	72.2%
Black or African American	12	2.3%
American Indian and Alaska Native	78	15.1%
Asian	2	0.4%
Native Hawaiian and Other Pacific Islander	1	0.2%
Some other race	4	0.8%
Two or more races	47	9.1%
Hispanic or Latino (of any race)	33	6.4%

=== 2000 census ===
As of the census of 2000, there were 667 people, 270 households, and 189 families residing in the town. The population density was 1,307.1 inhabitants per square mile (504.7/km^{2}). There were 317 housing units at an average density of 621.2 per square mile (239.8/km^{2}). The racial makeup of the town was 77.96% White, 1.20% African American, 16.04% Native American, 0.45% from other races, and 4.35% from two or more races. Hispanic or Latino of any race were 5.25% of the population.

There were 270 households, out of which 35.2% had children under the age of 18 living with them, 55.9% were married couples living together, 11.5% had a female householder with no husband present, and 30.0% were non-families. 28.1% of all households were made up of individuals, and 16.7% had someone living alone who was 65 years of age or older. The average household size was 2.47 and the average family size was 3.05.

In the town, the age distribution of the population shows 28.9% under the age of 18, 7.3% from 18 to 24, 26.7% from 25 to 44, 19.8% from 45 to 64, and 17.2% who were 65 years of age or older. The median age was 37 years. For every 100 females, there were 86.8 males. For every 100 females age 18 and over, there were 74.3 males.

The median income for a household in the town was $25,625, and the median income for a family was $34,000. Males had a median income of $26,786 versus $18,854 for females. The per capita income for the town was $15,085. About 12.5% of families and 17.6% of the population were below the poverty line, including 20.6% of those under age 18 and 17.8% of those age 65 or over.

== Economy ==
During the first half of the 20th century, the local economy largely depended on agriculture. The town had two grain elevators and three cotton gins by 1930, and depended on the Chicago, Rock Island and Pacific Railroad (Rock Island), whose branch line ran between Chickasha and Magnum.

Construction of Fort Cobb Dam and the adjacent park opened the town to tourism as a major economic force in the second half of the century.

== Government ==
The town has a mayor-council form of government.

== Education ==
- Caddo-Kiowa Technology Center

== Media ==
The Fort Cobb News has served the town since 1958. Previous newspapers were: Caddo County Record, the Fort Cobb Express, and the Fort Cobb Record.

== Notable people ==
- Gary Gray, formerly of the NBA's Cincinnati Royals
- Reggie Willits, former member of Major League Baseball's Los Angeles Angels organization
- Wendi Willits (older sibling of Reggie), formerly of the WNBA's Los Angeles Sparks
- Eli Willits (son of Reggie), first overall pick in the 2025 MLB draft by the Washington Nationals
