= Susan Peters (politician) =

American businesswoman and politician

Susan Peters (born in Foothill Farms, California) is a Republican who served on the Sacramento County Board of Supervisors. Supervisor Peters served on the Board from January 4, 2005 until January 4, 2021.

== Background ==
A businesswoman before joining the Board of Supervisors, Supervisor Peters began her career in banking where she served as Assistant Vice President of Wells Fargo Bank and Senior Vice President of Commerce Savings Bank. She later worked at McCuen Properties which was the company of her late husband. She served as treasurer for the company. The company helped with the redeveloping of Sacramento Central Library block, erecting the Ziggurat building in West Sacramento, and managing the successful reuse of Mather Air Force Base into the now thriving Mather Commerce Center.

== Issues ==
While serving on Sacramento Board of Supervisors, Susan Peters voted in favor of a "Physical Contact" ordinance restricting entertainment where a performer is closer than six feet to the audience. Opponents of this ordinance argued that it would be found unconstitutional if challenged. This effectively shut down two topless dancing bars which had been operating in her district for over a decade.

In 2014 the Fair Political Practices Commission began investigating Supervisor Susan Peters after the Sacramento Bee reported on over 51 votes cast by her over nine years related to projects at the former Mather Air Force Base, where she owns office buildings and vacant land. In late 2016 Supervisor Susan Peters and the Fair Political Practices Commission settled the case by admitting to violating state ethics law by voting on the conveyance of land from the US Air Force to Sacramento County and by approving the demolition of blighted buildings near properties she owned, and paying a $9500.00 fine to the Fair Political Practices Commission.

Peters voted against holding night meetings, which some said would have allowed more public scrutiny. She opposed a temporary ban on no-fault evictions in 2019. At the beginning of the COVID-19 pandemic, she voted against a temporary eviction ban to protect people who lost their jobs because of COVID-19.

== The District ==
District 3 comprises mostly unincorporated area, including Arden- Arcade, Carmichael, Fair Oaks, Foothill Farms, College Glen, North Highlands, as well as East Sacramento from the American River to Alhambra Boulevard.

== Awards ==
On January 7, 2011, Susan Peters was named the 2011 Person of the Year by the Carmichael Chamber of Commerce. During the awards event Peters administered the oath of office to the incoming members of the Carmichael Chamber of Commerce Board.

Political offices
Preceded by Muriel P. Johnson	Sacramento County Supervisor, 3rd District; 2005–2021	Succeeded by Rich Desmond
