= Carnegie, Oklahoma =

Town in Oklahoma, US

- Town
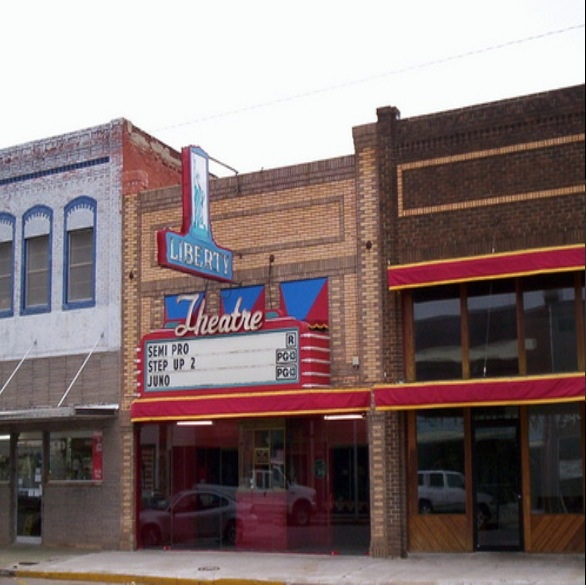
- The Carnegie Liberty Theatre in Carnegie

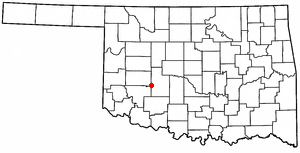
- Location of Carnegie, Oklahoma
- Coordinates: 35°06′10″N 98°35′59″W
- Country: United States
- State: Oklahoma
- County: Caddo
- Town founded: 1903

Government
  - Town Board of Trustees: Mayor; Cody Dupler; Vice-Mayor; Sandy Settle; Members; Delores Bartosovsky; Don Topfi
  - Other city officials: Town Clerk; Carla Nesbitt; Town Treasurer; Margaret Settle; Town Judge; Jim Hines

Area
  - Total: 1.33 sq mi (3.45 km^{2})
  - Land: 1.33 sq mi (3.45 km^{2})
  - Water: 0 sq mi (0.00 km^{2})
- Elevation: 1,339 ft (408 m)

Population (2020)
  - Total: 1,430
  - Density: 1,073.0/sq mi (414.28/km^{2})
- Time zone: UTC-6 (Central (CST))
  - Summer (DST): UTC-5 (CDT)
- ZIP code: 73015
- Area code: 580
- FIPS code: 40-12050
- GNIS feature ID: 2413171
- Website: Town website

Carnegie is a town in Caddo County, Oklahoma, United States. The population was 1,430 as of the 2020 United States census.

== History and culture ==
Carnegie was named after the famous Scottish American industrialist and philanthropist, Andrew Carnegie. The town's original name was Latham. It was originally platted as North and South Latham, with North Latham being north of the Washita River and South Latham south of it. North Latham was intended to be the commercial hub, with the Chicago, Rock Island and Pacific Railway expected to go along the north side of the river. However, the tracks ended up running along the south bank of the Washita, so South Latham became the commercial hub and North Latham withered and/or was never developed.

Leaders of the town decided shortly after incorporation in 1903 to rename the town Carnegie in the hopes the industrialist would build a library there. (Note: According to the Encyclopedia of Oklahoma History and Culture, the town was renamed in 1901 because there was another community named Latham in Oklahoma Territory. This source also says that Carnegie incorporated in 1906.) Although the town acquired a library, Andrew Carnegie did not provide it. There is unofficially a "Carnegie Hall", known more properly as the Carnegie Memorial Auditorium, where community events are held. While currently on hiatus, for several years there was an annual "Stars of Carnegie Hall" talent show showcasing individuals across the region and state in a local talent show, in which both local and regional talents were represented.

Carnegie High School has won three state titles in boys basketball (1988, 1992, 1996), as well as three titles in girls cross country (2002, 2003, 2004). Carnegie High also won three state titles in boys cross country (1999, 2000, 2020). The Kiowa Tribe of Oklahoma headquarters are located in Carnegie.

== Geography ==
According to the United States Census Bureau, the town has a total area of 1.37 square miles (3.55 km^{2}), all land.

The town is on the south bank of the Washita River, 27 miles (43 km) west of Anadarko, at the intersection of state highways 9 and 58.

=== Climate ===
Climate data for Carnegie, Oklahoma
Month	Jan	Feb	Mar	Apr	May	Jun	Jul	Aug	Sep	Oct	Nov	Dec	Year
Mean daily maximum °F (°C)	49.7 (9.8)	54.9 (12.7)	64.8 (18.2)	74.8 (23.8)	82.3 (27.9)	90.5 (32.5)	96.2 (35.7)	94.9 (34.9)	86.4 (30.2)	76.3 (24.6)	62.4 (16.9)	52.1 (11.2)	73.8 (23.2)
Mean daily minimum °F (°C)	24.0 (−4.4)	29.1 (−1.6)	38.0 (3.3)	48.3 (9.1)	57.3 (14.1)	66.1 (18.9)	70.5 (21.4)	68.8 (20.4)	61.4 (16.3)	49.6 (9.8)	37.8 (3.2)	27.7 (−2.4)	48.2 (9.0)
Average precipitation inches (mm)	0.9 (23)	1.4 (36)	2.0 (51)	2.4 (61)	5.1 (130)	4.0 (100)	2.0 (51)	2.3 (58)	4.0 (100)	2.4 (61)	1.6 (41)	1.1 (28)	29.2 (740)
Source 1: weather.com
Source 2: Weatherbase.com

== Demographics ==
Historical population
Census	Pop.	Note	%±
1910	835		—
1920	1,150		37.7%
1930	2,063		79.4%
1940	1,740		−15.7%
1950	1,719		−1.2%
1960	1,500		−12.7%
1970	1,723		14.9%
1980	2,016		17.0%
1990	1,593		−21.0%
2000	1,637		2.8%
2010	1,723		5.3%
2020	1,430		−17.0%
U.S. Decennial Census

=== 2020 census ===
As of the 2020 census, Carnegie had a population of 1,430. The median age was 40.5 years. 24.9% of residents were under the age of 18 and 22.6% of residents were 65 years of age or older. For every 100 females there were 97.2 males, and for every 100 females age 18 and over there were 89.8 males age 18 and over.

0.0% of residents lived in urban areas, while 100.0% lived in rural areas.

There were 560 households in Carnegie, of which 34.8% had children under the age of 18 living in them. Of all households, 41.4% were married-couple households, 19.6% were households with a male householder and no spouse or partner present, and 33.8% were households with a female householder and no spouse or partner present. About 35.9% of all households were made up of individuals and 21.6% had someone living alone who was 65 years of age or older.

There were 738 housing units, of which 24.1% were vacant. The homeowner vacancy rate was 0.9% and the rental vacancy rate was 16.3%.

Racial composition as of the 2020 census
Race	Number	Percent
White	815	57.0%
Black or African American	4	0.3%
American Indian and Alaska Native	340	23.8%
Asian	0	0.0%
Native Hawaiian and Other Pacific Islander	0	0.0%
Some other race	111	7.8%
Two or more races	160	11.2%
Hispanic or Latino (of any race)	241	16.9%

=== 2000 census ===
As of the census of 2000, there were 1,637 people, 636 households, and 429 families residing in the town. The population density was 1,468 inhabitants per square mile (567/km^{2}). There were 774 housing units at an average density of 694.1 per square mile (268.0/km^{2}). The racial makeup of the town was 64.63% White, 1.22% African American, 23.58% Native American, 8.80% from other races, and 1.77% from two or more races. Hispanic or Latino of any race were 12.28% of the population.

There were 636 households, out of which 31.4% had children under the age of 18 living with them, 48.3% were married couples living together, 15.3% had a female householder with no husband present, and 32.4% were non-families. 30.0% of all households were made up of individuals, and 19.5% had someone living alone who was 65 years of age or older. The average household size was 2.49 and the average family size was 3.10.

In the town, the population was spread out, with 27.4% under the age of 18, 8.0% from 18 to 24, 23.3% from 25 to 44, 20.3% from 45 to 64, and 21.0% who were 65 years of age or older. The median age was 38 years. For every 100 females, there were 88.8 males. For every 100 females age 18 and over, there were 83.8 males.

The median income for a household in the town was $20,987, and the median income for a family was $24,737. Males had a median income of $21,917 versus $14,868 for females. The per capita income for the town was $12,432. About 24.9% of families and 30.5% of the population were below the poverty line, including 42.2% of those under age 18 and 18.6% of those age 65 or over.

== Government ==
Carnegie is governed by a five-member Town Board of Trustees, as authorized by the Oklahoma Constitution. Members are elected at large from within the town limits for four-year terms. Other public officials include a town clerk and a town treasurer.

The Town of Carnegie operates and maintains a solid waste/sanitation service, and also a water and sewer service, operated through the Carnegie Public Works Authority.

The town has a 19-member volunteer fire department.

The Carnegie Tri-County Municipal Hospital Authority owns a critical-access hospital and clinic facility providing residents of the area with primary care, radiology, physical therapy, and medical laboratory services. Limited surgical services are also provided. The Carnegie Tri-County Municipal Hospital has three doctors and one nurse practitioner on staff. The hospital is managed and operated by Carnegie Tri-County Hospital Management, Inc.

The Carnegie Library Board, appointed by the Town Board of Trustees, operates a library facility for area residents, providing internet access and a large collection of books, magazines, and audio books.

== Economy ==
Agriculture has been the basis of Carnegie's economy throughout its history. The main production has been cotton, wheat, broomcorn, cattle, hogs and poultry. Oil production replaced agriculture briefly during the 1970s, but declined in economic importance after 1980.

== Community ==
Carnegie is home to Liberty Theater, the oldest continually operated movie theater in Oklahoma.

Carnegie hosts many community events, including the Carnegie Tri-County Free Fair, the Carnegie Round-Up Club Rodeo, the World Championship Domino Tournament, as well as various other events throughout the year.

Carnegie is also the home of the Kiowa Tribe of Oklahoma, which has tribal offices on the west edge of town.

== Transportation ==
The Town of Carnegie operates and maintains the Carnegie Municipal Airport (Location ID: 86F). There is one asphalt runway, 35/17, 3300 ft long. Refueling services are not available.

== Utilities ==
- Carnegie Public Works Authority provides water, sewer, and sanitation services to the town. The Oklahoma Rural Water District #3 also provides water services to outlying areas around Carnegie.
- Electric service is provided by American Electric Power Public Service Company of Oklahoma.
- Natural Gas service is provided by Oklahoma Natural Gas.
- Local telephone service and fiber-optic internet are provided by Carnegie Telephone Company.
- Digital Cable TV service is provided by Carnegie Cable Company.

== Notable people ==
- Barbara Lawrence (1930–2013), actress, was born in Carnegie.
- John P. Allen (1929), systems ecologist, engineer, metallurgist, adventurer and writer was born and grew up in Carnegie.
