= Gilcrease Museum =

- Gilcrease Museum main entrance
- Former name: Gilcrease Institute
- Established: 1943
- Location: Tulsa, Oklahoma
- Coordinates: 36°10′29″N 96°01′17″W
- Type: Art Museum
- Founder: Thomas Gilcrease
- Owner: City of Tulsa
- Website: gilcrease.org

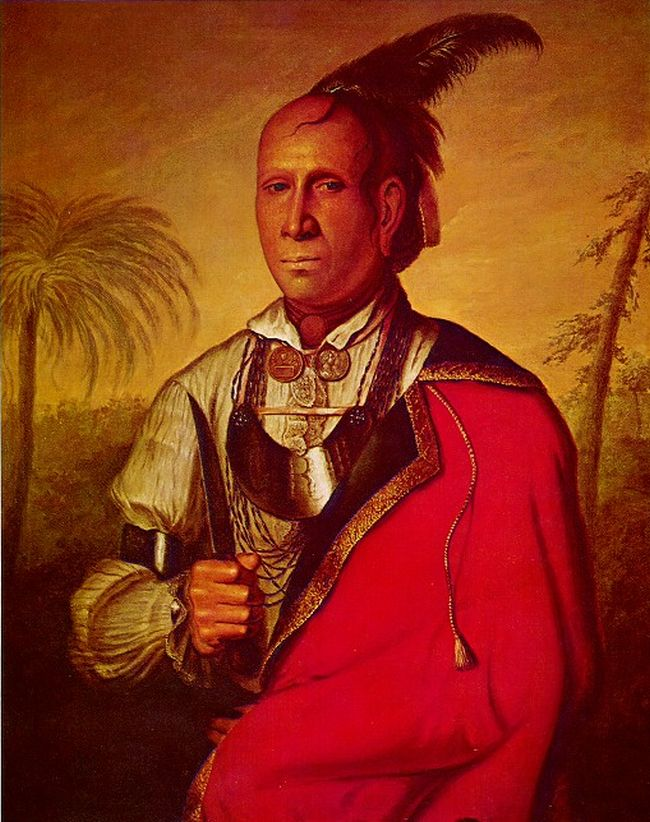
Portrait of Cherokee leader Cunne Shote (1762) by Francis Parsons

Gilcrease Museum, also known as the Thomas Gilcrease Institute of American History and Art, is a museum northwest of downtown Tulsa, Oklahoma housing the world's largest, most comprehensive collection of art of the American West, as well as a growing collection of art and artifacts from Central and South America. The museum is named for Thomas Gilcrease, who was a Muscogee Creek oilman, and founder of the museum. He deeded the collection, as well as the building and property, to the City of Tulsa in 1958. Since July 1, 2008, Gilcrease Museum has been managed by a public-private partnership of the City of Tulsa and the University of Tulsa. The Helmerich Center for American Research at Gilcrease Museum was added in 2014 at a cost of $14 million to provide a secure archival area where researchers can access any of the more than 100,000 books, documents, maps and unpublished materials that have been acquired by the museum.

== History ==
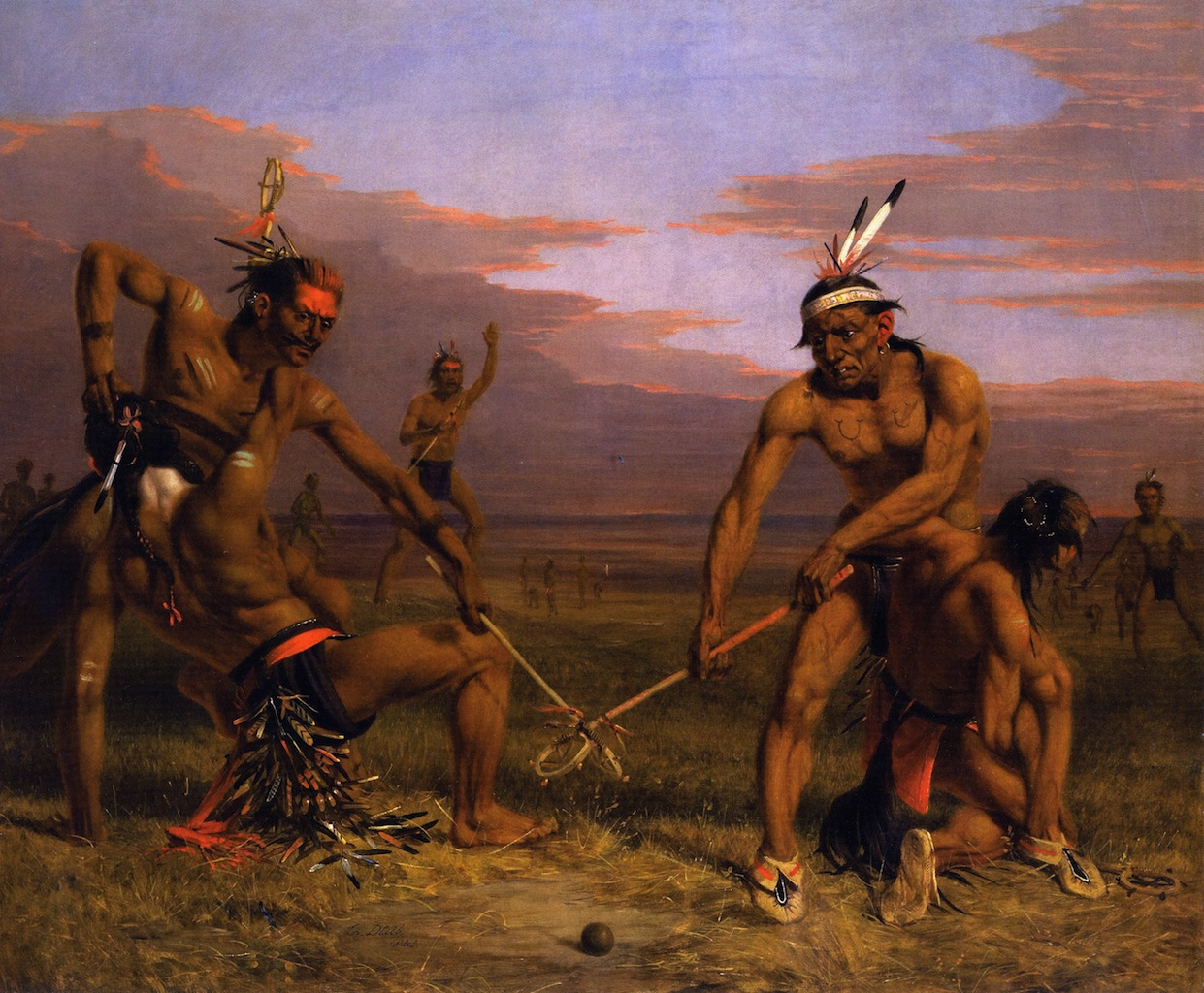
Charles Deas, Sioux playing ball, 1843, oil on canvas

Thomas Gilcrease grew up in the Muscogee (Creek) Nation, in present-day eastern Oklahoma. At the turn of the 20th century the federal government allotted lands collectively held by American Indian tribes to private citizens. His tribal membership entitled him to an allotment of 160 acres (0.65 km^{2}) located just south of Tulsa. The land subsequently became part of one of Oklahoma's first major oil fields, the Glenn Pool Oil Reserve, where the town of Glenpool was later established. Gilcrease proved to be an able businessman. In 1922, he founded the Gilcrease Oil Company, and in less than ten years had greatly expanded his original holdings. Thomas Gilcrease traveled extensively in Europe during the 1920s and 1930s. His visits to European museums inspired him to create his own collection. Pride in his Native American heritage and interest in the history of the American West provided a focus for his collecting.

Gilcrease purchased his first oil painting titled Rural Courtship by Daniel Ridgway Knight in 1912 for $1,500, but most of the collection was amassed after 1939. The first Gilcrease Museum opened at his oil company headquarters (at that time located in San Antonio, Texas) in 1943. Within a few years, he returned to Tulsa with his oil company and his growing collection. He opened a gallery for public viewing on his Tulsa estate in 1949.

Gilcrease collected at a time when few people were interested in the art or history of the American West. This made the scope and speed at which he acquired his collection unique. During the early 1950s, he acquired numerous works of art, artifacts, and documents. Declining oil prices made it difficult for him to finance major purchases. Faced with a seemingly insurmountable debt, Gilcrease offered to sell his entire collection in order to keep it intact. In 1954, fearing that Gilcrease Museum would leave Tulsa, a small group of citizens organized a bond election. The voters of Tulsa approved, by a 3-to-1 margin, the bond issue that paid Gilcrease's outstanding debts. This kept the collection in the city.

Thomas Gilcrease then deeded his collection to the city of Tulsa in 1955. In 1958, the Gilcrease Foundation conveyed the museum buildings and grounds to the city of Tulsa. In addition, Gilcrease committed oil property revenue to Tulsa for assistance in maintaining the museum until the $2.25 million bond was fully repaid. In the years following the transfer of the collection, Thomas Gilcrease continued to fund archaeological excavations and acquire additional materials for the collection. Upon his death in 1962, he bequeathed to the museum the material he had collected during his final years.

Many famous American artists have their work displayed in Gilcrease Museum's American West Gallery. Albert Bierstadt, Frederic Remington, Thomas Moran, and Joseph Henry Sharp are featured prominently. Also on display at the Gilcrease Museum are works by Charles Marion Russell, Alexandre Hogue, and John James Audubon. After his death in 1955, the widow of artist William Robinson Leigh gave his New York studio to the Gilcrease Museum.

Thomas Gilcrease believed that the story of the American West could be told through art and that the history of the Native Americans and his own American Indian heritage could be expressed through painting, sculpture, and other forms of art. He was a patron to a number of Native American artists of his time and purchased more than 500 paintings by 20th-century Native American artists alone.

Currently, the museum owns about 10,000 pieces of art, including 18 of the 22 different bronze sculptures that were created by Frederic Remington.

On July 1, 2008, the University of Tulsa assumed management of the museum through a public-private partnership with the City of Tulsa.

== Anthropology ==
At Gilcrease Museum, the anthropology collections and the work of the department of anthropology focus on the cultural history of North, Central, and South America. The collections comprise 300,000 artifacts, covering prehistoric and historic archaeology and ethnographic materials from Native American, Hispanic, pre-Columbian, and Anglo-American cultural traditions. The ethnographic and historical materials span the period from European exploration of the Americas to the current day.

These distinct materials depict the history of the many peoples and cultures that have made the history and exploration of the new world complex. Especially noteworthy in the archaeological collections at Gilcrease Museum are items from the Mississippi valley region (present-day Illinois and Arkansas), the southwestern U.S. (Colorado, New Mexico, and Arizona), and ancient Mexico. Gilcrease Museum has one of the most significant collections of pre-Columbian projectile points (arrow and spear heads) in North America, and has become a resource that is regularly consulted by archaeologists. The museum also has a research facility containing sliding glass display shelves for artifacts and a computer database system to help find various pieces. This facility, the Kravis Discovery Center, also has numerous "touchable" items for a hands-on experience for its visitors.

In February of 2025, the museum was gifted a substantial collection of Indigenous art from the Alan J. Hirschfield Family Foundation. Hirschfield, raised in Oklahoma, had assembled the collection of almost 300 items, including beadwork, pottery, baskets, and works on paper, from across the U.S. and Canada.

== Archival collection ==
The archival collection at Gilcrease Museum contains over 100,000 books, manuscripts, documents, and maps ranging from 1494 to the present. Items of special interest are: A letter dictated and signed by Diego Columbus in 1512, the Cortez Decree of 1521, copies of the Declaration of Independence and the Articles of Confederation (signed by Benjamin Franklin), and a letter written by Thomas Jefferson dated July 1, 1776. The museum also has a substantial collection of manuscripts by Cherokee principal chief John Ross and Choctaw Chief Peter Pitchlynn.

== Helmerich Center ==
The Helmerich Center for American Research at Gilcrease Museum is an archival center on the museum grounds that permits researchers to access the many rare documents housed at the museum. These items may only be used in the Reading Room, an environmentally controlled, secure area, designed to protect them against loss or damage. (Note: The museum houses approximately 100,000 rare books, documents, maps and unpublished works.) The documents themselves are stored in a hardened concrete structure that was designed to protect them from severe weather events like tornadoes. The secured connector passage between the Reading Room and the document storage area was inspired by the "Vasari Corridor" in Florence, Italy. The same structure that contains the Reading Room also contains the Great Hall, which is used for many purposes, such as fund raising events, conferences, and short-term gallery displays. The center was designed by Hastings & Chivetta, completed in 2014, contains 32,000 square feet (3,000 m^{2}) of space and cost approximately $14 million to construct.

== NAGPRA ==
Gilcrease Museum values and prioritizes relationships with Native Nations by investing in and supporting NAGPRA (The Native American Graves Protection and Repatriation Act) compliance and repatriation efforts and by stewarding its collection with respect, awareness, and humility with guidance from communities. Gilcrease sees this collaborative and community-centric work as an opportunity to deepen and share knowledge and experiences and better care for and respect items, their cultures, and the contemporary peoples who maintain connections to them. Gilcrease Museum submitted an Inventory and Summary, as required, back in the 1990s. Gilcrease’s first repatriation took place in 2006. The second in 2010, and then again in 2016. All of these were reactive to claims the Museum received from those tribes. Since 2016, Gilcrease has maintained a more proactive approach to NAGPRA and actively invites tribes to participate in consultation. Gilcrease is actively consulting with over 75 Native Nations from throughout the United States on the repatriation of ancestral human remains, funerary items, sacred objects, and objects of cultural patrimony.

== Outdoor landscaping ==
Gilcrease is working with Michael Van Valkenburgh, (MVVA) a landscape architect to reimagine the landscape surrounding the museum. The goals of this project are to: 1. orchestrate an arrival experience by creating a welcoming, memorable sequence for vehicles and pedestrians alike. 2. Design pedestrian pathways that are comfortable, intuitive, and experientially rich. 3. Establish a cohesive planting strategy to create a setting that reflects the museum’s character and mission. 4. Respond sensitively to existing site conditions, integrating existing plantings and other site features to create a holistic campus.

== Rebuilding ==
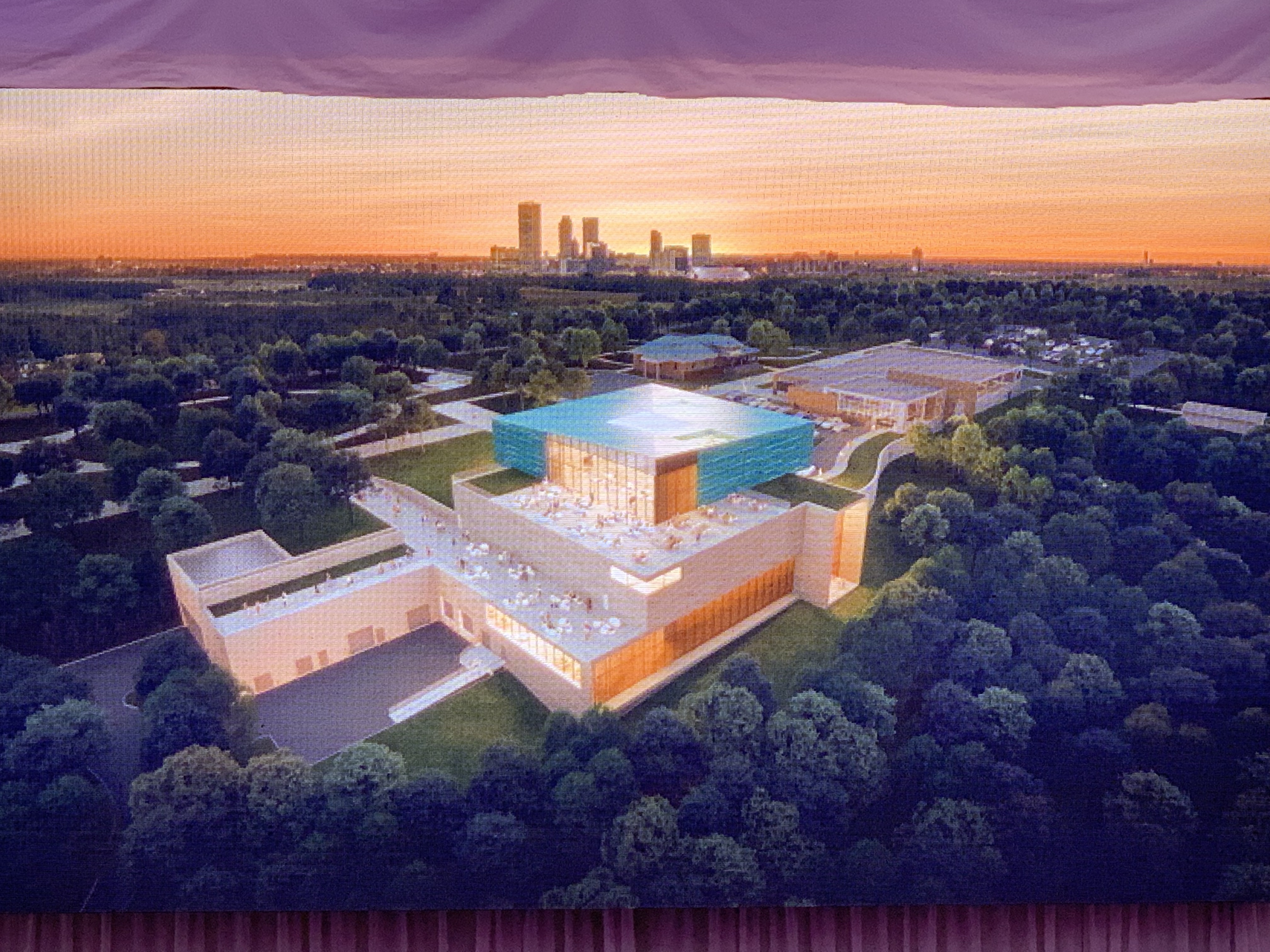
New Gilcrease Museum rendering in Tulsa, OK revealed summer 2021

Voters approved an 0.6 percent sales tax (known as Vision 2025) on April 5, 2016, which proposed to allocate $65 million for a major expansion/improvement program of Gilcrease Museum. However, the project morphed into an $83.6 million plan to build an entirely new museum after it was determined that modifying the existing museum to modern standards would be too expensive. Demolition of the old building and the start of the new began in 2022, with completion projected at that time by early 2025. The new Gilcrease Museum, designed by SmithGroup, is to emphasize sustainability, expanded gallery space, and a stronger connection between indoor exhibits and the surrounding landscape. It is also to incorporate cultural references and improved visitor amenities to create a more inclusive and engaging experience. The Helmerich Center, as well as the Thomas Gilcrease house and the mausoleum on the property, will remain. Ground was broken in April, 2026 on a $3.5 million privately-funded 13-mile hiking and mountain biking trail system on the grounds of the museum and other city land, with completion expected in early 2027. That timing would coincide with the revised anticipated opening of the museum itself, projected to be a $140 million facility by completion.

== Redesign ==
Designed by SmithGroup, the new building subtly reflects Osage culture and the natural world, aligning with the cardinal directions and connecting earth, sky, day, and night. Materials and colors honor Art Deco design and the Thomas Gilcrease home, with local sandstone grounding the structure in Oklahoma’s landscape.

There will be 14 core galleries across two floors, with three changing galleries on the ground floor. The lower level will focus on place and ask the questions: what does it mean to have a relationship to a certain place? How do we understand and visualize the land? How have relationships to land changed over time? This floor will explore different communities’ relationships over time to what is now Oklahoma. It will feature exhibitions focusing on map making, the American Revolution, early cities, the work of NAGPRA, and artists representations of land during the 19th and 20th centuries. A highlight of this section of the museum will be Shoshone Falls by Thomas Moran.

The upper level will focus on “Interactions” and ask the questions: what does it mean to build community? How have communities interacted (for better or worse) with one another? How do we define ourselves in relationship to one another? It will include exhibits on the American west in media, the role visual art played in the myth of the vanishing race of Native Americans, the complex historical relationship between forced removal of the Five Tribes to Indian Territory and black communities in Tulsa, fashion as a form of identity, and visual arts from the 20th and 21st century made by artists who have reclaimed their identity.

As of late September 2026, the opening of the $140.9 million museum and campus redesign was scheduled for March 2027.

== See also ==
- George Catlin
- Thomas Gilcrease
- James Pepper Henry
