= List of Native American firsts =

This is a list of Native American firsts. Native American people were the first people to live in the area that is now known as the United States. This is a chronological list of the first accomplishments that Native Americans have achieved both through their tribal identities and also through the culture of the United States over time. It includes individuals and groups of people who are indigenous to contemporary United States. This includes Native Americans in the United States, which includes American Indians, Alaska Natives, and Native Hawaiians.

== 16th century ==
=== 1530s ===
1539

- Indigenous peoples of Florida have first contact with the Hernando de Soto Expedition, marking first contact with Spaniards and African people for many Indigenous peoples of the Southeastern Woodlands.

=== 1580s ===
1581

- The Navajo make first contact with the Spanish.

1587

- First recorded Protestant christianing of a Native American: Christening of Manteo (Croatan).

== 17th century ==
=== 1610s ===
1615

- First Native American received as royalty by English royalty: Pocahontas (Powhatan).
- The Wendat (Huron) people first act as middlemen for French traders and other Native American tribes.

=== 1620s ===
- First Native American in New England to meet with settlers leading to ratify a peace treaty: Massaoit (Wampanoag).

=== 1630s ===
1638

- First American Indian reservation established: Quinnipiac Nation.

=== 1660s ===
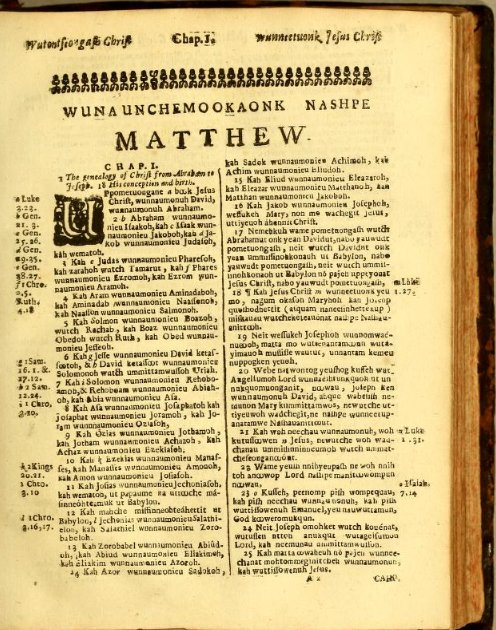
Eliot Indian Bible page

1663

- First published writing by a Native American in the Americas: Honoratissimi Benefactores by Caleb Cheeshahteaumuck (Wampanoag).
- First Bible published in the Americas: The Eliot Indian Bible is printed in Natick and one of the translators, James Printer (Nipmuc) became the first Native American to use a printing press.

1665

- First Native American graduate of Harvard University: Caleb Cheeshahteaumuck (Wampanoag).

=== 1670s ===
1670

- First Native American ordained as a Christian clergy member: Hiacoomes (Wampanoag).

1672

- Native Americans served as first mail couriers between New York City and Albany.

== 18th century ==
=== 1760s ===
1765

- First Native American recorded as preaching Christianity to a non-Native audience: Samson Occom (Mohegan).

=== 1770s ===
1772

- First published literary work by a Native American: A Sermon Preached at the Execution of Moses Paul, an Indian by Samson Occom (Mohegan).

=== 1790s ===
1794

- First Native American published, written report of other Native American peoples in the English language: A Short Narration of My Last Journey to the Western Country by Hendrick Aupaumut (Mohican).

== 19th century ==
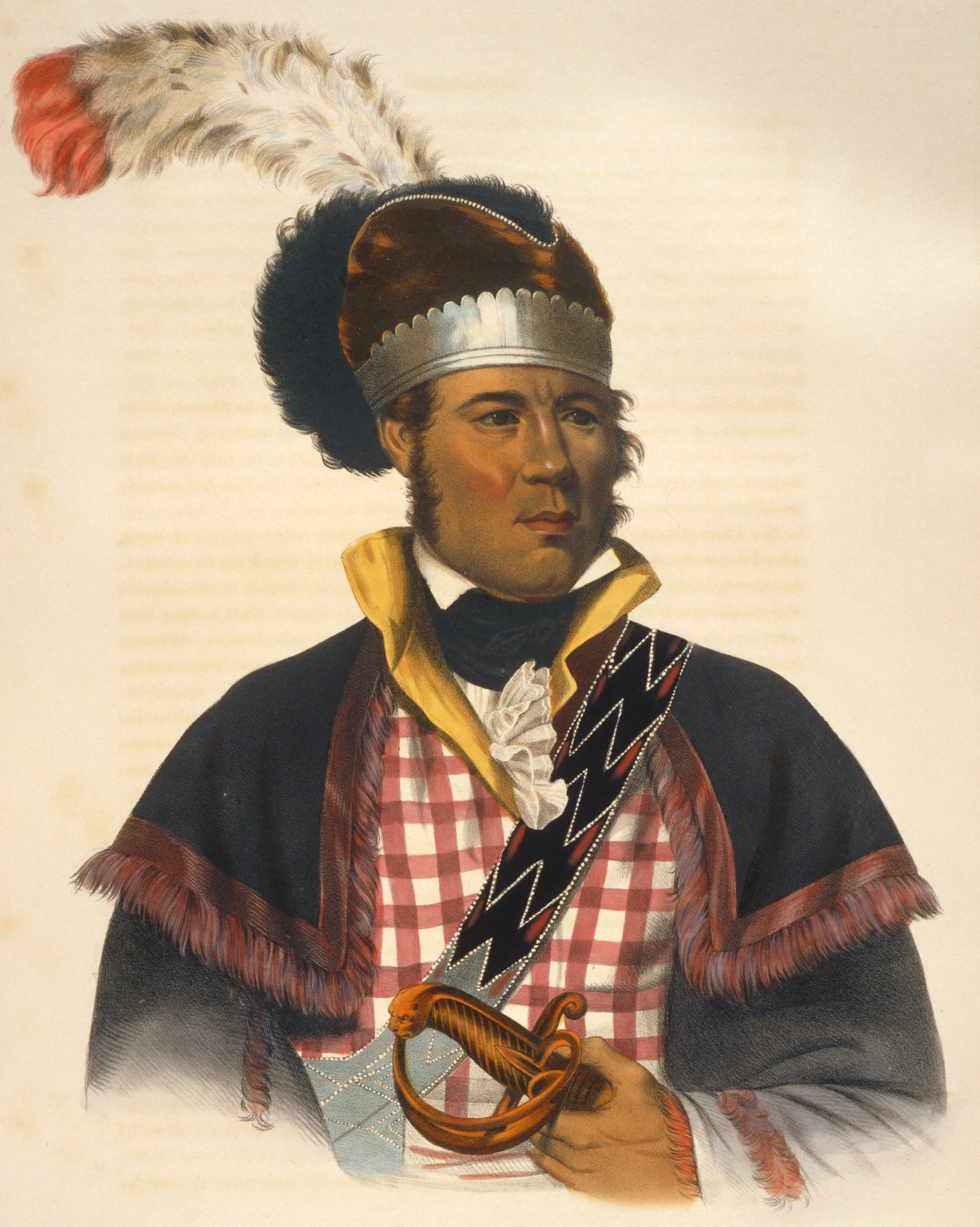
William McIntosh, Muscogee leader

=== 1810s ===
1812

- First Native American commissioned brigadier general in the United States Army: William McIntosh (Muscogee).

=== 1820s ===
1821

- Cherokee syllabary is first adopted by the Cherokee Nation general council: created by Sequoyah (Cherokee, ca. 1770–1843)

1822

- First Native American admitted to West Point and first Native American graduate: David Moniac (Muscogee).

1825

- First Haudenosaunee person to publish the oral histories of the Haudenosaunee: David Cusick (Tuscarora) in Sketches of the Ancient History of the Six Nations.

1827

- The Cherokee Nation adopts its first modern constitution.

1828

- First Native American newspaper and first newspaper published in an Indigenous language: The Cherokee Phoenix. First editor of the paper was Buck Watie (Cherokee).

1829

- First full-length autobiography published by a Native American: A Son of the Forest by William Apess (Pequot).
- First book published using the Cherokee syllabary: Cherokee Hymn Book printed by Elias Boudinot (Cherokee) and a New England missionary.

=== 1840s ===
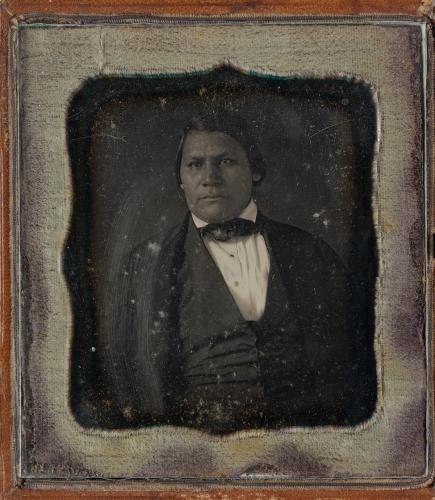
Wa-o-wa-wa-na-onk or Peter Wilson

1844

- First known Native American person to earn a Western medical degree from Western college: Wa-o-wa-wa-na-onk (Cayuga).

1847

- First full-length travelog by a Native American: The Life, History, and Travels of Kah-ge-ga-gah-bowh by George Copway (Ojibwe).

=== 1850s ===
1854

- First novel published by a Native American: The Life and Adventures of Joaquin Murietta by John Rollin Ridge (Cherokee).
- First Native American student periodical publication, A Wreath of Cherokee Rose Buds.

1856

- First governor of the Chickasaw Nation after the adoption of the new constitution: Cyrus Harris (Chickasaw).
- First Native American ordained as a Roman Catholic priest: James Bouchard (Lenape).

1857

- First Native American editor of mainstream newspaper: John Rollin Ridge (Cherokee) who was the founding editor of the Sacramento Bee.

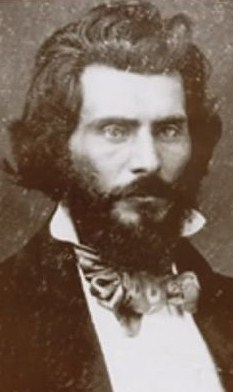
John Rollin Ridge (Cherokee)

=== 1860s ===
1861

- First Native American professional track athlete: Louis "Deerfoot" Bennett (Seneca).

1865

- First person to ride the Chisholm Trail: Jesse Chisholm (Cherokee).

1867

- First Native American to earn the rank of brigadier general in the U.S. Army: Ely Samuel Parker (Seneca).

1869

- First Native American to be awarded the Medal of Honor: Co-Rux-Te-Chod-Ish (Pawnee).
- First Native American to work as the Commissioner for Indian Affairs: Ely Samuel Parker (Seneca).

=== 1870s ===
1870

- First Native American elected as a United States Senator: Hiram Rhodes Revels (Lumbee).

1875

- First independent Cherokee-owned newspaper published: The Indian Progress and owned by Elias C. Boudinot (Cherokee).
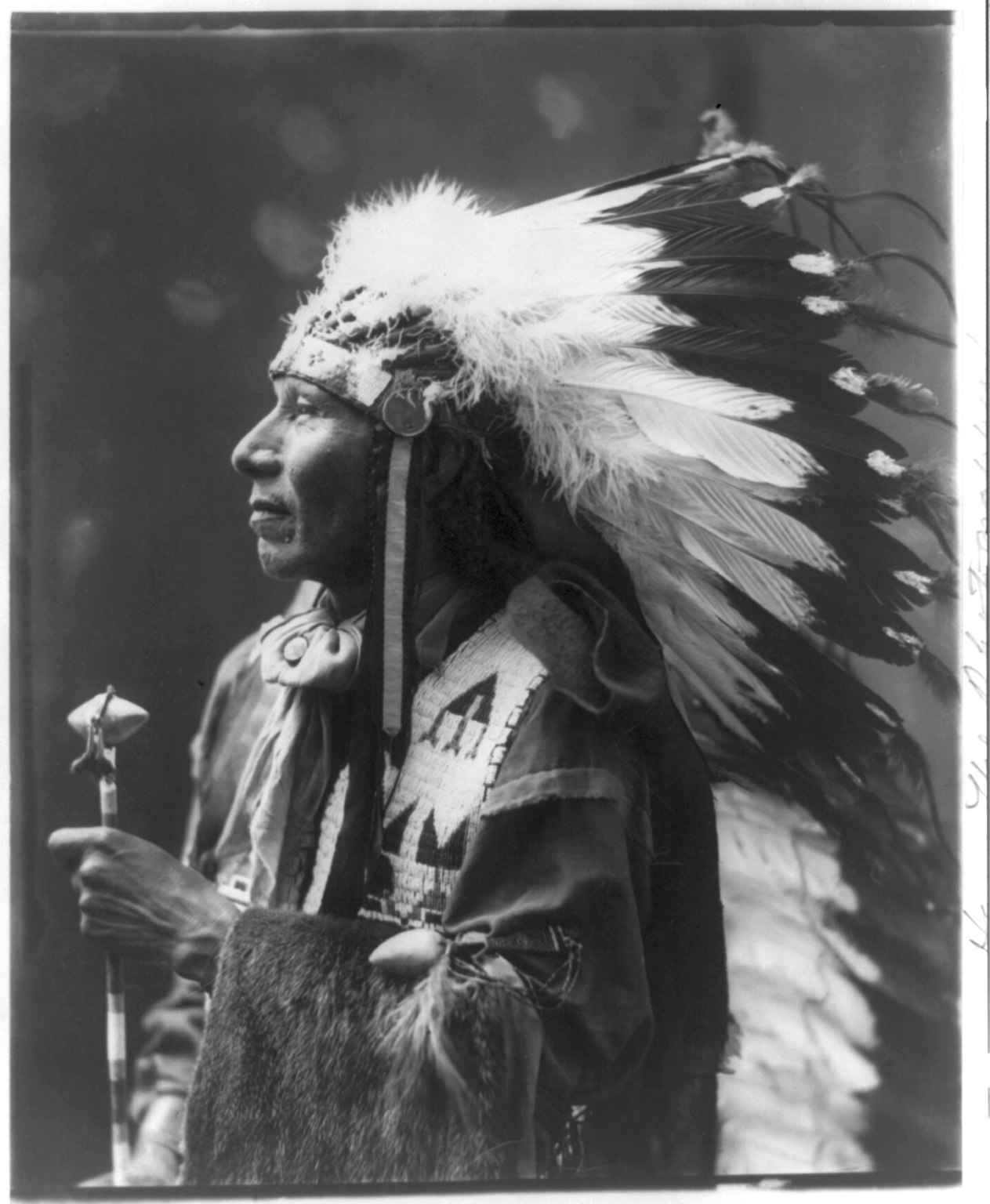
  Standing Bear (Ponca)

1878

- First Choctaw tribal newspaper: The Choctaw News.

1879

- First Native American declared "a person within the meaning of the law" in the United States: Standing Bear (Ponca).

=== 1880s ===
1881

- First Native American anthropologist: Francis La Flesche (Omaha).

1883

- First Native American woman to publish a book, Sarah Winnemucca (Northern Paiute), who published Life Among the Piutes: Their Wrongs and Claims.

1886

- First privately owned Chippewa periodical: The Progress founded by Theodore H. Beaulieu and Gustave Beaulieu (Chippewa/Ojibwe).

1889

- First Native American woman to earn a Western medical degree from a Western college: Susan La Flesche (Omaha).
- First documented Native American U.S. Army nurses: Susan Bordeaux, Ella Clark, Anna B. Pleets, Josephine Two Bears (all Lakota).

=== 1890s ===
1891

- First novel published by a Native American woman: Wynema: A Child of the Forest by Sophia Alice Callahan (Muscogee).

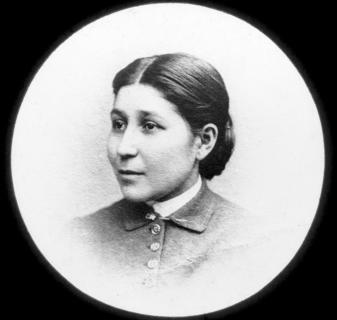
Susan La Flesche Picotte (Omaha)

1892

- First Native American elected to the United States House of Representatives: Charles Curtis (Kaw/Osage/Potawatomi).
- First Native American playwright: Gowongo Mohawk (Seneca), author of Wep-Ton-No-Mah, The Indian Mail Carrier (1892).

1893

- First independent periodical published by and for the Osage people: The Wah-sha-she founded by George E. Tinker (Osage).
- First Native American woman to publish and edit a newspaper: Norma E. Standley Smiser (Choctaw).

1897

- First Native American to play on a major league baseball team: Louis Sockalexis (Penobscot).

1898

- First Native American to graduate from Stanford University: John Milton Oskison (Cherokee).

== 20th century ==
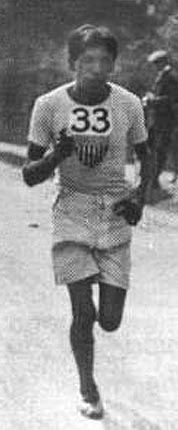
Lewis Tewanima (Hopi)

=== 1900s ===
1902

- First Native American appointed to the office of United States Marshal: Benjamin (Ben) Horace Colbert (Chickasaw Nation).

1903

- First tribal newspaper published by the White Earth Ojibwe: The Tomahawk.

1904

- First Native American to compete for the United States in the Olympic Games: Frank Pierce (Seneca Nation of Indians).

1908

- First tribal newspaper published for the Quileute people: The Quileute Independent created by Webster Hudson (Quileute).
- First paniolos to win at the Frontier Days rodeo competition: Ikua Purdy (Native Hawaiian), Archie Ka'au'a (Native Hawaiian), and Jack Low (Native Hawaiian).

1909

- First Native American film actor: James Young Deer (Nanticoke, 1876–1946).
- First Native American lawyer to argue a case before the Supreme Court: Lyda Conley (Wyandot Nation of Kansas, unrecognized).

=== 1910s ===
1910

- First Native American to graduate from Yale: Henry Roe Cloud (Ho-Chunk).

1911

- First Native American to play in the NFL: Jim Thorpe (Sac & Fox Nation).
- First US national Native American rights and Progressive Era participation organization managed by Native Americans for Native Americans, the Society of American Indians (1911–1923)

1912

- First Native American to win gold medals for the United States in the Olympic Games: Jim Thorpe (Sac & Fox Nation).
- First American to win an Olympic medal (silver) in the 10,000 meter run: Lewis Tewanima (Hopi).

1913

- First Native American to attend the United States Naval Academy: Joseph J. Clark (Cherokee Nation).
- First person documented as having reached the summit of Denali: Walter Harper (Koyukon Athabascan).
- First Native American head coach of a college sports team: Albert Andrew Exendine (Delaware Tribe).

1916

- First American Indian Day celebrated in May 1916. The day was created by Red Fox James (Blackfeet Tribe).

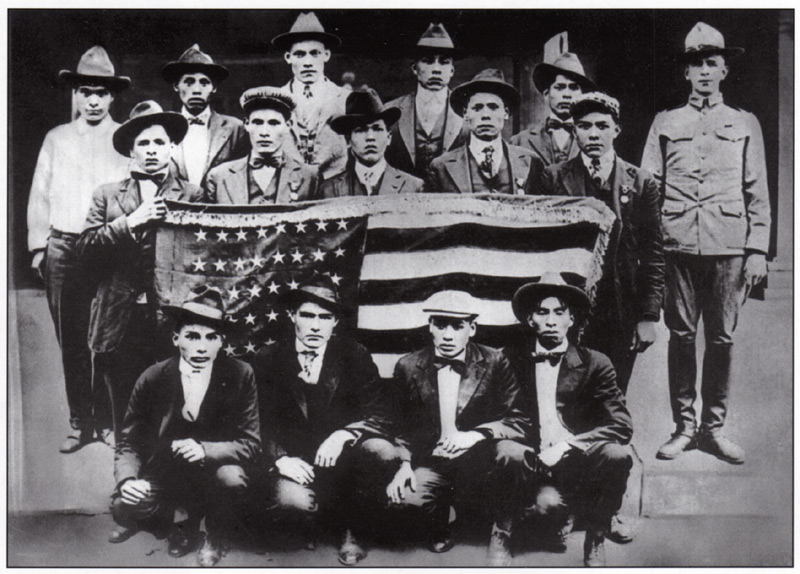
Choctaw Code Talkers in training

1918

- First known use of Indigenous Code Talkers as part of a U.S. military effort: Choctaw, Cherokee, and Navajo were all Code Talkers in World War I.

=== 1920s ===
1921

- First all-Native American National Guard: Haskell unit of the Kansas National Guard.
- First Native American woman pilot: Bessie Coleman (Cherokee descent heritage).

1922

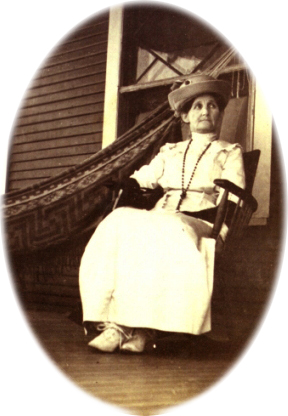
Alice Brown Davis, first woman chief of the Seminole Nation of Oklahoma

- First Native American student recorded to take part in a world conference: Ruth Muskrat Bronson (Cherokee Nation).
- First woman to serve as chief of the Seminole Nation of Oklahoma: Alice Brown Davis (Seminole).

1923

- First chair of the Navajo Tribal Council: Henry Chee Dodge (Navajo).

1924

- First Navajo person to earn a law degree: Thomas Henry Dodge (Navajo).
- First all-Native American cavalry created in the United States: Troop C, 114th Cavalry.
- First Native American to captain the United States Hockey Team: Clarence Abel (Sault Ste. Marie Chippewa).
- First Native American woman elected to a state legislature: Cora Belle Reynolds Anderson (L'Anse Chippewa).
- First Alaska Native elected to the Alaskan Territorial Legislature: William L. Paul (Tlingit).
- First Native American to play in the Winter Olympics, and win a medal in the Winter Olympics (silver medal): Clarence "Taffy" Abel (Sault Ste. Marie Chippewa)

1926

- First United States–born Native American player to become an NHL regular, which he did with the New York Rangers beginning on November 16, 1926: Clarence "Taffy" Abel (Sault Ste. Marie Chippewa).
- First Native American woman to hold state office in Oklahoma: Jessie Elizabeth Randolph Moore (Chickasaw).
- First national reform group with only Native American membership: National Congress of American Indians (NCAI) by Zitkala-Sa (Yankton Dakota) and Raymond Bonnin (Yankton Dakota).

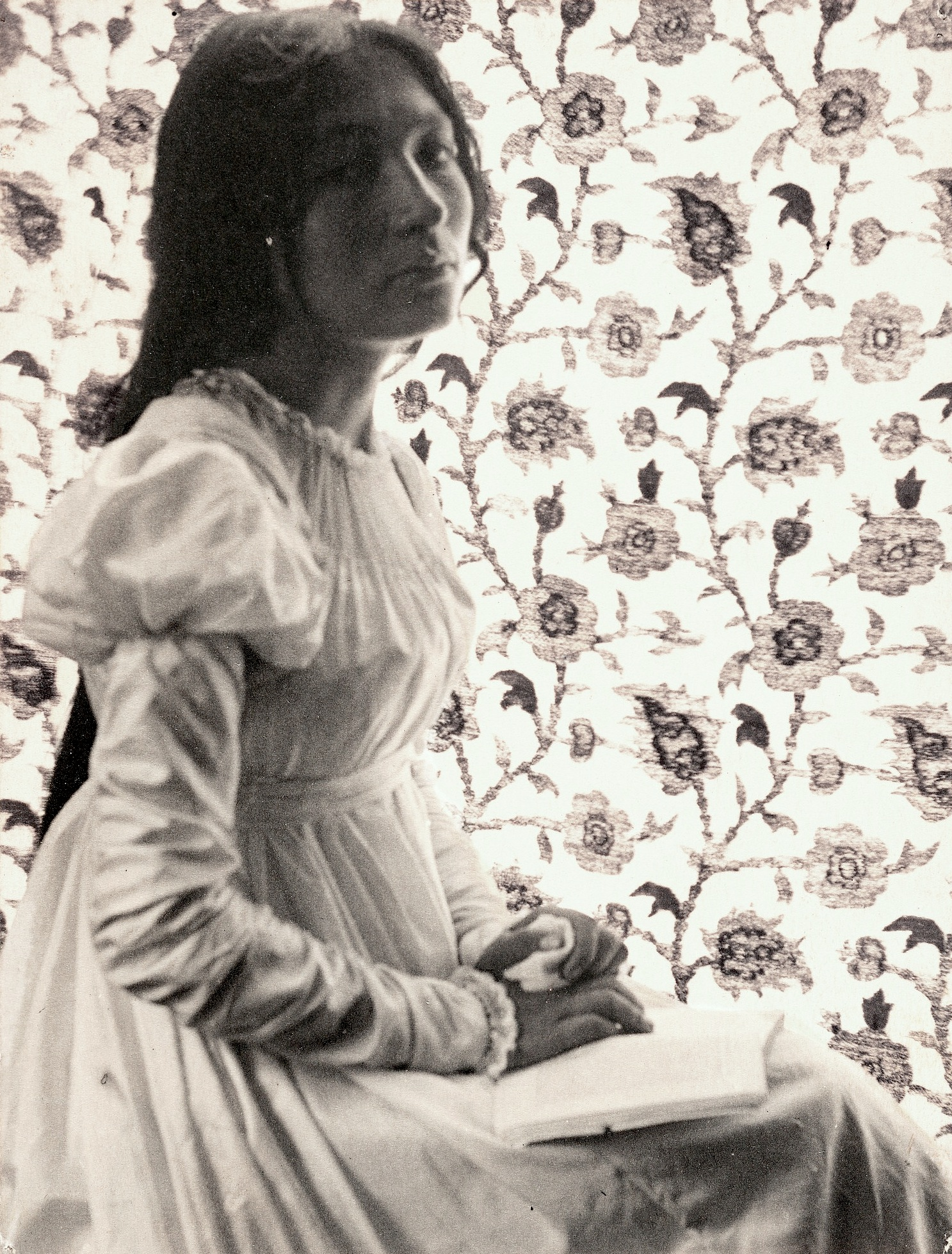
Zitkala Sa (Yankton Dakota) in 1898

1927

- First Native American to earn a degree as a registered nurse: Susie Walking Bear Yellowtail (Crow).

1929

- First Native American to serve as Vice President of the United States: Charles Curtis (Kaw/Osage/Potawatomi).

=== 1930s ===
1930

- First accredited nursing program for Native Americans: Sage Memorial Hospital School of Nursing.
- First enrolled Native American woman to earn a pilot's license: Mary Riddle (Clatsop/Quinault).

1932

- First Native American woman elected to the Montana State Legislature: Dolly Smith Akers (Fort Peck Assiniboine).
- First Native American to open the Olympic Games: Charles Curtis (Kaw/Osage/Potawatomi).

1935

- First Native American woman elected as president of the General Federation of Women's Clubs: Roberta Campbell Lawson (Delaware Tribe).

1939

- First Native American to win national and international level boxing]championships: Chester L. Ellis (Seneca Nation of Indians).

=== 1940s ===
1941

- First Native American commissioned in the American Chaplain Corps: James C. Ottipoby (Comanche).
- First Native American Miss America contestant: Mifauny Shunatona (Otoe/Pawnee), Miss Oklahoma

1942

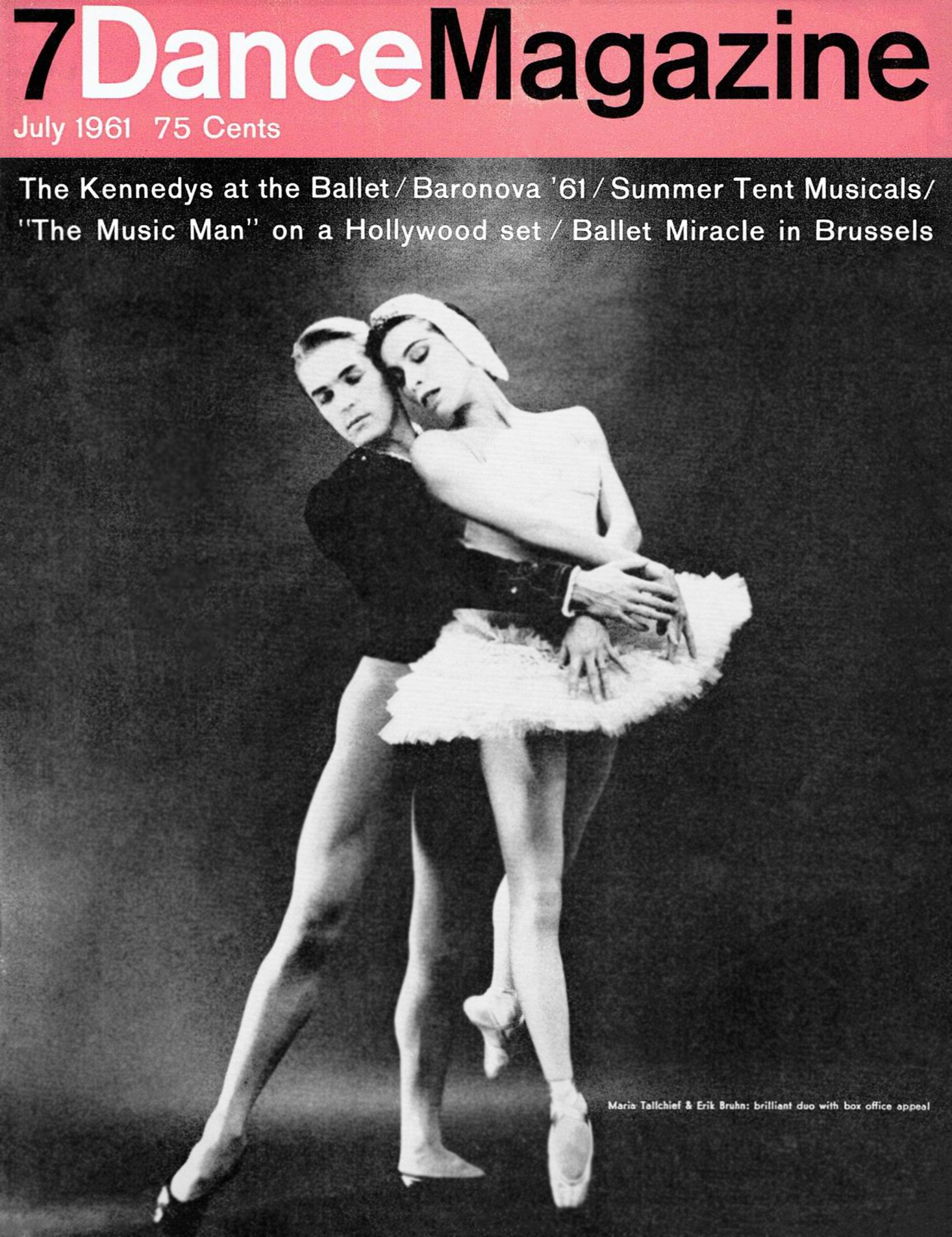
Dance Magazine July 1961 cover featuring Maria Tallchief (Osage)

- First Native American to become a major general in the U.S. Air Force: Clarence L. Tinker (Osage).
- First American to dance with the Paris Opera and receive the title of prima ballerina: Maria Tallchief (Osage).
- First Native American woman to work for Lockheed, and probably first Native American woman aeronautical engineer: Mary Golda Ross (Cherokee Nation).
- First Native American commissioned pilot in the United States Navy: Tom Oxendine (Lumbee).

1943

- First Navajo language newspaper: Adahooniligii.
- First Native American venerated as a saint by the Roman Catholic church: Kateri Tekakwitha (Mohawk/Algonquin).
- First Native American woman joins the Marine Corps Women's Reserve: Minnie Spotted-Wolf (Blackfeet Tribe).

1944

- First Muscogee person to earn the Medal of Honor: Ernest Childers (Muscogee (Creek) Nation).
- First person of Choctaw descent to earn the Medal of Honor: Van T. Barfoot (Mississippi Choctaw descent).
- First and only Native American WASP: Ola Mildred Rexroat (Oglala Lakota).
- First native American Navy WAVE officer: Maria Emiliana Aquino commissioned ensign

1945

- First Cherokee to earn the Medal of Honor: Jack Montgomery (Cherokee Nation).
- First anti-discrimination law passed in the United States: The Alaska Equal Rights Act of 1945, ending segregation of Alaska Natives.

1946

- First female elected Tribal Chair in the United States: Josephine Gates Kelly (Standing Rock Sioux)

1949

- First Hopi to earn the Indian Achievement Award from the Indian Council Fire: Fred Kabotie (Hopi).

=== 1950s ===
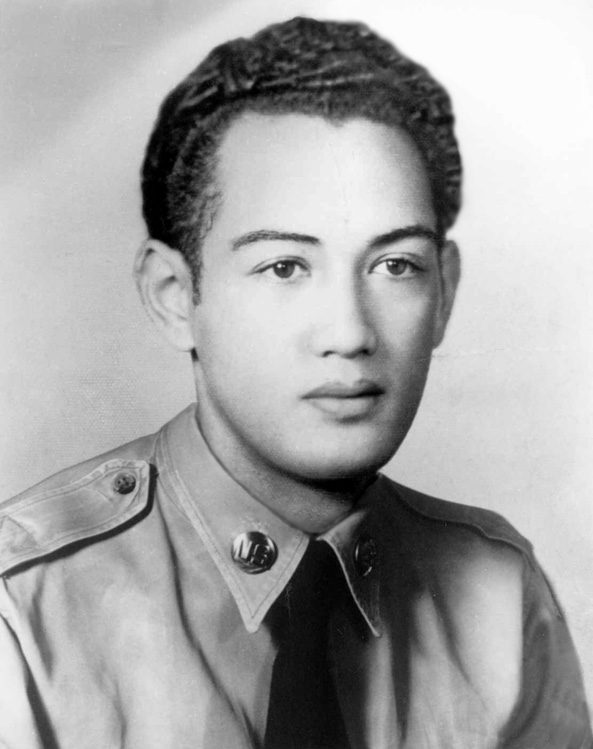
Herbert K Pililaau (Native Hawaiian)

1950

- First Native American veterinarian: Bernard Anthony Hoehner (Standing Rock Sioux).

1952

- First Hawaiian to be awarded the Medal of Honor: Herbert Kaili Pililaau (Native Hawaiian).
- First US Hall of Fame for Native Americans founded, National Hall of Fame for Famous American Indians, Anadarko, Oklahoma.

1953

- First Indian Miss America: Arlene Wesley James (Yakama).

1956

- First Native American to earn Western dentistry degree: George Blue Spruce (Laguna Pueblo).
- First Native American oncologist: James W. Hampton (Chickasaw/Choctaw).

1957

- First Native American elected to the Idaho State Legislature: Joseph R. Garry (Coeur d'Alene).
- First radio station to primarily broadcast in Navajo language: KNDN-AM.

1958

- First Native American to graduate from the United States Air Force Academy: Leo Johnson (Cherokee Nation/Chickasaw/Choctaw).

1959

- First woman president of the Mescalero Apache Tribe: Virginia S. Klinekole (Mescalero Apache).

=== 1960s ===
- First Native American pharmacist: Francis Quam (Zuni).

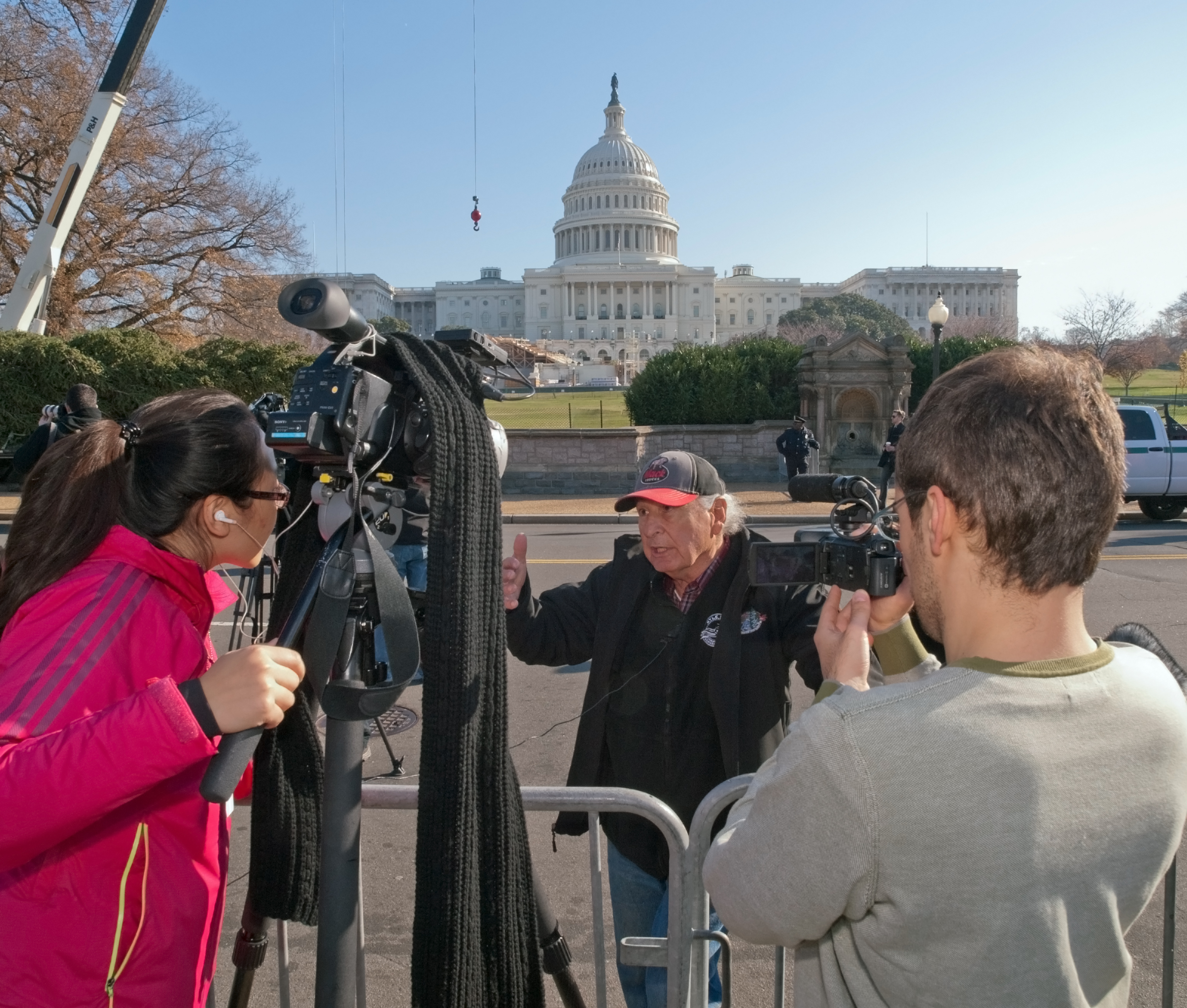
Ben Nighthorse Campbell (Northern Cheyenne) talks to news crew.

1960

- First Native American to own an FTD floral shop: Nunny Waano-Gano (Karuk).

1961

- First Native American elected to the U.S. Congress from South Dakota: Benjamin Reifel (Rosebud Sioux Tribe).

1962

- First Alaska Native newspaper: The Tundra Times with Howard Rock (Inupiaq) as the first editor.

1963

- First Native American to receive the Presidential Medal of Freedom: Annie Dodge Wauneka (Navajo).

1964

- First Native American elected to the New Mexico House of Representatives: James D. Atcitty (Navajo).
- First Native American on the United States Olympic Judo Team: Benjamin Nighthorse Campbell (Northern Cheyenne).
- First Native American to win an Olympic gold medal in the 10,000 meter run: William Mervin "Billy" Mills (Oglala Lakota).
- First Native American to earn a doctorate in psychology: Marigold Linton, from UCLA (Morongo Band of Mission Indians)

1966

- First Native American elected as New Mexico state senator: Tom Lee (Navajo).
- First Native American elected to the Arizona House of Representatives: Lloyd Lynn House (Navajo/Oneida).
- First Native American man to earn a doctorate in psychology: Arthur McDonald (Oglala Lakota).

1967

- First ballet written specifically for Native American dancers: Four Moons which was scored by Louis Ballard (Quapaw/Cherokee).
- First woman to chair the Seminole Tribe Council: Betty Mae Tiger Jumper (Seminole Tribe of Florida).

1969

- First Native American to receive a Pulitzer Prize: N. Scott Momaday (Kiowa).
- First Native American to become a public school district superintendent: Henry Gatewood (Navajo).
- First Native American to work as Indian Commissioner on the Indian Claims Commission: Brantley Blue (Lumbee).

=== 1970s ===
1970

- First broadcast license given to a Native American tribe (Lumbee): WYRU-AM.

1971

- First Native American job corps center founded: The Kicking Horse Regional Manpower Center.
- First Native American elected to the North Dakota state legislature: Arthur Raymond (Dakota/Oglala).
- First Navajo to earn a doctorate in physics: Fred Begay (Navajo).

1972

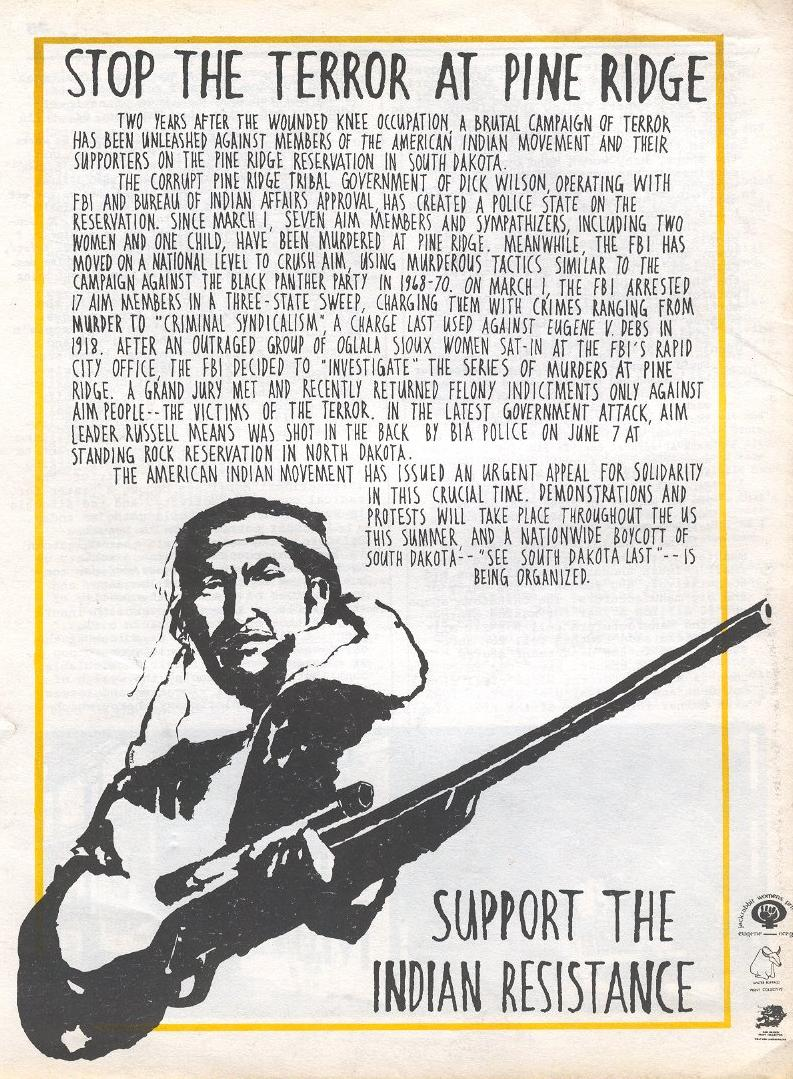
Article from Osawatomie about the Pine Ridge shootout

- First Native American owned and operated non-commercial radio station for Native American listeners: KTDB-FM (Ramah Navajo).
- First Native American on the United States Women's Table Tennis National Team: Angelita Rosal (Spirit Lake Dakota).
- First non-Japanese sumo wrestler to win the top division championship: Takamiyama Daigorō (Native Hawaiian).
- First induction ceremony of the American Indian Athletic Hall of Fame.

1974

- First Alaska Native to win the Iditarod Trail Sled Dog Race: Carl Huntington (Koyukon Athabascan).
- First Native American band to reach the top five on the Billboard Hot 100: Redbone with "Come and Get Your Love" at number 5.

1975

- First artist chosen by the Museum of the American Indian for a series on modern Native American art: R. C. Gorman (Navajo).
- First Native American practitioner of an Indigenous religion to give the invocation at the United States Senate: Frank Fools Crow (Oglala Lakota).
- First Native American woman dentist: Jessica Rickert (Prairie Band Potawatomi Nation).
- First woman to chair the Yavapai-Apache Tribe: Vera Brown Starr (Yavapai-Apache).
- First tribally owned and built golf course is opened by the Mescalero Apache Tribe.

1976

- First American Indian Studies master's degree program established by Charlotte Anne Wilson Heth (Cherokee Nation).
- First Jicarilla Apache woman to earn a doctorate degree: Veronica Velarde Tiller.
- First radio station broadcasting in the Navajo language and under Navajo control: The Navajo Radio Network.
- First chairperson of the Fort Sill Apache Tribe: Mildred Cleghorn (Fort Sill Apache).
- First Alaska Native to become a physician: Ted Mala (Inupiaq).
- First Native American to work for the United States Census Bureau: Edna Lee Paisano (Nez Perce/Laguna Pueblo).

1977

- First Inuit Circumpoloar Conference takes place.

1978

- First Native American artist to display their work in China: Joan Hill (Muscogee/Cherokee).
- First woman to serve as chair of the Cheyenne-Arapaho Tribes: Juanita L. Learned (Cheyenne-Arapaho).
- First person of Native American descent to earn a fellowship from the National Institute of Mental Health and the American Psychiatric Association: Catharine Gail Kincaid (Eastern Dakota descent).

=== 1980s ===
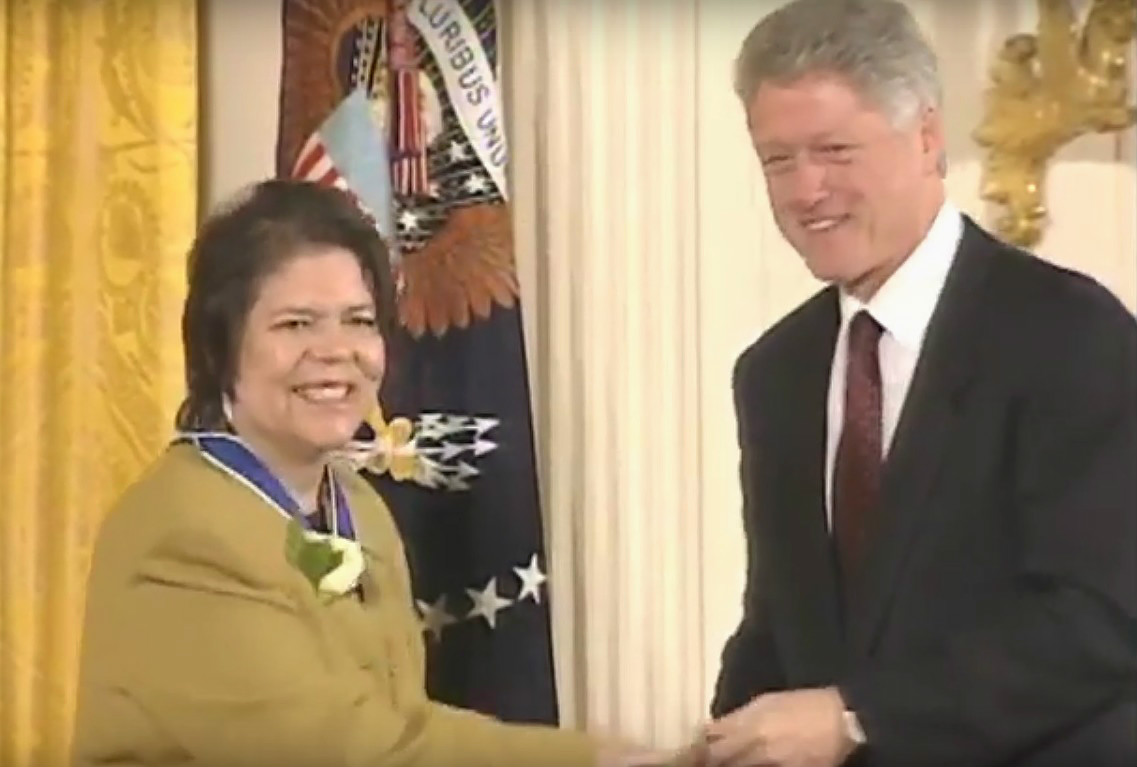
Wilma Mankiller (Cherokee Nation) and Bill Clinton in 1998

1980

- First Native American woman nominated for Vice President of the United States in any political party: LaDonna Harris (Comanche).
- First Native American woman to head the Southwestern Association for Indian Arts (SWAIA): Ramona Sakiestewa (Hopi)

1981

- First Native American woman to graduate from the United States Naval Academy: Sandra L. Hinds (unknown tribal affiliation).
- First American to direct the Paris Opera ballet: Rosella Hightower (Choctaw Nation).

1982

- First Native American elected to the Colorado House of Representatives: Benjamin Nighthorse Campbell (Northern Cheyenne).
- First Native American woman to graduate from the United States Air Force Academy: Dolores K. Smith (Cherokee Nation).
- First Native American director of Indian Health Services (IHS): Everett R. Rhoades (Kiowa).
- First tribe to open an electric plant: Confederated Tribes of the Warm Springs Reservation of Oregon.

1983

- First woman to work as attorney general for the Navajo Nation: Claudeen Bates Arthur (Navajo).
- First Native American woman to argue a successful case before the Supreme Court of the United States: Arlinda Locklear (Lumbee).
- First anthology of Native American women's art and literature is published: A Gathering of Spirit: A Collection by North American Women edited by Beth Brant (Bay of Quinte Mohawk).
- First television documentary produced by a crew of all-Indigenous people: I'd Rather Be Powwowing, directed by Larry Littlebird (Santo Domingo Pueblo).
- First Minnesota Ojibwe Nation woman to become a Western medical doctor: Kathleen Annette (White Earth Ojibwe).

1984

- First Alaska Native woman to earn a doctorate degree: Elizabeth Anne Parent (Athabascan).
- First Native American woman to graduate from West Point: Brigitte T. Wahwassuck (Prairie Band Potawatomi)

1985

- First woman to become a Cherokee Nation principal chief: Wilma Mankiller (Cherokee Nation).
- First Native American to receive the Anisfield-Wolf Book Award for race relations: Clifford Bahniptewa (Hopi).

1986

- First person of Native American descent ordained as Roman Catholic bishop: Donald E. Pelotte (Abenaki descent).
- First public recognition of the military service of the Choctaw code talkers.
- First American Indian Week celebrated during the week of November 23–30.

1987

- First Native American to become a fellow of the MacArthur Foundation: Leslie Marmon Silko (Laguna Pueblo descent).
- First Native American woman named as Ms. magazine's Woman of the Year: Wilma Mankiller (Cherokee Nation).
- First community-owned and operated clinic established on an Indian reservation: Porcupine Clinic by Loralei DeCora (Winnebago).
- First woman to elected as governor of the Isleta Pueblo: Verna Williamson (Isleta Pueblo).
- First woman in the Eastern Band of Cherokee to become a Western physician: Frances Owl-Smith (Eastern Band Cherokee).

1988

- First woman elected as tribal chair of the Turtle Mountain Chippewa: Twila Martin-Kehahbah (Chippewa/Cree).
- First Tuscarora Indian woman to become a Western surgeon: Susan Veronica Karol (Tuscarora Nation).

1989

- First book of poetry in Navajo is published by Rex Lee Jim (Navajo).
- First Native American news reporter on national television: Hattie Kauffman (Nez Percé).
- First Native American in Nevada to become a Western physician: Sharon M. Malotte (Te-Moak Shoshone).

=== 1990s ===
1990

- First Native American to win in a World Chess Championship open: Jason Stevens (Navajo).
- First Native American Month celebrated in November.

1991

- First Native American to receive the Freeman Tilden Award from the National Park Service and the National Parks and Conservation Association: Wilson Hunter (Navajo).
- First Native American state attorney general: Larry Echo Hawk (Pawnee).
- First Native American female student to graduate from the U.S. Coast Guard Academy: Mara Michelle Huling (Cherokee)

1993

- First play-by-play of an NBA game in a Native language is broadcast in Navajo.

1994

- First Native American appointed as United States Marshal in the modern era (post-1960s): Robert D. Ecoffey (Oglala Lakota Nation).
- First Navajo woman board certified in surgery: Lori Arviso Alvord (Navajo).
- First Native American woman to be licensed as an architect in the United States: Tammy Eagle Bull (Oglala Lakota Nation).
- First Native American woman to receive an acting award nomination from the Golden Globe Awards: Irene Bedard (Iñupiaq and Cree)

1995

- First Native American artwork travels in space: Don Montileaux's (Lakota) painting is on board the Endeavor.
- First woman to serve as principal chief of the Eastern Band of Cherokee Indians: Joyce Dugan (Eastern Band Cherokee).
- First Native American woman to play professional basketball for a foreign nation: Ryneldi Becenti (Navajo).

1996

- First Native American woman elected to the New Mexico House of Representatives: Lynda Morgan Lovejoy (Navajo).
- First Native American participant in the Paralympics: Cheri Madsen (Omaha).

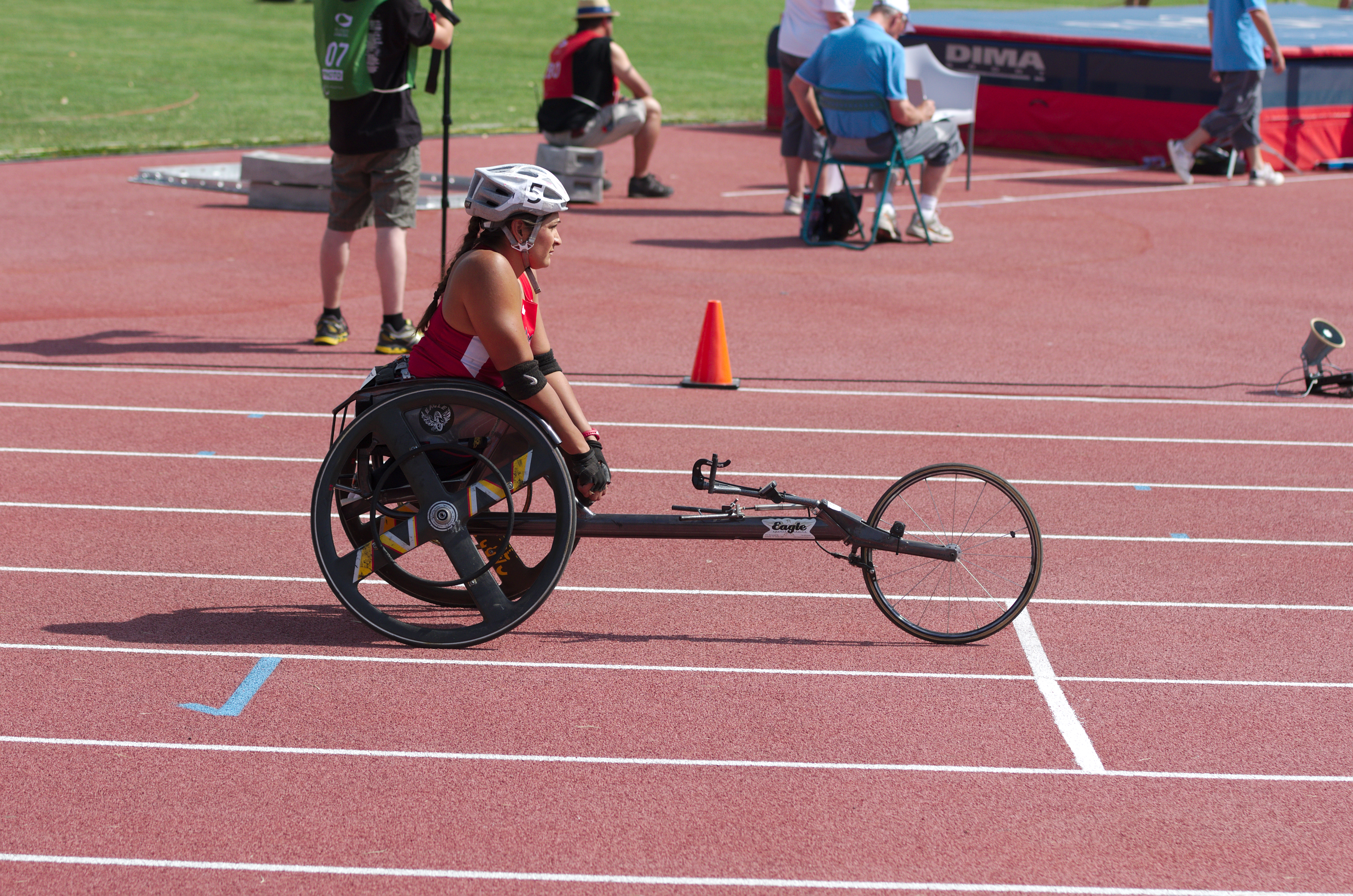
Cheri Masden (Omaha) in 2013

1997

- First Native American to play for the Women's National Basketball Association: Ryneldi Becenti (Navajo).
- First Native American women elected to the Arizona House of Representatives: Sally Ann Gonzales (Yaqui) and Debora Norris (Navajo).
- First Native American to be awarded the Award for Excellence from the American Public Health Association: Linda Burhansstipanov (Cherokee).
- First Native American Roman Catholic archbishop: Charles J. Chaput (Prairie Band Potawatomi)

1998

- First national awards for Native American music: Native American Music Awards (NAMA).
- First literary and artistic journal for Native Hawaiians: 'Ōiwi: A Native Hawaiian Journal founded by D. Mahealani Dudoit (Native Hawaiian).

1999

- First Navajo to earn a doctorate in history: Jennifer Denetdale (Navajo).

== 21st century ==
=== 2000s ===
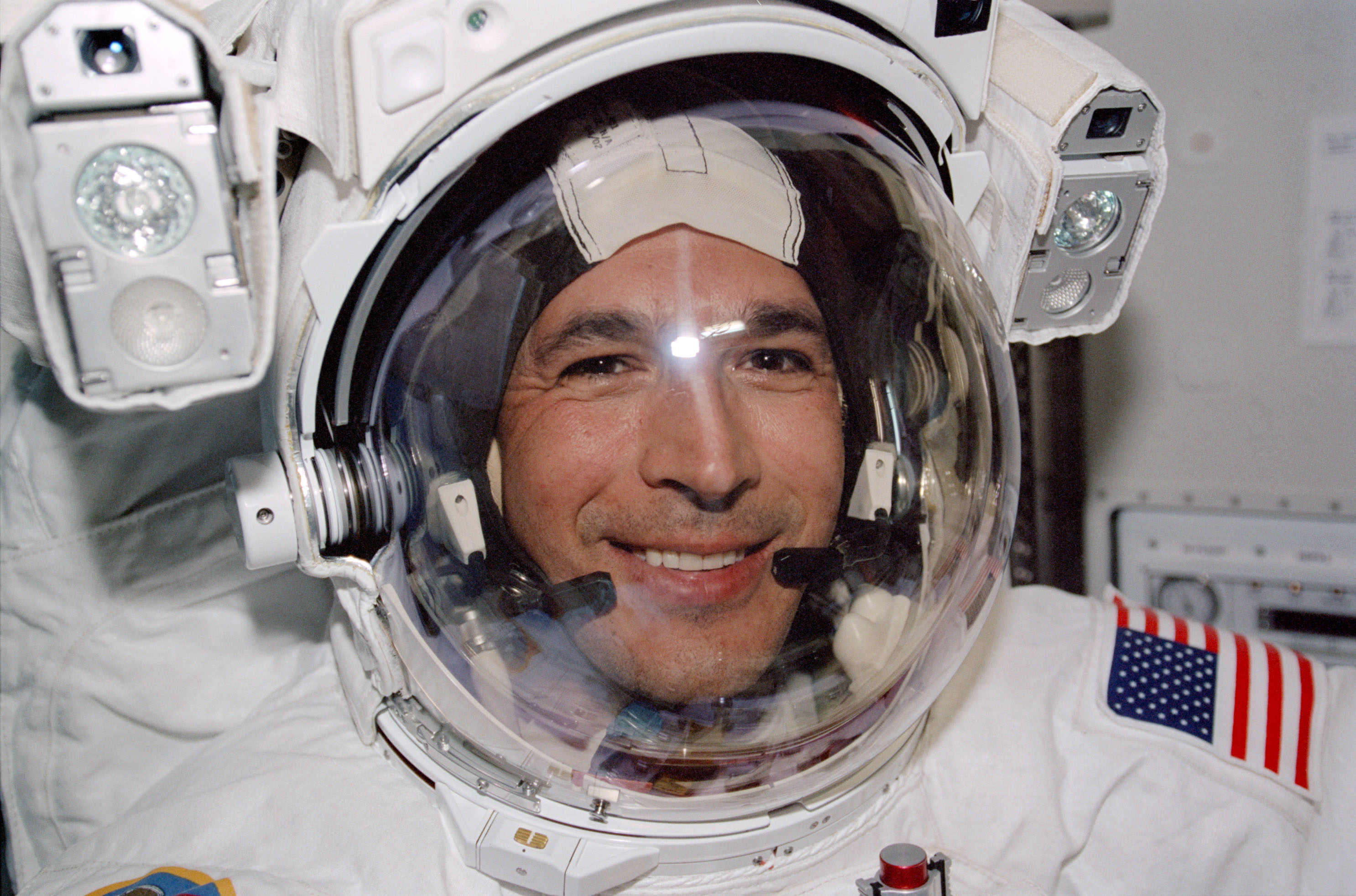
John Herrington (Chickasaw Nation)

2000

- First Native American president of the American Public Health Association: Michael E. Bird (Kewa Pueblo/Ohkay Owingeh).
- First Native American woman to graduate from Yale University School of Medicine: Patricia Nez Henderson (Navajo).

2001

- First Native Hawaiian drafted by Major League Soccer: Brian Ching (Native Hawaiian).
- First Native American to compete in the Indy 500: Cory Witherill (Navajo).

2002

- First Native American in space: John Herrington (Chickasaw Nation).
- First Native American woman to compete in the Winter Olympics: Naomi Lang (Karuk).

2003

- First tribe to own a professional sports team: The Mohegan Tribe purchases the Connecticut Sun.
- First Native American woman to die in combat while serving in the U.S. military and first woman in the U.S. military killed in the Iraq War: Lori Piestewa (Hopi).

2004

- First woman to serve as president of the tribal council for the Pine Ridge Indian Reservation: Cecelia Fire Thunder (Oglala Lakota).
- First woman tribal chair of the White Earth Ojibwe: Erma Vizenor (Ojibwe).
- First Native American museum established on the National Mall: National Museum of the American Indian.

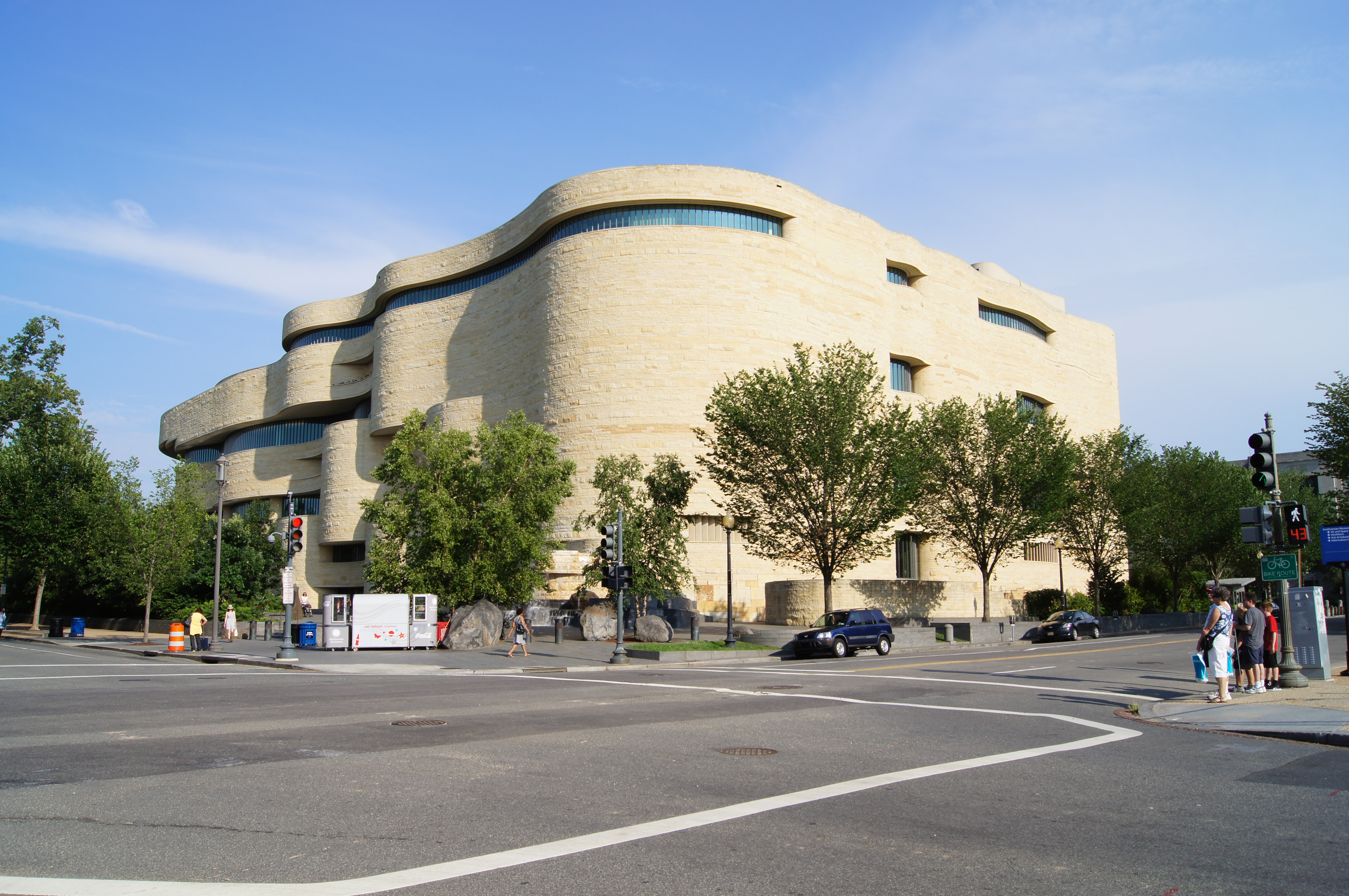
National Museum of the American Indian in Washington, D.C.

2005

- First tribe to purchase a professional men's basketball team: The Confederated Tribes and Bands of the Yakama Nation buys the Yakima SunKings.

2006

- First woman to serve as chief of the Eastern Shawnee Tribe of Oklahoma: Glenna Wallace (Shawnee).
- First awards announced in the American Indian Youth Literature Awards.

2007

- First Native American president of the American Library Association: Loriene Roy (White Earth Ojibwe).

2008

- First Native American woman elected to a statewide executive office: Denise Juneau (Three Affiliated Tribes of the Fort Berthold Reservation).
- First Native American to win the Heisman Trophy: Sam Bradford (Cherokee Nation).

=== 2010s ===
2010

- First woman to become a chief of the Delaware Tribe of Indians: Paula Pechonick (Delaware).
- First Native American nominated for the United States Poet Laureate: Linda Hogan (Chickasaw).

2011

- First Native American drafted into the WNBA: Tahnee Robinson (Northern Cheyenne).
- First woman chief of the Mississippi Band of Choctaw Indians: Phyliss J. Anderson (Choctaw).

2012

- First Native American woman to earn a science degree from University of Oxford: Kelsey Leonard (Shinnecock)

2014

- First Native American named a United States Ambassador to the United Nations: Keith Harper (Cherokee Nation).
- First Native American woman to become a federal judge in the United States: Diane Humetewa (Hopi).

2015

- First Native American-owned cannabis shop: Elevation, opened by the Squaxin Island Tribe.

2016

- First Native American to receive an electoral vote for President of the United States: Faith Spotted Eagle (Yankton Sioux Tribe)
- First Native American woman to receive an electoral vote for Vice President of the United States: Winona LaDuke (White Earth Ojibwe)

2017

- First Native-American to serve in the Wyoming State Senate: Affie Ellis (Navajo).
- First Native American woman to win a UFC championship title: Nicco Montaño (Navajo/Chickasaw).

2018

- First Native American women elected to the United States Congress: Sharice Davids (Ho-Chunk) and Deb Haaland (Laguna Pueblo).
- First Native American to serve as a law clerk for the Supreme Court of the United States: Tobi Merrit Edwards Young (Chickasaw Nation).

2019

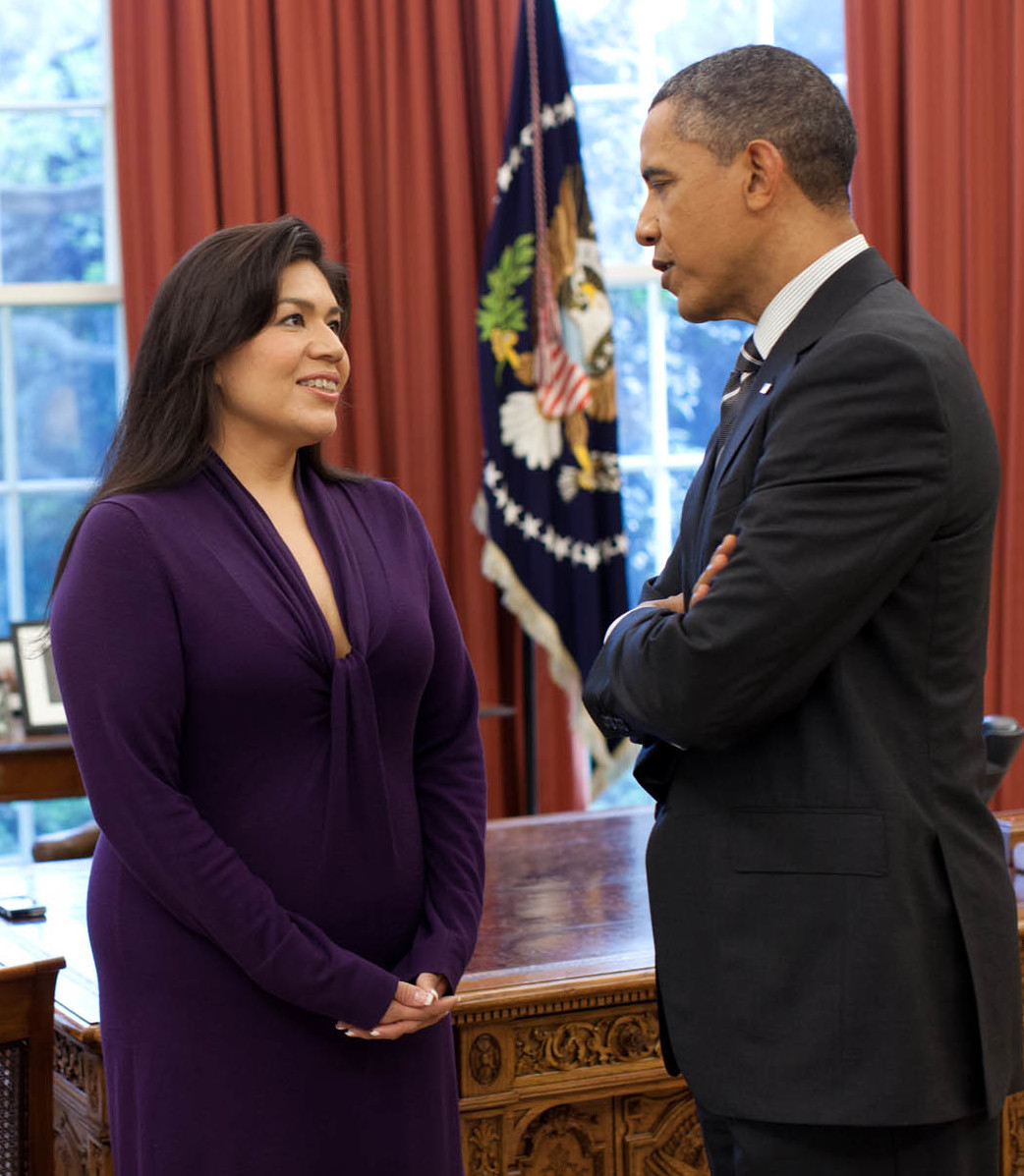
Barack Obama and Kimberly Teehee (Cherokee Nation), April 27, 2021

- First Native American to earn an honorary award from the Academy Awards: Wes Studi (Cherokee Nation).
- First Native American United States Poet Laureate: Joy Harjo (Mvskoke).
- First delegate to the United States House of Representatives from the Cherokee Nation: Kimberly Teehee (Cherokee Nation).
- First American nationally distributed children's show to feature an Alaska Native as the lead character: Molly of Denali, premiered in 2019.

=== 2020s ===
2020

- First painting on canvas by a Native American artist in the National Gallery of Art: I See Red: Target, by Jaune Quick-to-See Smith (Confederated Salish and Kootenai Tribes).
- First Native American to compete in the Tour de France: Neilson Powless (Oneida).
- First U.S. tribe to contribute heirloom seeds to the Svalbard Global Seed Vault: the Cherokee Nation.
- First Native American openly transgender person elected to office in America: Stephanie Byers, elected to the Kansas state House of Representatives (Chickasaw Nation).
- First Alaska Native to be featured on United States currency: Elizabeth Peratrovich (Tlingit).
- First Native American to play for the National Women's Soccer League: Madison Hammond (Navajo and San Felipe Pueblo).

2021

- First Native American to win a Caldecott Medal: Michaela Goade for We Are Water Protectors (Tlingit and Haida tribes).
- First Native American to serve as a US Cabinet secretary (Secretary of the Interior): Deb Haaland (Laguna Pueblo).
- First Native American woman to head a North Carolina Cabinet: Pamela Brewington Cashwell (Coharie and Lumbee)

2022

- First Native American to play in the U.S. Women's Open: Gabby Lemieux (Shoshone-Paiute Tribes of the Duck Valley Reservation).
- First Native American to win the Pulitzer Prize for Music: Raven Chacon (Navajo).
- First Native American woman to win a medal at the World Athletics Championships: Janee' Kassanavoid (Comanche).
- First Native American Treasurer of the United States: Marilynn Malerba (Mohegan).
- First Native American woman in space: Nicole Aunapu Mann (of Wailacki heritage, an enrolled member of the Round Valley Indian Tribes).
- First Native American elected to the position of bishop in the United Methodist Church: David Wilson (Choctaw Nation of Oklahoma).

2023

- First Native American woman to go on a spacewalk: Nicole Aunapu Mann (of Wailacki heritage, an enrolled member of the Round Valley Indian Tribes).
- First Native American female playwright to have a play produced on Broadway: Larissa FastHorse (Rosebud Sioux Tribe), with her play called The Thanksgiving Play.
- First Native American female president of the American Bar Association: Mary L. Smith (Cherokee Nation)
- First Native American woman elected to lead any national political party committee (upon being elected chair of the Democratic Lieutenant Governors Association): Peggy Flanagan (White Earth Nation).

2024

- First Native American actor to win a Golden Globe Award, winning for Best Actress in a Motion Picture – Drama: Lily Gladstone (Piegan Blackfeet and Nez Perce descent).
- First Native American nominated for the Academy Award for Best Actress: Lily Gladstone (Piegan Blackfeet and Nez Perce descent).
- First Native American nominated for the Academy Award for Best Original Song: Scott George (Osage).
- First Native American actor to win the Screen Actors Guild Award for Best Female Actor: Lily Gladstone (Piegan Blackfeet and Nez Perce descent).
- First Native American artist to have a solo exhibition in the American pavilion of the Venice Biennale: Jeffrey Gibson (Mississippi Choctaw/Cherokee).
- First Native American Committee on Appropriations chair: Tom Cole (Chickasaw Nation).
- First Native American actor known to have been nominated for a Tony Award: Sky Lakota-Lynch (Haliwa-Saponi Indian Tribe), nominated for the Tony Award for Best Featured Actor in a Musical.

2026

- First Native American woman elected to the Senate: Peggy Flanagan (White Earth Nation).
- First Native American woman elected governor: Deb Haaland (Laguna Pueblo).
- First Native American woman elected to any statewide elective executive office in Arizona: Clara Pratte (Navajo).
- First Native American elected to represent Michigan in Congress: Sean McCann (Potawatomi).
- First Alaska Native elected to the U.S. Senate: Mary Peltola (Yup'ik).

== See also ==
- List of African American firsts
- List of Asian American firsts
- Native Americans in the United States
