= Vizenor =

Vizenor is a surname. Notable people with the surname include:

- Erma Vizenor (born 1944), Ojibwe politician and educator
- Gerald Vizenor (born 1934), American writer and scholar
