= The Light People =

Novel by Gordon Henry

- Author: Gordon Henry
- Language: English
- Genre: Fiction, Novel
- Published: 1994, 2003
- Publisher: University of Oklahoma Press, Michigan State University Press
- Publication place: United States
- Media type: Print
- Pages: 226
- ISBN: 9780806125862

The Light People is a 1994 novel written by Gordon Henry. The book won the American Book Award in 1995. The Light People is a work of Native American fiction, composed of many distinct but ultimately interconnected stories happening in and around an Ojibwe village in northern Minnesota, and the Twin Cities.

== Background ==
Gordon Henry Jr. was born in 1955 in Philadelphia, Pennsylvania, and is an enrolled citizen of the White Earth Nation. He is currently an English professor at Michigan State University, where he has served as the director of the MSU College of Agriculture & Natural Resources' Native American Institute.

Henry has published numerous works of fiction, non-fiction and poetry related to the Anishinaabe peoples of North America, including a textbook. The Light People was originally published as part of the University of Oklahoma Press American Indian Literature and Critical Studies Series edited by Gerald Vizenor. The book was reprinted by Michigan State University Press in 2003.

== Characters ==
- Oskinaway: A boy from Four Bears Village whose mother leaves him in the beginning of the novel.
- Jake Seed: A wise old healer from the village and a relative of the Light People.
- Arthur Boozhoo: A magician who later becomes Jake Seed’s helper. He is a representation of Nanabozho, a trickster archetype in Ojibwe storytelling.
- Rose Meskwaa Geeshik: Jake Seed’s daughter, who creates elaborate anti-Vietnam War art. She stops painting after her husband is presumably killed in the war.
- Oshawa: A schoolboy whose family's stone hits Rose after a fit of anger. As an adult he discovers Four Bear's leg in a Minneapolis museum.
- Oshawanung: Oshawa's uncle, who was charged a young man with the task of burying Moses Four Bears' leg.
- Bombarto Rose: A mixed-blood author who seeks Elijah Cold Crow's writings.
- Elijah Cold Crow: The Prisoner of the Haiku, a performance artist and a convict who lost his voice from being abused as a boy in the American Indian boarding schools.
- Abetung: Oskinaway's father.
- Mary Squandum: Oskinaway’s estranged mother, a powwow dancer who falls for Abetung after he saves her.

== Summary ==
Oskinaway is a boy from Four Bears Village who goes to live with his grandparents after his mother's elopement. He grows curious about his tribe’s traditions and asks to be taken to a healer by the name of Jake Seed, to whom he inquires about the whereabouts of his mother. Seed sends his helper, Arthur Boozhoo, a magician whose career begins with illusions and memory tricks but later learns about Ojibwe magic. Boozhoo tells Oskinaway about his training with Seed and how he became his assistant.

Jake Seed grows ill, and his daughter Rose Meskwaa Geeshik comes to visit. Rose is a renowned painter whose husband is killed in the Vietnam War. After her husband's death, Rose becomes unable to paint and leads a secluded life back on the reservation. One afternoon, she is hit in the head with elaborately painted stone that came through her window, which she takes as a good omen. She is visited by Oshawa, a polite boy from a mission school who accidentally threw the stone that hit her. Oshawa is frequently teased and bullied by his classmates, and in his anger, plans to use the stone to get back at his bullies.

Oshawa's uncle, Oshawanung, tells the stone's history as it was passed down through his family. He regards the stone as a sign of his people's resilience. As a young man, Oshawa's uncle is tasked with burying the severed leg of village elder Moses Four Bears. However, he is unable to do so due to a harsh snow storm, and he takes shelter in a public library, where he reads a book by Bombarto Rose. Bombarto Rose is a mixed-blood author who writes poems and essays about his Native identity. Bombarto learns of the story of Elijah Cold Crow, or "The Prisoner of the Haiku," an artist who is imprisoned for vandalism and arson of public property. Cold Crow is unable to speak due to the severe abuse he suffered in boarding school for speaking his native Ojibwe language. In prison, Cold Crow learns about haiku and Anishinaabe dream songs, and eventually learns to speak again after being healed by a Native elder; however, he can only speak in short, haiku-like sentences. Bombarto meets with Cold Crow after his release but eventually finds the man's frozen body in a ditch, eaten by crows. Bombarto takes the man's body home, where he meets his mother. Cold Crow's Mother offers to tell Bombarto a story to pay him for helping her give her son a proper burial.

The novel then describes how Oskinaway's parents, Abetung and Mary Squandum, met when they became stuck in a snow bank after a road accident.They manage to escape, and Mary goes home with Abetung the same night, where Oskinaway is conceived. Mary's brother, Franklin Squandum, dies in the accident however.

Oshawa finds Moses Four Bears' leg in the Natural History Museum. A court case is called in order to prove the ownership of the leg, and many witnesses are called including Four Bears' daughter and Oshawanung himself. The story pivots back to Oshawanung, as he wakes up in the library after the snow storm. As he realizes he had not yet buried the leg, he goes to look for it but does not find it. He decides to keep the failure of his mission secret.

The novel flashes forward, and Oskinaway is a grown man disenchanted with his position at the Health and Human Services complex on the reservation. He enrolls in the veterinary college at Michigan State University. Close to his graduation, he stumbles upon a hurt black bird on top of the University's infamous painted Rock. Oskinaway becomes so obsessed with nursing the bird back to health that he neglects his studies and ends up failing out of the veterinary school. He moves back to Four Bears Village and begins to teach the bird to talk through a series of educational tapes that claim to teach birds how to talk through learning the constitution of the United States. However, Oskinaway discovers that the tapes are incomplete. The novel ends with the bird flying away, repeating the only phrase it learned "We the people."

== Themes and style ==
The Light People is a series of frame stories nested into one another. Each chapter follows the story of a character mentioned in the previous chapter. The book focuses on a few interconnected narratives, slowly linking together its ensemble of characters as the novel progresses. Henry produces a cross-genre novel by utilizing a diverse array of literary forms, including prose, poetry, haiku, lullabies, and court records. The book's chronology is non-linear, pivoting between flash-backs and flash-forwards.

Henry regularly invokes Anishinaabe mythology in The Light People. The book features many figures from traditional Ojibwe stories, such as menacing little people who can only be seen by medicine people in some renditions of the tradition. The character of Arthur Boozhoo follows the trickster and hero archetype, or Nanabozho in Ojibwe culture.

Kimberly Blaeser writes in "The New "Frontier" of Native American Literature: Dis-Arming History with Tribal Humor," that the book confronts political bias in Native American historiography with satire and humor.

In a 2005 paper titled "Narrative and Moral Intelligence in Gordon Henry Jr's The Light People," David Callahan states that the "narrative surprises generated by [Henry's] interlocking narratives" in the book are not merely post-modern deconstructions but rather devices used traditionally in Native American storytelling. Callahan writes that Oskinaway's narrative subverts the typical coming-of-age tropes of the Blidungsroman, depicting the boy's growing up as a communal rather than individualistic undertaking. Callahan also writes that Henry's complex and poetic sentence structure in flashback sequences depicts how fondly memories tend to be re-imagined.

In Goretti das Neves Moreira's 2007 PhD dissertation for the University of Aveiro, "The New Warrior in Gordon Henry's The Light People," he states that four characters, Oskinaway, Jake Seed, Oshawa and Bombarto Rose, are all linked together in the book to form a circle. This circle can be used to illustrate the relationships between their interconnected families and stories and the stories they transmitted to one another. Das Neves Moreira also notes that number four is a sacred number in Anishinaabe culture, which recurs in many forms in the story.

== Reception ==
The novel was well-received. In the New York Times Book Review, Peter Lewis writes of The Light People that "[h]eavy themes -- cultural identity, the rewriting of history, mythmaking -- lurk everywhere, waiting to go ponderous." A Publishers Weekly Fiction Book Review described the novel as "[...] a touching and slyly humorous read," and states that Gordon Henry "[...] draws inspiration from his own Anishinabe heritage for this imaginative and entertaining novel."

In 1995, The Light People won the Before Columbus Foundation's American Book Award.

At least 7 academic articles have been written about The Light People, citing it as an important work of Native American fiction. In "The New Warrior in Gordon Henry's The Light People," Goretti das Neves Moreira analyzes the book as a whole then goes on to analyze every chapter of the book.

== Sources ==
- Henry, Gordon (1994). The Light People. Michigan State University Press. ISBN 9780806125862.
