= Chip Wadena =

American Ojibwe tribal executive

Darrell "Chip" Wadena, Sr. (November 11, 1938 – June 24, 2014) was an American Ojibwe tribal executive.

Born in White Earth, Minnesota, Wadena grew up in Naytahwaush, Minnesota, and went to school there. He served in the United States Army, worked at the American Crystal Sugar Company, and in construction. Wadena served on the White Earth Indian Reservation tribal council and as chairman of the council from 1976 to 1996. As tribal chairman, he helped start the reservation's Shooting Star Casino. During his chairmanship, a community center and clinic were built on the reservation.

In 1996, Wadena was convicted in the United States District Court of bribery, conspiracy, theft, embezzlement, and money laundering, for which he served two years in prison. Dissatisfaction with his leadership, and suspicions of corruption, led to a 1990s campaign by other White Earth Band of Ojibwe members to end his tenure on the council. These events were covered in a 1999 documentary film by Nick Kurzon, Super Chief.

In 2004, Wadena made an unsuccessful attempt to regain the position of chairman; he was defeated by Erma Vizenor, a candidate who had raised concerns in the 1990s about Wadena's dealings and had given evidence against him at his trial.

Wadena died in Fargo, North Dakota, aged 75.
