= National Hall of Fame for Famous American Indians =

- Established: 1952
- Location: Anadarko, Oklahoma, United States
- Visitors: ca. 400,000 per year
- Website: americanindianhof.com

The National Hall of Fame for Famous American Indians (also known as American Indian Hall of Fame), established in 1952 in Anadarko, Oklahoma, was the first Hall of Fame for Native Americans founded in the US, is part of a complex representing American Indian life. The National Hall of Fame has bronze busts mounted outdoors. The Hall of Fame, which has free admission and is staffed by volunteers, features busts of 41 Native Americans from various tribes to honor their contributions and place in American history.

Founding Chairperson from 1952, Logan Billingsley, told the Orlando Sentinel in 1960, "It's time we stopped painting eerie pictures of the Indian in our school history books. Historians should write more truth about the American Indian and give more credit to some who were great Americans."

Also in Anadarko is the Southern Plains Indian Museum, which features highly-skilled arts and crafts of contemporary and historic artists from both the local Plains tribes, as well as other American Indians relocated to present-day Oklahoma in the 19th century, such as the Delaware, Caddo, Southeastern Woodlands tribes, and others. The museum was established in 1947 and features changing exhibitions and sales of art.

== The inducted ==
American Indians inducted into the Hall have included figures nationally known who never lived in Indian Territory, as well as those associated with Oklahoma during their lives. Among the American Indians inducted into the Hall have been

- Sequoyah (Cherokee), who created the Cherokee syllabary
- Charles Curtis (Kaw/Osage/Potawatomi), politician and vice-president of the United States
- Jim Thorpe (Sac and Fox), athlete and Olympic gold-medal winner
- Allie Reynolds (Creek), Six-time world series winner

Other figures include war chiefs from the Indian wars:

- Pontiac (Odawa)
- Black Hawk (Sauk),
- Sitting Bull (Hunkpapa Lakota),
- Tecumseh (Shawnee),
- Cochise (Chiricahua Apache),
- Geronimo (Chiricahua Apache), and
- Chief Joseph (Nez Perce).

There are also busts of Stand Watie and John Ross, Cherokee chiefs who took different sides in the American Civil War, Confederate and Union, respectively. Another military figure is Maj. Gen. Clarence L. Tinker (Osage), the highest-ranking army officer of Indian ancestry.

Four women, spanning colonial, 19th-century and contemporary times, were also inducted:

- Pocahontas, or Matoaka (Pamunkey), ally of Jamestown settlers and wife of John Rolfe
- Sacajawea (Lemhi Shoshone), interpreter and guide for Lewis and Clark Expedition
- Roberta Lawson (Delaware), leader of women's clubs and educational institutions, president of General Federation of Women's Clubs, with two million members
- Alice Brown Davis (Seminole), first woman elected as Principal Chief of the Seminole Nation of Oklahoma.

== See also ==
- National Native American Hall of Fame
- National American Indian Heritage Month
- Native American Day
- List of Native American firsts
