= White Earth, Minnesota =

Census-designated place in Minnesota, United States

White Earth, Minnesota Gaa-waabaabiganiikaag (Ojibwe)
- CDP
- Interactive map of White Earth, Minnesota
- Location within Minnesota
- Coordinates: 47.1014°N 95.8573°W
- Country: United States
- State: Minnesota
- County: Becker
- Named for: White Earth Indian Reservation

Area
  - Total: 3.937 sq mi (10.197 km^{2})
  - Land: 3.414 sq mi (8.843 km^{2})
  - Water: 0.523 sq mi (1.355 km^{2}) 13.28%
- Elevation: 1,532 ft (467 m)

Population (2020)
  - Total: 522
  - Estimate (2025): 537
  - Density: 153/sq mi (59.0/km^{2})
- Time zone: UTC–6 (Central (CST))
  - Summer (DST): UTC–5 (CDT)
- ZIP Code: 56591
- Area code: 218
- FIPS code: 27-70006
- GNIS feature ID: 2393850

White Earth (Ojibwe: Gaa-waabaabiganiikaag) is a census-designated place (CDP) in Becker County, Minnesota, United States. The population was 522 as of the 2020 census, and was estimated at 537 in 2025.

White Earth was named after the White Earth Indian Reservation, and that took its name from the White Earth Lake.

== Geography ==
According to the United States Census Bureau, the CDP has an area of 3.937 square miles (10.20 km^{2}), of which 3.414 square miles (8.84 km^{2}) is land and 0.523 square miles (1.35 km^{2}) (13.28%) is water.

== Demographics ==
Historical population
Census	Pop.	Note	%±
1990	319		—
2000	424		32.9%
2010	580		36.8%
2020	522		−10.0%
2025 (est.)	537		2.9%
U.S. Decennial Census; 2020 Census

As of the 2024 American Community Survey, there were 221 estimated households in White Earth with an average of 2.29 persons per household. The CDP has a median household income of $17,450. Approximately 63.6% of the CDP's population lives at or below the poverty line. White Earth has an estimated 37.4% employment rate, with 2.5% of the population holding a bachelor's degree or higher and 82.3% holding a high school diploma. There were 252 housing units at an average density of 73.81 per square mile (28.50/km^{2}).

The top five reported languages (people were allowed to report up to two languages, thus the figures will generally add to more than 100%) were English (85.2%), Spanish (2.9%), Indo-European (0.4%), Asian and Pacific Islander (0.0%), and Other (11.5%).

The median age in the CDP was 29.7 years.

=== 2020 census ===
As of the 2020 census, there were 522 people, 208 households, and 103 families residing in the CDP. The population density was 152.90 inhabitants per square mile (59.04/km^{2}). There were 227 housing units at an average density of 66.49 per square mile (25.67/km^{2}). The racial makeup of the CDP was 2.11% White, 0.00% African American, 91.76% Native American, 0.00% Asian, 0.00% Pacific Islander, 0.19% from some other races and 5.94% from two or more races. Hispanic or Latino people of any race were 0.96% of the population.

=== 2010 census ===
As of the 2010 census, there were 580 people, 222 households, and 126 families residing in the CDP. The population density was 169.89 inhabitants per square mile (65.59/km^{2}). There were 235 housing units at an average density of 68.83 per square mile (26.58/km^{2}). The racial makeup of the CDP was 5.00% White, 0.00% African American, 89.14% Native American, 0.17% Asian, 0.00% Pacific Islander, 0.17% from some other races and 5.52% from two or more races. Hispanic or Latino people of any race were 3.79% of the population.

=== 2000 census ===
As of the 2000 census, there were 424 people, 154 households, and 83 families residing in the CDP. The population density was 164.29 inhabitants per square mile (63.43/km^{2}). There were 165 housing units at an average density of 63.93 per square mile (24.68/km^{2}). The racial makeup of the CDP was 3.54% White, 0.00% African American, 93.63% Native American, 0.00% Asian, 0.00% Pacific Islander, 0.00% from some other races and 2.83% from two or more races. Hispanic or Latino people of any race were 2.12% of the population.

There were 154 households, out of which 32.5% had children under the age of 18 living with them, 16.9% were married couples living together, 26.6% had a female householder with no husband present, and 45.5% were non-families. 39.6% of all households were made up of individuals, and 16.2% had someone living alone who was 65 years of age or older. The average household size was 2.75 and the average family size was 3.79.

In the CDP, the population was spread out, with 38.9% under the age of 18, 11.1% from 18 to 24, 20.0% from 25 to 44, 21.0% from 45 to 64, and 9.0% who were 65 years of age or older. The median age was 25 years. For every 100 females, there were 100.0 males. For every 100 females age 18 and over, there were 97.7 males.

The median income for a household in the CDP was $12,361, and the median income for a family was $15,469. Males had a median income of $20,000 versus $19,375 for females. The per capita income for the CDP was $6,982. About 41.5% of families and 45.8% of the population were below the poverty line, including 51.1% of those under age 18 and 22.2% of those age 65 or over.

== Notable people ==
- Joe Guyon, Star Athlete, Inducted into both the College and Pro Football Halls of Fame.
- Chip Wadena, Tribal Chairman of the White Earth Reservation, was born in White Earth.
