= Clara Sue Kidwell =

Native American academic scholar, historian, feminist and author

- Born: July 8, 1941; Tahlequah, Oklahoma, United States
- Died: November 26, 2025 (aged 84); Owasso, Oklahoma
- Education: University of Oklahoma
- Scientific career
- Fields: Native American Studies

Clara Sue Kidwell (July 8, 1941-November 26, 2025) was a Native American academic scholar, historian, feminist and Native American author. She was enrolled in the Choctaw Nation of Oklahoma and of White Earth Ojibwe descent. She was considered to be a "major figure in the development of American Indian Studies programs."

== Biography ==
Kidwell was born in Tahlequah, Oklahoma, in 1941. Kidwell grew up in Muskogee, Oklahoma, and she was named for her two grandmothers, with whom she had a very close relationship as a child. Her paternal grandmother helped raise her while her parents worked as clerks at the Bureau of Indian Affairs. Kidwell attributes her focus on attention to detail to her childhood experiences learning from her parents to keep copies of everything and how to pay close attention to grammar from a high school teacher, Glady Nunn. In 1959 Kidwell graduated from Central High School and went on to attend the University of Oklahoma (OU). Kidwell received her bachelor's degree in 1963. While she was an undergraduate, she made the College Bowl Team which led to her receiving a fellowship in the history of science after she graduated with her bachelor's degree. She earned her master's in 1966 from OU. She finally received her Ph.D from the University of Oklahoma in 1970.

Kidwell began to teach American Indian studies in 1970 at Haskell Indian Junior College (now Haskell Indian Nations University). She worked at Haskell for two years until she left to be an associate professor at the University of California at Berkeley where she worked until 1993. At Berkeley, her "research and publication flourished" and she received fellowships from the Newberry Library and the Smithsonian Institution. In 1980, she was a visiting scholar and associate professor at Dartmouth College. After Berkeley, she took her career in a new direction as the assistant director for cultural resources at the National Museum of the American Indian. She helped move one million different pieces from the George Gustav Heye's Museum of the American Indian from New York to Washington, D.C. In 1995, she chose a tenured position at the University of Oklahoma as the director of the Native American studies program. She contributed the piece "Native Americans: Restoring the Power of Thought Woman" to the 2003 anthology Sisterhood Is Forever: The Women's Anthology for a New Millennium, edited by Robin Morgan.

In 2007, Kidwell started the American Indian Center (AIC) at the University of North Carolina (UNC). One of her major goals at AIC was to reach out to the many Eastern tribes such as the Coharie Intra-tribal Council, Inc., which is unable to qualify for federal recognition with the Bureau of Indian Affairs for various reasons, and the Lumbee Tribe of North Carolina, which received federal recognition in 2026. Under Kidwell's leadership, AIC has had success in North Carolina increasing programs that address education, health, and child welfare for these kinds of state-recognized tribes. She has also helped increase the "visibility of Native history and culture on campus." Kidwell retired from her position as director of AIC in June 2011.

== Selected bibliography ==
- Kidwell, Clara Sue (2009). "American Indian Studies: Intellectual Navel Gazing or Academic Discipline?". The American Indian Quarterly. 33 (1): 1–17. doi:10.1353/aiq.0.0041. S2CID 161214774.
- —— (2008). The Choctaws in Oklahoma: From Tribe to Nation, 1855–1970. foreword by Lindsay G. Roberston. University of Oklahoma Press. ISBN 978-0806140063.
- ——; Velie, Alan (2005). Native American Studies. Lincoln, Nebraska: University of Nebraska Press. ISBN 978-0803278295.
- —— (2003). "Native Americans: Restoring the Power of Thought Woman". Sisterhood is Forever. Washington Square Press. pp. 165–175. ISBN 9780743466271.
- —— (2002). "American Indian Studies at the University of Oklahoma". In Champagne, Duane; Stauss, Jay (eds.). Native American Studies in Higher Education: Models for Collaboration between Universities and Indigenous Nations. Oxford, England: AltaMira Press. pp. 29–42. ISBN 9780759101258.
- ——; Noley, Homer; Tinker, George E. (2001). A Native American Theology. Orbis Books. ISBN 978-1570753619.
- —— (1999). "The Vanishing Indian Reappears in the College Curriculum" (PDF). In Swisher, Karen Gayton; Tippeconnic, John (eds.). Next Steps: Research and Practice to Advance Indian Education. Eric Clearinghouse on Rural. pp. 271–292. ISBN 978-1880785218.
- —— (1995). Choctaws and Missionaries in Mississippi, 1818–1918. University of Oklahoma Press. ISBN 978-0806129143.
- —— (1994). "What Would Pocahontas Think Now?: Women and Cultural Persistence". Callaloo. 17 (1): 149–159. doi:10.2307/2932084. JSTOR 2932084. S2CID 163576497.
- —— (1992). "Indian Women as Cultural Mediators". Ethnohistory. 39 (2): 97–107. doi:10.2307/482389. JSTOR 482389.
- ——; Roberts, Charles (1980). The Choctaws: A Critical Bibliography. Indiana University Press. ISBN 978-0253344120.
- —— (1978). "The Power of Women in Three American Indian Societies". Journal of Ethnic Studies. 6 (3): 113–121.
