= Gordon Henry (poet) =

American poet

Gordon Henry at event on contested claims of indigeneity in Vermont.

Gordon Henry Jr. (born 1955) is a poet and fiction writer.

== Life and work ==
Henry was born in Philadelphia, Pennsylvania. He is an enrolled member of the White Earth Band of Ojibwe of Minnesota. He received his PhD in literature from the University of North Dakota and is currently a professor of English at Michigan State University.

Henry's literary works have been recognized and highlighted at Michigan State University in their Michigan Writers Series.

Henry's first novel, The Light People (1994), explores Chippewa life and culture and the style takes some of its elements from the Chippewa style of oral story telling. He co-authored the textbook Ojibwa and has released a book of poetry, The Failure of Certain Charms, (Earthworks). In 2022, he published a second poetry collection, "Spirit Matters", (Holy Cow! Press). Gordon has also published short stories and poems in various journals and anthologies.
