= Kathleen Annette =

American public health advocate

Kathleen Annette (born 1955) is a public health advocate from Minnesota. She is president and CEO of Blandin Foundation. She is a member of the White Earth Band of the Chippewa tribe and is the first Ojibwe woman to become a doctor. She is the first woman area director for the Bemidji Indian Health Service, an organization that provides support to Native American tribes and Native American public health programs across the Upper Midwest.

== Early life and education ==
Annette grew up on the Red Lake Indian Reservation. She earned her undergraduate degree in Chemistry at the University of Minnesota, after which she matriculated into University of Minnesota Medical School. She earned her doctor of medicine in 1983. She cites her preparation for college as one of her life's greatest obstacles, stating, "I was ill-prepared, initially, for college. No-one from the reservation high school had ever successfully pursued a medical education."

== Adult life and career ==
Annette completed her residency at the Duluth Family Practice Center and became board-certified to practice medicine independently in 1986. After her certification, she joined the Indian Health Service (IHS) as a medical officer serving the Leech Lake Service Unit at Cass Lake, Minnesota. She remained there for several years, working her way up to higher levels of authority and responsibility. In 1990, she became the director of the entire Bemidji Area of the IHS, overseeing health services for approximately sixty thousand Native Americans in Illinois, Indiana, Michigan, Minnesota, and Wisconsin.

Annette used her position as area director to bring awareness to Native American public health issues. She spoke at a range of health care conferences and was an active member of a Centers for Disease Control and Prevention advisory committee concerned with emerging infectious diseases. She also speaks about her work at medical schools nationwide, with the hope of inspiring young Native Americans who aspire to professional careers.

Annette retired from government service in 2011, and is CEO of the Blandin Foundation.
