= Superchief (film) =

Superchief is a 1999 documentary film directed by Nick Kurzon, that is about a campaign and election for a new White Earth Nation tribal chairman for the White Earth Ojibwe Reservation. Its running time is 72 minutes. The film was screened at the Los Angeles AFI Film Festival. Its television debut was on the HBO Signature channel.
