= Brigitte Wahwassuck Kwinn =

- Born: May 14, 1962 (age 64); Missouri
- Spouse: Lt. Col. Mike Kwinn
- Children: 5
- Military career
- Ordnance: United States Army
- Service years: 1984-2006
- Rank: Lieutenant Colonel
- Known for: First native American female to graduate from West Point

Brigitte Wahwassuck Kwinn was the first female native American (Prairie Band Potawatomi Nation) of the U.S. Military Academy at West Point in 1984.

== Early life ==
Born May 14, 1962 in southern Missouri to an army family.

== Military career ==
At West Point, Wahwassuck would play for the volleyball team from 1981-1983.

After graduating West Point, Wahwassuck was sent to Ordnance school at Redstone Arsenal in Huntsville, Alabama. After completing the course, she visited fellow cadet Mike Kwinn and then got married so that they could be stationed together in Germany. She completed airborne school before shipping out in December to the 5th Nike-Hercules missile group. By the time they left Germany, she would be a captain.

The Kwinn's would be sent to Fort Carson, Colorado as commander of the 50th Ordnance Company, 4th Support Group in 1989. Then she would attend the University of Arizona from 1991-94 and earn a master's degree in engineering before joining the faculty at West Point from 1994-1997. She would then attend the Command and General Staff College at Fort Leavenworth, Kansas. In 1998, she would be stationed at Fort Hood as a battalion executive officer, while her husband attended the University of Texas and earned a doctorate degree. She would deploy to Bosnia while at Fort Hood. After returning to the U.S., she would be sent to South Korea. She would teach at West Point as the Core Engineering Program Director in the department of engineering from 2002-2006. Kwinn would retire as a Lieutenant Colonel.

== Post military career ==
After retiring from the army, she would coach volleyball at John Burke Catholic High School and lecture at the Naval Postgraduate School from 2008-2021.

== Personal life ==
She was married to Lt. Col. Michael J. Kwinn, Ph.D. (West Point Class of 1984). They have four daughters: Cheryl an MIT graduate, Jasmine, Jade, and Emerald and one son Michael who died from a brain tumor in May 31, 2003.

== Awards ==
Wayne E. Meyer Award for Teaching Excellence in Systems Engineering (Distance Learning) in 2010.
