= Eastern Shawnee Tribe of Oklahoma =

Native American tribe in Oklahoma

Total population
- 3,921

Regions with significant populations
- United States (Oklahoma)

Languages
- Shawnee, English

Religion
- Christianity, traditional tribal religion

Related ethnic groups
- Absentee-Shawnee Tribe of Indians of Oklahoma, Shawnee Tribe, and Sac and Fox

The Eastern Shawnee Tribe of Oklahoma is one of three federally recognized Shawnee tribes. They are located in Oklahoma and Missouri.

The tribe holds an annual powwow every September at their powwow grounds. This is not a closed powwow, and visitors from other tribes or peoples are welcome as long as they respect the Shawnee culture.

== Government ==
Map of Eastern Shawnee Tribe of Oklahoma's tribal jurisdictional area (OTSA) and nearby jurisdiction areas.

The headquarters of the Eastern Shawnee Tribe are Wyandotte, Oklahoma, and their tribal jurisdictional area is in Ottawa County, Oklahoma. There are 3,921 enrolled tribal citizens, and 904 of them living within the state of Oklahoma. Some live nearby in Missouri, where the tribe has a Cultural Preservation Center at Seneca, Missouri, and a community in western Missouri.

As of 2025, the current administration is:

- Glenna J. Wallace, first elected in 2006
- 2nd Chief: Chris Samples
- Secretary: Kathie Kent
- Treasurer: Terri Landis
- 1st Council: Clint Kissee
- 2nd Council: Shawn Daugherty
- 3rd Council: Cliff Carpenter

The Business Committee is the Legislative Branch and consists of six members elected at large. The Second Chief, Treasurer, Secretary, First Council, Second Council, and Third Council comprise the Business Committee. The Eastern Shawnee Tribe issues its own tribal vehicle tags.

Citizenship in the tribe is based on documented lineal descent to persons listed on the Dawes Rolls. The tribe has no minimum blood quantum requirements.

== Economic Development ==
The Eastern Shawnee Tribe of Oklahoma owns and operates the Indigo Sky Casino & Resort and Outpost Casino. They operate their own housing authority. They own 51% of the shares in the People's Bank of Seneca, Missouri; The Eastern Shawnee Tribe owns a Print Shop; Four Feathers Recycling, an Early Childhood Learning Center, and a splash pad. Their annual economic impact is estimated by the Oklahoma Indian Affairs Commissions to be $164,000,000.

== History ==
The Eastern Shawnee Tribe of Oklahoma are primarily descendants of Shawnees who lived in Ohio until the 1830s. The Shawnees, an Eastern Woodland tribe who were once nomadic, occupied territory throughout what became the eastern United States, living in present-day Ohio, Virginia, West Virginia, Western Maryland, Kentucky, and Pennsylvania. In the late 18th century, European-American encroachment crowded Shawnee lands in the east, and one band migrated to Missouri, eventually becoming the Absentee Shawnee tribe.

Three reservations were granted to the Shawnees in Ohio by the 1817 Treaty of Fort Meigs: Wapakoneta, Lewistown, and Hog Creek. After the Indian Removal Act of 1830 passed, the Lewiston band, who lived with a group of Senecas, relocated to Indian Territory in July 1831, and were known as the "Mixed Band" of Senecas and Shawnees. Another band, who would become the federally recognized Shawnee Tribe, relocated to Kansas in August 1831.

The U.S. federal government carved out a 60,000-acre (240 km^{2}) reservation for the "Mixed Band" or United Nation of Senecas and Shawnees from Cherokee lands in Indian Territory in 1832. A treaty was negotiated between the US and the Seneca and Shawnee in 1867, which made portions of their land available to other tribes, and restored the independence of the Seneca and Shawnee tribes. They were from different language families, Iroquoian and Algonquian, respectively. The Shawnees of the "Mixed Band" became the Eastern Shawnee Tribe. The Eastern Shawnee organized as a federally recognized tribe under the 1936 Oklahoma Indian Welfare Act.

In May 2019, the Eastern Shawnee ceremonial grounds flooded with three feet of water. Thirty families were evacuated, and "local roads stayed impassable for weeks." Tribal leaders have joined the city of Miami in opposition to increased water levels at Pensacola Dam and Grand Lake. They argue that when the water backs up downstream on the Neosho River, it can increase problems with flooding in their communities.

== Flag ==
The tribe's flag displays our tribal seal on a white (sometimes red) field. The seal displays the Me-she-Pe-She, the panther, and the Wa-be-the, the swan. The story of the beginning of our tribe was recorded by George Blue Jacket in 1829 as a record of the tale passed down through generations of Shawnee people.

The story goes that the Grandmother of Shawnee people came across the great salt water (Atlantic Ocean, presumably) holding the tail of a panther and our Grandfather was carried on the back of a swan, thus beginning the Shawnee People. The Panther also represents courage, strength, and prowess in battle. The Swan symbolizes tranquility, peace and beauty. The symbolism of these two animals contrasts just as distinctly as the black and white colors contrast. The two feathers on the spear symbolize our dual citizenship in the United States and Eastern Shawnee Tribe of Oklahoma. The spear itself represents that we will fight to our death to defend this universe that we hold as sacred.

All of this sits inside of a circle, representing the universe; continuous, never-ending, with no beginning nor no ending, only one world, one universe, one tribe united. The round shape encircles and holds all of the other objects, just as the tribe holds all of its citizens as one. The shape with four eagle feathers at the bottom. The four feathers hold significance to our tribe and many others as a symbol of the four elements, four winds and four directions. Eagle feathers were used for our flag due to the fact that the Eagle is the most revered of all species and symbolizes courage, strength and spirit. The Eagle is said to be the closest to the Creator and rumored to have even seen the Creator's face.

== Notable Eastern Shawnee people ==
- J. R. Conrad (1974–), National Football League player
- Moscelyne Larkin (1925–2012), ballerina
- Glenna J. Wallace, Chief (2006–present)
- Taylor M. Wright (1993–), U.S. Army Officer
- Thomas Captain, Chief (1850 - 1920)
- Thomas A Captain, Chief (1884 - 1980)

== See also ==
- Shawnee language
- Stomp dance
