= Glenna Wallace =

Eastern Shawnee chief

Glenna J. Wallace

Chief of the Eastern Shawnee Tribe of Oklahoma
- Incumbent
- Assumed office 2006

Personal details
- Born: c. 1939 (aged c. 85) Oklahoma, United States
- Children: 3
- Education: Pittsburg State University (MA)
- Profession: Educator

Glenna J. Wallace (born c. 1939) is an educator and politician who has served as Chief of the Eastern Shawnee Tribe of Oklahoma since 2006. Wallace is the first woman to serve as Chief of the Eastern Shawnee.

== Early life ==
Wallace was born in Ottawa County, Oklahoma, and has lived in Oklahoma almost all of her life. Wallace studied at Pittsburg State University where she graduated with Bachelor of Arts, Master of Arts and Education Specialist degrees. She continued her post-graduate education at The University of Tulsa, the University of Arkansas, and Missouri State University.

== Career ==
Wallace worked at Crowder College in Neosho, Missouri for 38 years, working as an instructor, interim academic dean, director of travel, department chair, and division chair.

In 2006, she was elected Chief of the Eastern Shawnee Tribe of Oklahoma, becoming the tribe's first female chief. Prior to being elected Chief, she served for 18 years on the Eastern Shawnee Business Committee.

Wallace has played a leading role in preserving earthworks in Ohio, the cultural homeland of the Eastern Shawnee Tribe of Oklahoma. She also advocates for the return of human remains and funerary objects through the Native American Graves Protection and Repatriation Act. In 2009, Wallace visited the Octagon Earthworks in Newark, Ohio. She was inspired by the knowledge of geometry and architecture of the earthworks, but astounded that the site was made into a golf course as part of the Mound Builders Country Club. On Sep. 19, 2024, the Hopewell Ceremonial Earthworks was awarded World Heritage status. Chief Wallace gave the acceptance speech on behalf of the Hopewell delegation.

== See also ==
- List of Native American politicians
- Native American women in politics
