= Wa-o-wa-wa-na-onk =

American physician (died 1871)

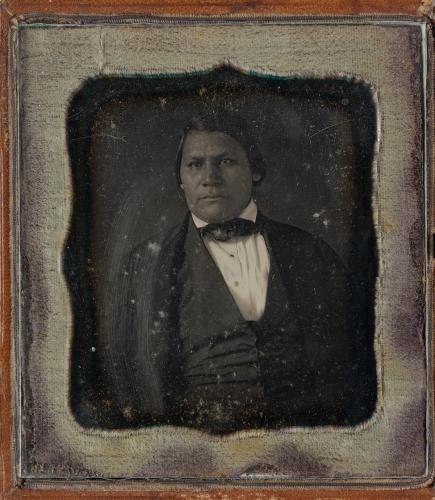
Daguerreotype of Wa-o-wa-wa-na-onk or Peter Wilson. Created in the 1850s.

Wa-o-wa-wa-na-onk or Peter Wilson (died 1871, alternate spellings are Waowawanaonk, Wau-wah-wa-na-onk, and De jih'-non-da-weh-hoh) was a Cayuga medical doctor and possible chief. His name translates roughly to "They Heard His Voice" or "The Pacificator."

Wa-o-wa-wa-na-onk was raised on the Seneca Buffalo Reservation and was educated in Quaker schools on the reservation. He graduated with a medical degree from Geneva Medical College in 1844. He was one of the first Native Americans to earn a medical degree. Wa-o-wa-wa-na-onk also worked as an interpreter on the Cattaraugus Reservation. Some records list him as a chief, or a "Grand Sachem," but it was uncertain if he officially held the title.

Wa-o-wa-wa-na-onk was a signatory on a fraudulent land treaty executed in 1838 and signed as a chief. He worked with the Quakers to have the treaty reversed, creating another treaty in 1842. On behalf of the Cayuga people in New York, he wrote a letter to the Governor of New York in 1843. In 1846, Wa-o-wa-wa-na-onk spoke to the New York Historical Society about regaining Haudenosaunee land lost through fraud. Wa-o-wa-wa-na-onk petitioned the New York State Legislature in 1853 in order to address the issue of State compensation to the Cayuga's loss of land. He continued to seek the case in 1861 after the state did not appropriate funds for the Cayuga.

He often spoke to different groups in New York in order to obtain allies in his cause to maintain the homeland of both the Seneca and Cayuga people. He also urged groups to support women's suffrage.
