= Roberta Lawson =

Native American activist from Oklahoma (1878–1940)

- Born: Roberta E. Campbell; October 30, 1878; Alluwe, Indian Territory in Nowata County
- Died: December 31, 1940 (aged 62); Tulsa, Oklahoma
- Citizenship: Cherokee Nation (1794–1907) and U.S.
- Occupations: Women's Advocate, Club Woman
- Spouse: Eugene Lawson (m. 1901–1931) (his death)
- Children: 1

Roberta Lawson (née Campbell, October 31, 1878, Alluwe, Indian Territory – December 31, 1940, Tulsa, Oklahoma) was a Lenape-Scots-Irish activist, community organizer, and musician. During World War I, she was the head of the Women's Division of the Oklahoma Council of Defense. She was president of the Oklahoma State Federation of Women's Clubs, organized to support community welfare and educational goals. As music chairman of the General Federation of Women's Clubs, in 1926, she wrote Indian Music Programs for clubs and special days of celebration. In 1935 she was elected president of the General Federation. She served a three-year term leading its two million members to work toward "uniform marriage and divorce laws, birth control, and civic service."

== Early life and education ==
Born Roberta E. Campbell, she was the daughter of Emeline Johhnycake, a Lenape and daughter of Charles Johnnycake, the last Lenape chief, and John Edward Campbell, of Scots-Irish descent from Virginia. Her father had migrated to Oklahoma after the American Civil War and became a successful trader. Roberta learned from both sides of her family; she was tutored at home and later attended a seminary and Hardin College in Missouri. She learned Lenape chants and music from her mother and maternal grandfather, Charles, which later inspired her compositions.

== Marriage and family ==
In 1901 she married Eugene Lawson (d. 1931), an attorney who had settled in Nowata, Indian Territory. He also worked in banking and the oil industry. They had one son together, Edward Campbell Lawson, born in 1905. Later they moved to Tulsa, Oklahoma, where he founded an oil company. After his father's death, the younger Lawson became president of their Tulsa-based Lawson Petroleum Company.

== Civic career ==
When Lawson returned from college, she wanted to form new clubs that were all about friendship and culture. Lawson became active in women's clubs organized to address social and community needs. In 1903 she became president of the Nowata Women's Club, and by 1917 was elected to a term to the Oklahoma State Federation of Women's Clubs. The following year, she became active in the General Federation of Women's Clubs, where she held several offices, including music chairman. During that time, she wrote compositions for Indian Music Programs for clubs and Special Music Days (1926). While she served as president from 1935 to 1938, she led the General Federation's two million members in goals of "uniform marriage and divorce laws, birth control, and civic service."

Her local and regional leadership earned Lawson recognition and new challenges at the state and national levels. During World War I, she was appointed by the Oklahoma governor as head of the Women's Division of the Oklahoma Council of Defense. During the Great Depression and the administration of President Franklin D. Roosevelt, Lawson was selected for Eleanor Roosevelt's National Committee for the Mobilization for Human Needs (1933–1934).

Lawson served as the director of the Oklahoma Historical Society, as a member of the Board of Regents for Oklahoma College for Women (now the University of Science and Arts of Oklahoma) in Chickasha, and as a member of the board of trustees of the University of Tulsa. She also belonged to local music and women's clubs in Tulsa and the city's First Presbyterian Church, as well as the Daughters of the American Revolution, a heritage organization. Lawson died because of leukemia on December 31, 1940, and was later buried in Tulsa's Memorial Park Cemetery. In her life, Lawson is remembered for spending 35 years total in club work, and changing her communities such as Tulsa, Nowata, and in general Oklahoma for the better.

== Legacy and honors ==
- 1935, inducted into Oklahoma Women's Hall of Fame.
- Lawson was one of the four women inducted into the American Indian Hall of Fame, and her bronze bust is included among the 41 displayed at Anadarko, Oklahoma.
