= Erma Vizenor =

Ojibwe politician and educator

Erma Jean Vizenor is an Ojibwe politician and educator. She served as the tribal chair of the White Earth Nation from 2004 to 2016. Under her leadership, White Earth adopted a new tribal constitution. She served as an educator in the White Earth Indian Reservation for 20 years. Vizenor was president of Leech Lake Tribal College in 2016.

Vizenor earned her doctoral education degree from Harvard University. She also earned degrees from North Dakota State University and Minnesota State University Moorhead.

== Early life and education ==
Erma Jean Vizenor was born in 1944 in Cass Lake, Minnesota. Her traditional Ojibwe name, given to her by her grandmother, is Esh-quay-gah-bowah-e-quay and means "the last standing woman". She was the first member of her family to complete high school, graduating from Park Rapids High School in 1964.

She started attending Minnesota State University Moorhead in 1968. She earned a Bachelor of Science degree in elementary education at Moorhead, graduating magna cum laude. She earned her M.S. in guidance and counseling from North Dakota State University and a Certificate of Advanced Graduate Study in educational administration. She earned her EdD from Harvard University.

== Career and activism ==
Vizenor worked as a teacher in the White Earth Indian Reservation for 20 years. She taught elementary students at Pine Point School, an alternative school. She also taught classes in Ojibwe language and culture.

Beginning in July 1991, Vizenor led protests against corruption within the tribal government. She and others protested kickbacks related to the then-proposed Shooting Star Casino on the White Earth Indian Reservation, participating in a takeover of the tribal headquarters for which Vizenor and 28 others were arrested. Later that year, she and other White Earth representatives met with an agent of the Bureau of Indian Affairs to discuss the dispersal of funds from the White Earth Land Settlement Act (WELSA). The events led to Camp Justice, a reform movement that lasted five years and concluded with the felony convictions of two council members and of tribal chair Chip Wadena on charges of embezzlement, money laundering, and election rigging.

In 1996, Vizenor was appointed as White Earth's secretary-treasurer. She was elected to the position the following year, serving in that role until 2002. She ran for tribal chair in 2004 against Chip Wadena. She was elected and became the first woman tribal chair of the White Earth Ojibwe.

Vizenor announced her intentions to reform the White Earth tribal constitution in 2007. She was elected to a second term in 2008 and called for a constitutional convention. Among the changes she sought to implement was opening tribal citizenship to lineal descendants instead of the one-fourth blood quantum requirement, a prerequisite also mandated by the Minnesota Chippewa Tribe. The old White Earth constitution lacked separation of powers, an independent judiciary, and contained numerous references to obtaining the permission of the secretary of the interior. Under Vizenor, White Earth was at the heart of a nationwide movement to rewrite tribal constitutions. In 2013, nearly 80% of White Earth voted to adopt the new constitution.

Vizenor also called for the amendment of the constitution of the Minnesota Chippewa Tribe, starting as early as 2008. Her attempts at constitutional reform spurred several attempts to recall her via petition, including twice in 2010. In 2015, members of the governing board of the Minnesota Chippewa Tribe voted to censure her and removed her from the board. She resigned from her position as White Earth's tribal chair on January 20, 2016.

Vizenor wrote the 2016 novel Treaty Shirts: October 2034 — A Familiar Treatise on The White Earth Nation. The novel is set in a dystopian future where reservations are diminished to sectors that serve the commercial interests of a totalitarian federal government. In 2016, she was named president of Leech Lake Tribal College, succeeding interim president Ginny Carney.

== Personal life ==
Erma was married to Dallas Vizenor (d. 1998). She is active within the Episcopal church and participates in Ojibwe language hymn singing. She is related by marriage to Gerald Vizenor.

== See also ==
- List of Native American politicians
- Native American women in politics
