= White Earth Nation =

Native American band in Minnesota, U.S.

Coordinates: 47°5′8″N 95°51′41″W

White Earth Band of the Minnesota Chippewa Tribe
Gaa-waabaabiganikaag Anishinaabeg
- Tribal flag

- White Earth Nation logo

Total population
- 9,726 (2020)

Regions with significant populations
- United States (Minnesota)

Languages
- English, Ojibwe

Related ethnic groups
- Minnesota Chippewa Tribe, other Ojibwe people

The White Earth Band of the Minnesota Chippewa Tribe, also called the White Earth Nation (Ojibwe: Gaa-waabaabiganikaag Anishinaabeg, lit. "People from where there is an abundance of white clay"), is a federally recognized Native American band in northwestern Minnesota. The band's land base is the White Earth Indian Reservation.

With 19,291 members in 2007, the White Earth Band is the largest of the six component bands of the federally recognized Minnesota Chippewa Tribe, formed after the 1934 Indian Reorganization Act. It is also the largest band in Minnesota.

The five other member tribes of the Minnesota Chippewa Tribe are the Bois Forte Band (Nett Lake), Fond du Lac Band, Grand Portage Band, Leech Lake Band, and Mille Lacs Band.

== History ==
White Earth Nation Tribal Headquarters

The White Earth Nation was formed by joining multiple Chippewa bands from north central Minnesota. They had been displaced by European-American settlement and consolidated onto a reservation in Mahnomen, Becker, and Clearwater Counties. Six Minnesota Chippewa bands enroll members separately today, but they combine numbers when identifying the entire tribe. According to the Minnesota Chippewa Tribe council, the White Earth Band had 19,291 enrolled members in July 2007, making it the largest Anishinaabe tribe in the state.

On March 19, 1867, the U.S. Congress established the White Earth Indian Reservation for the Mississippi Chippewa Indians in Minnesota, following the ratification of a treaty between them and the United States. Congress had several session agreements regarding the White Earth Band of Ojibwe. After hearing many complaints about the Pillagers, who were then landless, Congress authorized the relocation of the western Pillagers to the White Earth Indian Reservation. They were not included in the 1855 Treaty of Washington (10 Stat. 1165), which was made with the eastern Pillagers at the Mississippi River headwaters. Eventually, the Otter Tail Pillager Band of Chippewa Indians and Wild Rice River Pembina Band of Chippewa Indians also came to settle alongside the Mississippi Chippewa at White Earth Reservation and effectively became part of the White Earth Band.

These historic bands were:

- Gull Lake Band of Mississippi River Chippewa
- Removable Mille Lacs Indians
- Rabbit Lake Band of Mississippi River Chippewa
- Rice Lake Band of Mississippi River Chippewa.

Until the Indian Reorganization Act of 1934, the six bands living on the White Earth Indian Reservation acted independently of each other. After the Reorganization Act, the six wrote a constitution forming the Minnesota Chippewa Tribe. Minnesota was divided into six tribal districts uniting all Ojibwe bands not associated with the Red Lake Band of Chippewa, and the Pembina band. Both refused to relocate to White Earth, thus maintaining their individual identities.

The tribe was involved in a case about how much compensation the descendants of the Pembina Chippewa should receive from the taking of land by the U.S. government during the early 1800s. The third and final settlement payment in 2022 of $59 million was split among the tribe, the Little Shell Chippewa, the Chippewa Cree, and the Turtle Mountain Tribe of North Dakota, along with the 39,000 individual beneficiaries. Previous settlements in the case were in 1964 and 1980.

== Notable citizens ==
- Kathleen Annette, physician, health administrator
- Clyde Bellecourt, social activist
- Vernon Bellecourt, activist and early leader of the American Indian Movement, founded in Minneapolis
- Charles Albert Bender, athlete and baseball pitcher, elected in 1953 to Baseball Hall of Fame
- Peggy Flanagan, Lieutenant Governor of Minnesota, United States Senator-elect for the State of Minnesota, and former Minnesota State Representative (D-46A)
- Joe Guyon, Professional Football Hall of Fame, College Football Hall of Fame
- Gordon Henry Jr., poet, writer
- Clara Sue Kidwell, Director of the American Indian Center, University of North Carolina at Chapel Hill
- Winona LaDuke, founder of the White Earth Land Recovery Project in 1989, to purchase land for the tribe within the reservation boundaries, work for reforestation, and market traditional products, including wild rice; also two-time Green Party vice presidential nominee.
- Robert Lilligren, first American Indian tribal member to serve on the Minneapolis City Council
- Anne McKeig, attorney and judge, appointed in June 2016 as the first Native American on the Minnesota State Supreme Court
- Jean O'Brien, historian who specializes in northeastern Woodlands American Indian history.
- T. J. Oshie, National Hockey League player and member of the 2014 USA Olympic Men's Hockey team
- Charlie Roy, professional baseball player in 1906
- Anton Treuer, Ojibwe Language advocate and academic
- Erma Vizenor, tribal chair from 2004 to 2016
- Gerald Vizenor, scholar and writer
- Wabanquot (White Cloud), chief in the 19th century
- Chip Wadena, tribal chair from 1976 to 1996
- Joseph Woodbury aka Joseph L. Hole-in-the-Day III (Hole-in-the-Day II's last child and hereditary chief), nominated by Governor Ramsey to West Point. Was on the Haskill Institute football team. University of Minnesota graduate. Served in the 14th Minnesota Infantry during the Spanish-American War. Worked for the Ethological Bureau recording Indigenous lore.

== See also ==
- Superchief, a film about an election for White Earth tribal chairman
