= Chad Smith (politician) =

American lawyer and politician (born 1950)

- ᎤᎩᏍᏔ
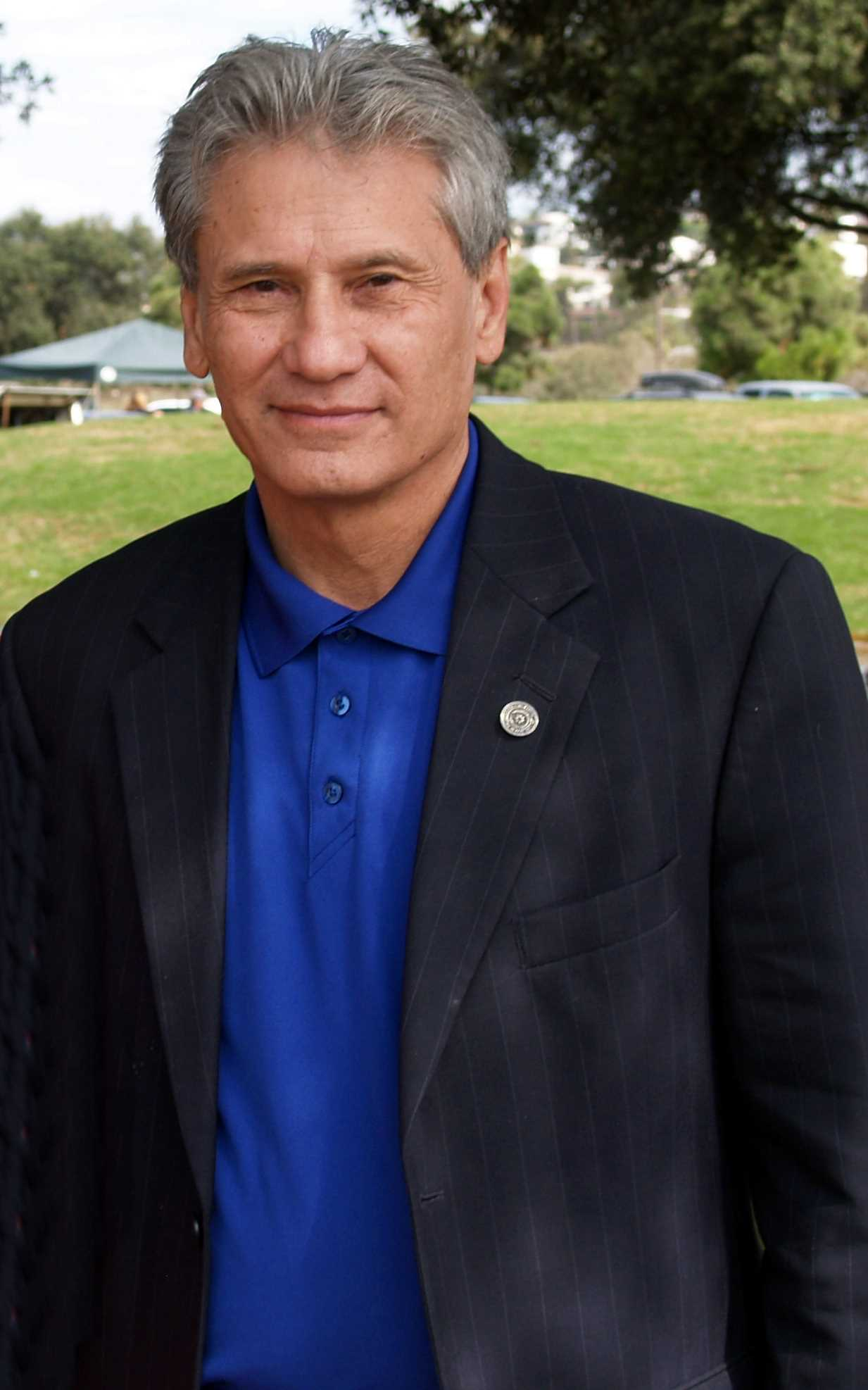
- Smith in 2007

Principal Chief of the Cherokee Nation
- In office 1999–2011
- Preceded by: Joe Byrd
- Succeeded by: Joe Crittenden (acting)

Personal details
- Born: December 17, 1950 (age 75) Pontiac, Michigan, U.S.
- Citizenship: American; Cherokee Nation
- Party: Independent
- Spouse: Bobbie Scott
- Education: University of Georgia (BS); University of Wisconsin, Madison (MPA); University of Tulsa (JD); University of Nevada, Las Vegas (MBA)
- Website: Official website

Chadwick "Corntassel" Smith (Cherokee: ᎤᎩᏍᏔ, romanized: Ugista, derived from Cherokee word for "Corntassel", ᎤᏥᏣᏔ or Utsitsata); born December 17, 1950) is a Cherokee Nation politician and attorney who served as Principal Chief of the Cherokee Nation. He was first elected in 1999. Smith was re-elected to a second term as Chief in 2003 and a third term in June 2007 with 59% of the vote. He was defeated in his attempt to get elected to a fourth term in office by Bill John Baker 54% to 46% in the 2011 election and he lost again to Baker in 2015, receiving 28% of the vote.

== Early life and education ==
Chad Smith was born in Pontiac, Michigan, where his father had gone for work. His parents were Nelson Smith, a Cherokee, and Pauline Smith, (western European ancestry), making Chad Smith 1/2 Cherokee by blood. He grew up in Nashville, Tennessee. As a boy, Smith achieved the rank of Eagle Scout in the Boy Scouts in Nashville.

He grew up with stories of his Cherokee ancestors. He is the great-grandson of Redbird Smith, a Cherokee Nation Senator and a traditionalist who founded the Keetoowah Nighthawk Society, a religious, cultural, and political organization dedicated to reviving the Cherokee way of life. Redbird Smith fought the allotment policy, under which the United States government took more than 7,000,000 acres (28,000 km^{2}) of land from the Cherokee. Rachel Quinton, Chad Smith's grandmother, was a lifelong advocate for the Cherokee people and the treasurer for the United Keetoowah Band of Cherokee Indians.

Smith received a bachelor's degree in education from the University of Georgia in 1973, a master's degree in public administration from the University of Wisconsin in 1975, a Juris Doctor degree from the University of Tulsa in 1980, and an MBA in Hospitality Management from the University of Nevada-Las Vegas in 2008.

== Professional life ==
From 1979 to 1980, Smith served a consultant in Indian Law and Tribal Management to the Cherokee Nation's Tribal Operations. From 1982 to 1986, he served as Assistant District Attorney in Creek County, Oklahoma. On two separate occasions, Smith served as the Estate Tax Attorney of the United States Department of Treasury, from 1980 to 1982 and from 1987 to 1989. He was a prosecutor for the Cherokee Nation during 1985–1995 (during the Wilma Mankiller administration).

From 1989 to 1995 and from 1997 to 1999, he operated a private law practice out of Tulsa, Oklahoma, representing clients in civil rights litigation and appeals, criminal defense, and general civil litigation, with a focus on Indian law. Smith served as an Assistant Public Defender and served as counsel to economically deprived defendants in the District Court of Tulsa County.

Prior to his service as Principal Chief, Smith taught Indian law at Northeastern State University, Rogers State University, and for a semester at Dartmouth College while he was a visiting fellow.

From 1999 to 2011, Smith served as Principal Chief of the Cherokee Nation, the second largest Indian tribe in the United States with more than 285,000 citizens.

Before becoming Principal Chief, Smith taught Indian law at Dartmouth College, Northeastern State University and Rogers State University. He served two previous Cherokee Nation chiefs as Director of Tribal Planning, Legal Historian, Cherokee Nation Prosecutor, Director of Justice and Advisor to the Tribal Tax Commission. He also successfully operated his own law practice, served Tulsa County as an assistant public defender and worked as an assistant district attorney in Creek County.

== Political career ==
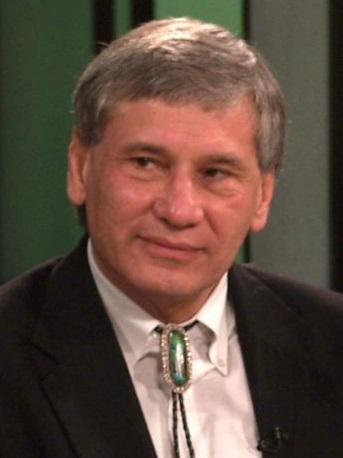
Chad Smith, 2007

Smith completed his third 4-year term as Principal Chief of the Cherokee Nation in 2011. The Principal Chief is the head of the executive branch of the tribal government. The position is responsible for the execution of the laws of the Cherokee Nation, establishment of tribal policy, and delegation of authority for the day-to-day operations of the tribe. Before his election, Smith served under two Cherokee Nation chiefs as Director of Tribal Planning, Legal Historian, Attorney, Cherokee Nation Prosecutor, Director of Justice and adviser to the tribal tax commission.

Smith was elected Principal Chief on July 24, 1999, defeating the incumbent Principal Chief Joe Byrd in a runoff election. Byrd's first term was marked with tension and constitutional crisis issues. Smith received 7,204 votes (56.48%) to Byrd's 5,552 votes (43.52%). During his first term, Hastings Shade, a Cherokee traditionalist, language teacher, artist, and author, served as deputy chief.

Smith was re-elected to subsequent terms in 2003 and 2007, with Joe Grayson as deputy chief, who is a bilingual, full-blood community organizer and military veteran.

In 2006, Smith supported amending the constitution of the Cherokee Nation to restrict citizenship to those having "Indian blood". This action expelled about 2,800 people from the tribe who were known as the Cherokee freedmen, as they were descended from people who had been enslaved by Cherokees rather than being Cherokee by blood. Smith argued that since the Cherokee were a sovereign nation, they could establish their own rules for qualification of citizenship. The action was contrary to a post–Civil War treaty that said the Nation had given full citizenship rights to the formerly enslaved people, and was disputed in both U.S. federal courts and Cherokee Nation courts.

Smith ran for a fourth term in 2011. His running mate was Chris Soap, son of Charlie Soap, husband of the late Principal Chief Wilma Mankiller. He was challenged by Bill John Baker, who supported inclusion of descendants of freedmen in the tribe. The election was held on June 25, 2011. Both candidates have twice been declared the winner, because voting was so close. Because the results could not be determined with mathematical certainty, the Cherokee Nation Supreme Court ordered a second vote for Sept. 24, 2011. As the Cherokee Nation constitution does not allow elected officials to remain in office past Inauguration Day, Smith left office on Aug. 14, 2011. S. Joe Crittenden was sworn in as deputy chief, and elevated to acting principal chief in accordance with the constitutional chain of succession.

During his tenure as principal chief, Smith focused on three initiatives: economic self-reliance for the tribe, Cherokee language and cultural revitalization, and community development in Northeastern Oklahoma. Language immersion programs for Cherokee children and youth have been established. Smith popularized the term gadugi, which in Cherokee refers to the spontaneous work crews communities formed as needs arose. It has come to mean coming together to work for the good of all Cherokee.

The modern Cherokee Nation has had steady economic growth. During Smith's tenure, agricultural growth, and business, corporate, real estate expansion occurred. Some has been funded by revenues from numerous casino operations. The Cherokee Nation controls Cherokee Nation Entertainment, a gaming and hospitality company with several thousand employees in Eastern Oklahoma, as well as Cherokee Nation Industries, a defense contractor. .

Since 1992 the Cherokee Nation has served as the lead tribe for the Inter-Tribal Environmental Council (ITEC). The mission of ITEC is to protect the health of Native Americans, their natural resources, and their environment as it relates to air, land, and water. To accomplish this mission, ITEC provides technical support, training and environmental services in a variety of environmental disciplines. There are 39 ITEC member tribes in Oklahoma, New Mexico, and Texas.

In February 2021, the Supreme Court of the Cherokee Nation rejected the citizenship restriction that had been passed at the instigation of Smith, saying "The 'by blood' language found within the Cherokee Nation Constitution, and any laws which flow from that language, is illegal, obsolete, and repugnant to the ideal of liberty. These words insult and degrade the descendants of the Freedman much like the Jim Crow laws found lingering on the books in Southern states some fifty-seven years after the passage of the 1964 Civil Rights Act." The restriction had also been rejected in a U.S. district court in 2017.

== Post-Chief Career (2011–present) ==
=== Legal Practice ===
Since leaving the office of Principal Chief in 2011, Smith has maintained an active legal practice in Indian law and employment litigation under his firm Chad Smith Law. In August 2022, Smith served as lead counsel in Comingdeer v. Cherokee Nation, CV 2016-180, described as the first civil jury trial held in Cherokee Nation in approximately 120 years. A six-member jury unanimously awarded his client, tribal whistleblower David Comingdeer, $615,000 after finding the Cherokee Nation had violated Comingdeer's freedom of speech and created intolerable working conditions that led to his constructive discharge. Smith argued that Comingdeer had been retaliated against for reporting the tribe's mismanagement of a federal firefighting grant that employed 25 tribal members.

=== Attorney General, Pawnee Nation of Oklahoma (2020–2024) ===
From February 2020 to June 2024, Smith served as Attorney General of the Pawnee Nation of Oklahoma. In that role, he provided legal counsel to the Pawnee Business Council on governance, litigation, gaming, Indian child welfare, and election law. The Pawnee Nation's President publicly commended Smith's "fine legal work" in Whiteshirt v. Election Commission, in which the Pawnee Nation Supreme Court upheld a tribal recall election result that Smith defended.

=== Director of the Tribal Justice Project, UC Davis School of Law (2020–2021) ===
In August 2020, Smith was appointed Director of the Tribal Justice Project at the University of California, Davis School of Law (King Hall). UC Davis Law announced his appointment as part of its 2020–21 faculty additions, noting that the project sought to enhance tribal sovereignty through training for tribal judges and court personnel and by establishing an intertribal appellate court at the law school. Smith held the directorship until October 2021.

=== Lecturer, California State University San Marcos (2024) ===
In fall 2024 (August–December), Smith served as a Lecturer at California State University San Marcos, where he taught an introductory course in Federal Indian Law to undergraduate students.

=== In-House Attorney, Winnebago Tribe of Nebraska (2025–present) ===
Beginning in June 2025, Smith has served as In-House Attorney for the Winnebago Tribe of Nebraska, advising the tribal governing council on governance, litigation, environmental matters, gaming, Indian child welfare, and leasing issues. His appointment with the Tribe is confirmed in a December 2025 U.S. Environmental Protection Agency filing that lists him as the Tribe's in-house attorney.

== Works ==
=== Cherokee Nation: Proceed Undaunted (2025) ===
In January 2025, Smith published Cherokee Nation: Proceed Undaunted through Amazon Publishing. The 733-page work is described as a legal commentary on the Cherokee Nation's constitutional history, chronicling the Nation's development from its first written constitution in 1827 through modern amendments, including key events such as the Trail of Tears, the Treaty of New Echota, and the 2021 Nash case. Drawing on his experience as a constitutional law attorney and former Principal Chief, Smith analyzes episodes of corruption and governance failure as a case study in tribal nation building.

=== The Language of Life (2026) ===
In early 2026, Smith published The Language of Life: Inspiring Stories About Rescue Dogs Rescuing Humans through Amazon Publishing. The work is a collection of interconnected stories exploring how rescue dogs emotionally and physically rescue human beings, framed through the life of a veterinarian named Arch. The book draws on Cherokee teachings that at the beginning of time all living beings shared a universal language rooted in respect, balance, and reciprocity. The book was highlighted by the Cherokee 411 community publication.

== Family ==
Smith is married to Bobbie Gail Smith, a full-blooded Cherokee from the Rocky Mountain community of Adair County, Oklahoma.

== Bibliography ==
- Smith, Chadwick Corntassel and Rennard Strickland with Benny Smith. ᎥᎪᏢᏍᎬ ᏌᏊ ᎠᏥᎸ: Building One Fire, Art and World View in Cherokee Life. Norman: University of Oklahoma Press, 2010. ISBN 978-1-61658-960-8.
- McClinton, Rowena and Chad Smith. The Moravian Springplace Mission to the Cherokees. Lincoln: University of Nebraska Press, 2007. ISBN 978-0-8032-3266-2.
- Robert J. Conley, author, David Fitzgerald, photography, and Chadwick Smith, introduction. Cherokee. Portland, OR: Graphic Arts Center Publishing Co., 2002. ISBN 9781558686038.
- Smith, Chadwick Corntassel. Leadership Lessons from the Cherokee Nation: Learn From All I Observe. McGraw-Hill, 2013. ISBN 978-0-0718-0883-5 .

Political offices
Preceded by Joe Byrd	Principal Chief of the Cherokee Nation; 1999–2011	Succeeded by Joe Crittenden; Acting
