= Frankie Hargis =

Cherokee politician (1965-2021)

Cherokee Nation Tribal Councilor for the 7th district
- In office 2011 – November 2018
- Preceded by: Joe Crittenden
- Succeeded by: Canaan Duncan

Personal details
- Born: July 19, 1965 Claremore, Oklahoma, U.S.
- Died: August 15, 2021 (aged 56)
- Citizenship: Cherokee Nation; United States
- Children: 2
- Education: Northeastern State University

Frankie Darlene Hargis (July 19, 1965 – August 15, 2021) was a Cherokee politician who served as the registrar of the Cherokee Nation from 2018 to 2021. She was previously a member of the tribal council representing District 7 from 2011 to 2018.

== Life ==
Hargis was born July 19, 1965, in Claremore, Oklahoma and raised in Stilwell. She graduated from Stilwell High School and later earned a B.A. in education from Northeastern State University.

Hargis worked for the Cherokee Nation and Cherokee Nation Enterprises in various capacities. In 2006, Hargas supported limiting Cherokee citizenship to those with Cherokee blood, arguing that Freedmen, descendants of former slaves, should also be excluded. She backed the Cherokee Nation tribal council's amendment requiring Indian blood for citizenship.

Her political career began in 2011 when she was elected to the tribal council in a special election, representing District 7 (western Adair County). She succeeded Joe Crittenden. Hargis was re-elected in 2013 and again in 2017. During her tenure, she secured $80,000 for a domestic violence shelter in Stilwell, $4.2 million for a child development center in Stilwell, $11 million for the expansion of the Wilma P. Mankiller Clinic, and $1 million for roads and bridges in Adair County. She sponsored 333 pieces of legislation. In November 2018, Hargis resigned from her Tribal Council seat after being selected by principal chief Bill John Baker to become the Cherokee Nation's Registrar. Canaan Duncan won a special election to serve the rest of Hargis council term. She held the registrar position until her death.

Hargis had two sons. She died unexpectedly in Stilwell on August 15, 2021, at the age of 56.

== See also ==
- List of Native American politicians
- Native American women in politics
