= The Cherokee Word for Water =

- Directed by: Tim Kelly; Charlie Soap
- Written by: Louise Rubacky; Gary Miranda; Tim Kelly
- Starring: Kimberly Guerrero; Mo Brings Plenty; Steve Reevis; Darryl Tonemah; Zahn McClarnon; Deanna Dunagan
- Cinematography: Lisa Leone
- Edited by: Louise Rubacky
- Release date: 2013
- Running time: 98 minutes
- Country: United States

The Cherokee Word for Water is a 2013 American drama film directed by Tim Kelly and Charlie Soap. Starring Kimberly Guerrero and Mo Brings Plenty in the lead roles, the film portrays the efforts of activist and future Cherokee chief Wilma Mankiller to create a stable water supply to Bell, Oklahoma.

== Premise ==
"The docudrama, directed by Wilma’s husband and longtime community development partner, Charlie Soap, follows a young Mankiller as she works to bring water to the rural, primarily Cherokee community of Bell, Ok." "...Together with a community of volunteers they build nearly 20 miles of waterline to save the community. The successful completion of the waterline led to Mankiller's election as principal chief, her and Soap's marriage and sparked a movement of similar self-help projects across the CN and in Indian Country that continues today."

== Production ==
Filming started in September 2011 and took four weeks to complete, with shooting taking place in the Tahlequah urban area. In addition to privately-raised capital and funds from the Wilma Mankiller Foundation, the film also received a rebate from the Oklahoma state government.

== Reception ==
In a study by the American Indian Film Institute, which operates the American Indian Film Festival, the film was voted the best American Indian film made in the past forty years. It also won a Bronze Wrangler for Best Theatrical Film from the National Cowboy & Western Heritage Museum in 2014.
