= Kimberly Norris Guerrero =

American advocate and actress (born 1967)

- Born: Kimberly Norris; 1967 (age 58–59); Oklahoma
- Other name: Kimberly Guerrero
- Citizenship: Confederated Tribes of the Colville Reservation, American
- Occupations: Actress, screenwriter, college professor
- Years active: 1988–present
- Notable work: The Cherokee Word for Water
- Spouse: Johnny Guerrero (m. 1996)

Kimberly Norris Guerrero (née Norris; born 1967) is an American actress and screenwriter. She has more than two dozen screen appearances, generally playing roles of Indigenous women. Norris played Gen. Custer's American Indian wife in the movie Son of the Morning Star, and guest starred in TV shows such as Walker, Texas Ranger, Longmire, Grey's Anatomy, IT: Welcome To Derry and Seinfeld. She appeared in the well received mini-series, 500 Nations, and twice played Cherokee Nation Chief Wilma Mankiller. Norris-Guerrero is also a college professor, motivational speaker, Native American activist, and co-founder of two non-profit organizations aimed at aiding youth in Native American communities.

== Early life ==
Norris is a citizen of the Confederated Tribes of the Colville Reservation. She was born in 1967 in Oklahoma to Linda Standing Cloud. After being adopted by the Norris family at the age of five months, she was raised in Idabel, Oklahoma. Her adopted parents exposed her at an early age to the Native American culture that was her heritage. Her mother, Kay Norris, ensured that she started learning native dance and song from the local Choctaw community by the age of six. As a high school student, Norris was a cheerleader, and also won the title of Miss Oklahoma Teen at the 1985 statewide pageant. She went on to win the National Teen title that year. She graduated from Idabel High School soon after, and, wanting to be close to Hollywood in order to fulfill a childhood dream of acting, attended UCLA, where she obtained a degree in History.

== Entertainment career ==
=== Acting ===
Norris' acting debut came in 1991 in the mini-series, Son of the Morning Star, where she played the character Kate Bighead, Gen. George Armstrong Custer's American Indian wife. Her next role came with help from her university mentor, Professor Hanay Geiogamah, on the soap opera As The World Turns, followed by an appearance in the TNT network's mini-series, Geronimo.

Norris played two different characters in the long running A&E drama, Longmire, and she was Sheriff Nina White in ABC's prime-time TV soap, Blood & Oil. She is perhaps best known for playing the role of Winona, Jerry Seinfeld's Native American girlfriend, in "The Cigar Store Indian" episode of the NBC network series, Seinfeld. She has appeared and guest starred in many popular TV series, including: Charmed, The Sopranos, Grey's Anatomy, Bones, and Walker, Texas Ranger. She starred with Ernest Borgnine in the first offering of the Frozen Stupid TV movie franchise and again in the film, Barn Red. She played Bernice Blackburn in the first season of the Amazon Prime Video series, The Wilds (2020).

Noted film credits include a recurring role in 1995's eight part mini-series, 500 Nations, and the pivotal role of Cherokee Nation chief, Wilma Mankiller, in The Cherokee Word for Water (2013). Her depiction of Mankiller was praised by Chief Mankiller's friend and female activist, Gloria Steinem.

=== Screenwriting ===
Norris is widening her role in the entertainment business and has been, in addition to acting and teaching, working as a screenwriter since 1999 to help change the stereotypical depictions of Native Americans in Hollywood. Norris-Guerrero wrote and directed the 2001 short film, Standing Cloud, which features her niece, actress-artist Nathalie Standingcloud.

=== Theatre ===
Norris has appeared in numerous stage productions, including those at the off-Broadway Public Theater; Steppenwolf Theatre, Chicago; Royal National Theatre, London; San Diego's Old Globe; and Broadway. One of her most significant roles on stage was originating the part of the Native American housekeeper Johnna Monevata, in the initial two-year run of the Tony Award winning play, August: Osage County, first presented by the Steppenwolf Theatre Company in Chicago, on Broadway, in London and in Sydney.

== Career in academia ==
As of September 2025, Norris-Guerrero is a professor in the Department of Theatre, Film, and Digital Production at the University of California, Riverside, where she also serves as a Graduate Advisor for Screenwriters and Playwrights in UCR's MFA Program for Creative Writing and Writing for the Performing Arts.

== Personal life ==
Norris is married to actor and music composer, Johnny Guerrero. They reside in Southern California. She is an enrolled reservation member of the Colville Indian tribe, and also has Salish–Kootenai heritage. She is the sister-in-law of UCLA's former-athletic director, Dan Guerrero.

Norris and her husband helped co-found the Akatubi Film and Music Academy, which was started to aid in the training of Native and non-Native youth residing in tribal communities who are interested in careers in the film and music industries. The StyleHorse Collective, designed to relate the life stories of Indigenous communities and individuals through film, music, and online production, was also co-founded by Norris.

== Awards ==
Norris has been a finalist for the Rockefeller New Media Fellowship, The ABC-Disney Television Writing Fellowship, and the Humanitas Award in Screenwriting.

== Filmography ==
=== Film ===
Year	Title	Role	Notes
1988	My Neighbor Totoro	Chorus voices	Animated film
1998	Naturally Native	Kimberly Norris Guerrero	Comedy-drama
2001	Escanaba in da Moonlight	Wolf Moon Dance Soady	Comedy film
2001	Folly Island	Anne	Comedy film
2003	Dreamkeeper	Pretty woman	
2003	American Indian Graffiti: This Thing Life	Aunt Kay	
2004	Memory	Charleen	Independent short
2004	Hidalgo	Frank's Mother	
2004	Barn Red	Lydia Bailey	Co-starring with Ernest Borgnine
2009	Taking Chances	Mary Born Kicking	Comedy
2012	Dogman	Francis Wellman	Horror film
2013	The Cherokee Word for Water	Wilma Mankiller	
2014	Dogman 2: The Wrath of the Litter	Francis Wellman	
2014	The Jingle Dress	Janet	
2015	The Revenant	Indian	Uncredited role
2018	A Wrinkle in Time	Camazotz woman	Uncredited role
2020	The Glorias	Wilma Mankiller	
2020	The Dark Divide	Teresa	
2021	Catch the Fair One	Jaya	
2021	Montana Story	Valentina	

=== Television ===
Year	Title	Role	Notes
1991	Son of the Morning Star	Kate Bighead Custer	TV mini-series
1992	As the World Turns	Simone Bordeau	1 episode
1993	Northern Exposure	Bonnie Norell	Episode: "Heal Thyself" (S5.E8)
1993	Geronimo	Herself	TV film
1993	Seinfeld	Winona	Episode: "The Cigar Store Indian"
1994	Knight Rider 2010	Maria	Made for TV movie
1995	500 Nations		TV miniseries, episodes: "Clash of Cultures" "The Ancestors"
1996	Raven Hawk	Rhyia's Mother	Made for TV movie
1997	Vanishing Point	Connie	Made for TV movie
2000	The Lost Child	Dorrine	Made for TV movie
2000	Walker, Texas Ranger	Leona Gentry	Episode: "White Buffalo"
2001	Charmed	Isabel Lightfeather	Episode: "The Good, the Bad and the Cursed"
2004	The Sopranos	Dealer #1	Episode: "Sentimental Education"
2008	Frozen Stupid	Stormy	TV movie
2010	Grey's Anatomy	Lindsay McNeil	Episode: "Slow Night, So Long"
2010	American Indian Actors	Herself	Documentary short
2012–2014	Longmire	Joanna	Episode: "Dogs, Horses and Indians"
2012–2014	Longmire	Neena Wapasha	Episode: "Miss Cheyenne"
2015	Blood & Oil	Sheriff Nina White	2 episodes: "Art of the Deal," "Departures"
2016	Bones	Alice Tuuq	Episode: "The Stiff in the Cliff"
2019	Republic of Sarah	Mary	Made for TV movie
2019	Shadow Wolves	Naomi	Made for TV movie
2020	Frozen Stupid 2: Open Water	Stormy	Made for TV movie
2020	The Wilds	Bernice Blackburn	Episode: "Day Twenty-Two"
2020	Rutherford Falls	Renee Thomas	Episode: "Terry Thomas"
2021–2023	Reservation Dogs	Auntie B	Recurring role
2022–2024	Spirit Rangers	Mom	Voice
2024	Outer Range	Falling Star	Guest role
2025–present	It: Welcome to Derry	Rose	Recurring role

== See also ==
- List of Native American actors
