= Frozen Stupid =

2008 television film

- TV film poster
- Genre: comedy
- Written by: Richard Brauer
- Directed by: Richard Brauer
- Starring: Ernest Borgnine; Joey Albright; Kimberly Norris; Michelle Mountain; Randall Godwin; Will David Young
- Country of origin: United States
- Original language: English

Production
- Producer: Richard Brauer
- Editor: Jeffrey T. Morgan
- Running time: 102 minutes

Original release
- Release: August 2008

Frozen Stupid is a 2008 comedy television film starring Ernest Borgnine, Joey Albright, and Kimberly Norris, with Michelle Mountain, Randall Godwin, and Will David Young. The film was directed, written, and produced by Richard Brauer. It was followed in 2020 by a sequel Frozen Stupid 2: Open Water.

== Plot ==
On a snowy Saturday, in a midwestern winter landscape, Tony Norgard desperately wants to go ice fishing. But he is pressured to attend his mother-in-law's birthday party on the same day. To resolve the dilemma, Tony pretends to be sick and stays in bed. While his little white lie allows him the chance for a secret outing, it comes with a heavy price. Through the day, misfortune seems to meet him at every turn. When he meets up with his dad Frank, things get worse. Tony's lie seems to have put a curse on what should otherwise have been a simple day of fishing for everyone. Unaware of the charade, Tony's wife Lila happily goes about her day, sorry that her husband is at home, sick in bed, missing a great weekend of family fun. Tony befriends the spirited and very independent Stormy, a beautiful, yet rugged ice fisher woman. Stormy becomes one of the many unusual characters Tony meets in this frozen lake community of anglers. Through it all, even Tony is dwarfed by the magnitude of his compounding troubles. But he is an optimistic man and in his own way tries to put the best spin on the mess he has created. With hopeful confidence, Lila somehow manages to see past his ice-fishing antics. She remembers the honorable man she married, and armed with large amounts of grace, remains supportive. This comedy tells the tale of a cantankerous father and his bumbling but well-meaning son who share a joyous obsession for the age-old art of ice fishing.

== Reception ==
Dove.org said, "This aptly-named comedy starts off slowly, but soon finds its pace."
