= Wilma Mankiller =

Cherokee Nation chief and activist (1945–2010)

- ᎠᏥᎳᏍᎩ ᎠᏍᎦᏯᏗᎯ
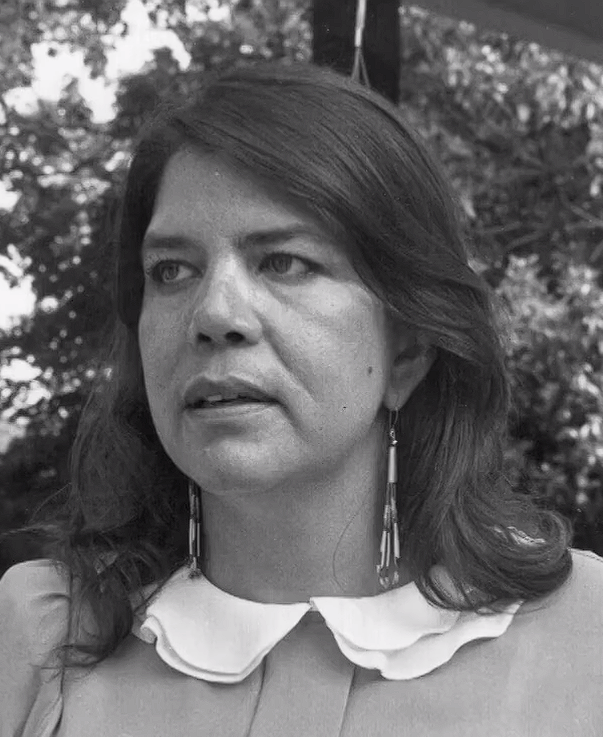
- Mankiller in 2001

Principal Chief of the Cherokee Nation
- In office December 14, 1985 – August 14, 1995
- Preceded by: Ross Swimmer
- Succeeded by: Joe Byrd

Personal details
- Born: Wilma Pearl Mankiller; November 18, 1945 Tahlequah, Oklahoma, U.S.
- Died: April 6, 2010 (aged 64) near Tahlequah, Oklahoma, U.S.
- Citizenship: American; Cherokee Nation
- Party: Democratic
- Other political affiliations: Red Power
- Education: Skyline College; San Francisco State University (BA); University of Arkansas

Wilma Pearl Mankiller (Cherokee: ᎠᏥᎳᏍᎩ ᎠᏍᎦᏯᏗᎯ, romanized: Atsilasgi Asgayadihi; November 18, 1945 – April 6, 2010) was a Native American activist, social worker, community developer and the first woman elected to serve as Principal Chief of the Cherokee Nation. Born in Tahlequah, Oklahoma, she lived on her family's allotment in Adair County, Oklahoma, until the age of 11, when her family relocated to San Francisco as part of a federal government program to urbanize Indigenous Americans. After high school, she married a well-to-do Ecuadorian and raised two daughters. Inspired by the social and political movements of the 1960s, Mankiller became involved in the Occupation of Alcatraz and later participated in the land and compensation struggles with the Pit River Tribe. For five years in the early 1970s, she was employed as a social worker, focusing mainly on children's issues.

When Mankiller returned to Oklahoma in 1976, the Cherokee Nation hired her as an economic stimulus coordinator. With her expertise at preparing documentation, she became a successful grant writer, and by the early 1980s was directing the newly created Community Development Department of the Cherokee Nation. As Director she designed and supervised innovative community projects allowing rural citizens to identify their own challenges and, through their labor, participate in solving them. Her project in Bell, Oklahoma, was featured in the movie The Cherokee Word for Water, directed by Charlie Soap and Tim Kelly. In 2015, the movie was selected as the top American Indian film of the past 40 years by the American Indian Film Institute. Her project in Kenwood received the Department of Housing and Urban Development's Certificate of National Merit.

Her management ability came to the notice of the incumbent Principal Chief, Ross Swimmer, who invited her to run as his deputy in the 1983 tribal elections. When the duo won, she became the first elected woman to serve as Deputy Chief of the Cherokee Nation. She was elevated to Principal Chief when Swimmer took a position in the federal administration of the Bureau of Indian Affairs, serving until 1995. During her administration, the Cherokee government built new health clinics, created a mobile eye-care clinic, established ambulance services, and created early education, adult education and job training programs. She developed revenue streams, including factories, retail stores, restaurants and bingo operations, while establishing self-governance, allowing the tribe to manage its own finances.

Mankiller returned to her activist role as an advocate working to improve the image of Native Americans and combat the misappropriation of native heritage, by authoring books including a bestselling autobiography, Mankiller: A Chief and Her People, and giving numerous lectures on health care, tribal sovereignty, women's rights and cancer awareness after retiring from politics. Throughout her life, she had serious health problems, including polycystic kidney disease, myasthenia gravis, lymphoma and breast cancer, and needed two kidney transplants. She died in 2010 from pancreatic cancer, and was honored with many local, state and national awards, including the nation's highest civilian honor, the Presidential Medal of Freedom.

In 2021 it was announced that Mankiller's likeness would appear on the quarter-dollar coin as a part of the United States Mint's "American Women quarters" program.

== Early life (1945–1955) ==
Wilma Pearl Mankiller was born on November 18, 1945, in the Hastings Indian Hospital in Tahlequah, Oklahoma, to Clara Irene (née Sitton) and Charley Mankiller. Mankiller was 1/2 Cherokee by blood, as her father was a full-blood, and a descendent of Jackson Mankiller of Turnip Mountain, Cherokee Nation East (where Big Cabin and Rattling Gourd, ancestor of her father's uncle, Looney Gourd, were chiefs in 1922). His ancestors were forced to relocate to Indian Territory from Tennessee over the Trail of Tears in the 1830s. Her mother descended from Dutch-Irish and English immigrants who had first settled in Virginia and North Carolina in the 1700s. Her maternal grandparents came to Oklahoma in the early 1900s from Georgia and Arkansas, respectively. (Note: In her autobiography, Wilma Mankiller wrote that her maternal great grandparents William and Sarah Sitton, had migrated from North Carolina to Georgia and in 1891 had settled in Wauhillau, Indian Territory, bringing their son Robert Bailey Sitton with them. In 1903, Robert met and married Pearl Halady, who was in Indian Territory visiting friends. Pearl was from Washington County, Arkansas, where she lived with her half-sister, Ida Mae Scism Jordan. Robert and Pearl's youngest child, Clara Irene Sitton, Wilma's mother, was born on September 18, 1921, in Rocky Mountain, Oklahoma.) The surname "Mankiller", Asgaya-dihi (Cherokee syllabary: ᎠᏍᎦᏯᏗᎯ) in the Cherokee language, refers to a traditional Cherokee military rank, similar to a captain or major, or a shaman with the ability to avenge wrongs through spiritual methods. Alternative spellings are Outacity and Ontassetè. Wilma's given Cherokee name, meaning flower, was A-ji-luhsgi. When Charley and Irene married in 1937, they settled on Charley's father, John Mankiller's (Note: Also in Mankiller's autobiography, she wrote that her paternal great-great grandfather was Ka-skun-nee Mankiller, who established the family surname. Ka-skun-nee married Lucy Matoy with whom he had several children; one of whom was Jacob Mankiller, born in 1853. Jacob married Susan Teehee-Bearpaw and their oldest child was John Mankiller, Wilma's grandfather. John married Bettie Bolin Bendabout Canoe, whose Cherokee name was Quatie. John and Quatie, had a son, Charley, born November 15, 1914, who was Wilma's father.) allotment, known as "Mankiller Flats", near Rocky Mountain in Adair County, Oklahoma, which he had received in 1907 as part of the government policy of forced assimilation for Native American people. Mankiller's father, Charley, and his uncle, Looney Gourd, built the house where she grew up.

Wilma had five older siblings: Louis Donald "Don", Frieda Marie, Robert Charles, Frances Kay and John David. In 1948, when she was three, the family moved into a house built by her father, her uncle and her brother, Don, on the allotment of her grandfather John. Her five other siblings, Linda Jean, Richard Colson, Vanessa Lou, James Ray and William Edward, were born over the next 12 years. The small house had no electricity or plumbing and they lived in "extreme poverty". The family hunted and fished, maintaining a vegetable garden to feed themselves. They also grew peanuts and strawberries, which they sold. Mankiller went to school through the fifth grade in a three-room schoolhouse, in Rocky Mountain. The family spoke both English and Cherokee at home; even Mankiller's mother spoke Cherokee. Her mother canned food and used flour sacks to make clothes for the children, whom she immersed in Cherokee heritage. Though they joined the Baptist church, the children were wary of white congregants and customs, preferring to attend tribal ceremonial gatherings. Family elders taught the children traditional stories.

== Relocation to San Francisco (1956–1976) ==
In 1955, a severe drought made it more difficult for the family to provide for itself. As a part of the Indian termination policy, the Indian Relocation Act of 1956 provided assistance to relocate Native families to urban areas. Agents from the Bureau of Indian Affairs promised better jobs and living conditions for families that agreed to move. In 1956, when she was 11, her father Charley was denied a loan from the BIA, and decided that moving to a city where he would have a regular income and a steady job would be good for his family. The family chose California because Irene's mother lived in Riverbank. Selling their belongings, they took a train from Stilwell, Oklahoma, to San Francisco. Though they were promised an apartment in the city, there were no apartments available when the Mankillers arrived. They were housed in a squalid hotel in the Tenderloin District for several weeks. Even when the family moved to Potrero Hill, where both her father and brother Don found work, the family struggled financially. They had few Native American neighbors, creating alienation from their tribal identities.

Mankiller and her siblings enrolled in school, but it was difficult as the other students made fun of her surname and teased her about her clothes and the way she spoke. Mankiller withdrew from school due to her classmates' treatment. Within a year, the family had saved money and were able to move to Daly City, but Mankiller still felt alienated and ran away from home, going to her grandmother's farm in Riverbank. Although her grandmother made her return to Potrero, Wilma continued to run away, and her parents decided to let her live on the farm for a year. By the time she returned, the family had moved again and were living in Hunters Point, a neighborhood riddled with crime, drugs and gangs. Though she had regained her confidence during her year away, Mankiller still felt isolated and began to become involved in the activities of the San Francisco Indian Center. She remained indifferent to school, where she struggled with math and science, but graduated from high school in June 1963.

As soon as she finished school, Mankiller found a clerical job in a finance company and moved in with her sister Frances. That summer, at a Latin dance, she met Hector Hugo Olaya de Bardi, an Ecuadorian college student from a well-to-do family, and the two began dating. Mankiller found him sophisticated, and despite her parents' discomfort with the union, the two married in Reno, Nevada, on November 13, 1963, and then honeymooned in Chicago. Returning to California, they moved into an apartment in the Mission District, where 10 months later their daughter Felicia was born. They then moved to a house in a nearby neighborhood and in 1966 had a second daughter, Gina. While Olaya continued with his schooling at San Francisco State University and worked for Pan American Airlines, Mankiller was busy raising their daughters. Olaya saw his role as the family's provider, leaving his wife at home to bring up the children. But Mankiller was restless and returned to school, enrolling in classes at Skyline Junior College. For the first time, she enjoyed school and took only courses that interested her.

=== Activism ===
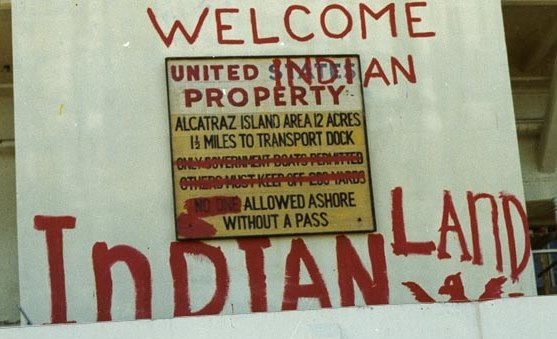
Alcatraz Occupation "Welcome to Indian Land" graffiti

In 1964, a small group of Red Power activists occupied Alcatraz Island for a few hours. In the late 1960s, a group of students from the University of California at Berkeley, Los Angeles and Santa Cruz, along with students at San Francisco State, began protesting against the Vietnam War and in favor of civil rights for ethnic minorities and women. Among the groups that sprang up in the period was the American Indian Movement (AIM), which in San Francisco was centered around the activities at the San Francisco Indian Center. Also meeting there was the United Bay Indian Council, which operated as an umbrella organization for 30 separate groups representing people of different tribal affiliations. In October 1969, the Center burned, and the loss of their meeting place created a bond between administrators and student activists, who combined their efforts to bring the plight of urban Native Americans to the public eye with the reoccupation of Alcatraz.

The occupation inspired Mankiller to become involved in civil rights activism. Prior to the November takeover of the island, she had not been involved in either AIM or the United Bay Council. She began to meet with other Native Americans who had participated in the Indian Center, becoming active in the groups supporting the Occupation. While she did visit Alcatraz, most of her work focused on fundraising and support, gathering supplies of blankets, food and water for those on the island. Soon after the Occupation began, Charley Mankiller was diagnosed with kidney disease, which caused Mankiller to discover that she shared polycystic kidney disease with her father. In between her activism, school and family obligations, she spent as much time with him as she was able. The Occupation lasted 19 months, and during that time, Mankiller learned organizational skills and how to do paralegal research. She had been encouraged by other activists to continue her studies, and began planning a career.

=== Social work ===
On her father's death in 1971, the Mankiller family returned to Oklahoma for his burial. When she returned to California, she transferred to San Francisco State University in 1972 and began to focus her classes on social welfare. Against her husband's wishes, she bought her own car and began to seek independence, taking her daughters to Native American events along the West Coast. On her travels, she met members of the Pit River Tribe in Northern California, near Burney, and joined their campaign for compensation with the Indian Claims Commission and Pacific Gas and Electric Company for lands illegally taken from the tribe during the California Gold Rush. Over the next five years, she assisted the tribe in raising funds for its legal defense and helped prepare documentation for their claim, gaining experience in international and treaty law.

Closer to home, Mankiller founded East Oakland's Native American Youth Center, where she served as director. Locating a building, she called for volunteers to paint and help draft educational programs to help youth learn about their heritage, enjoying overwhelming support from the community. In 1974, Mankiller and Olaya divorced and she moved with her two daughters to Oakland. Taking a position as a social worker with the Urban Indian Resource Center, she worked on programs conducting research on child abuse and neglect, foster care, and adoption of Native children. Recognizing that most indigenous children were placed with families with no knowledge of Native traditions, she worked on legislation with other staff and attorneys to prevent children from being removed from their culture. The law, which eventually passed as the Indian Child Welfare Act, made it illegal to place Native children in non-Native families.

== Return to Oklahoma ==
Map of contemporary Cherokee Nation Tribal Jurisdiction Area (red)

=== Community development (1976–1983) ===
In 1976, Mankiller's mother returned to Oklahoma, prompting Mankiller to move as well with her two daughters. Initially, she was unable to find work and moved back to California for six months. By the fall, she was back in Oklahoma, and built a small house near her mother's in Mankiller Flats. After doing volunteer work for the Cherokee Nation, Mankiller was hired in 1977 to work on a program for young Cherokees to study environmental science. That same year she enrolled in additional classes at Flaming Rainbow University in Stilwell, Oklahoma, completing her Bachelor of Science degree in social sciences with an emphasis on Indian Affairs, thanks to a correspondence course under a program offered by the Union for Experimental Colleges in Washington, D.C. She enrolled in graduate courses in community development at the University of Arkansas, in Fayetteville, while continuing to work in the tribal offices as an economic stimulus coordinator. She worked on home health care, the Indian child welfare protocols, language services, a senior citizens program and a youth shelter.

On November 9, 1979, on her way back to Tahlequah from Fayetteville, Mankiller's vehicle was struck by an oncoming car. Sherry Morris, one of Mankiller's closest friends, was driving the other vehicle and died in the crash. Mankiller suffered broken ribs as well as breaks in her left leg and ankle, and both her face and right leg were crushed. Initially doctors thought that she would not regain the ability to walk. After 17 operations and plastic surgery to reconstruct her face, she was released from the hospital able to walk with crutches. While still in recovery from the accident, three months after the collision, Mankiller began to notice a loss of muscle coordination. She dropped things, was unable to grip items, her voice tired after a few moments of speaking. Doctors thought that the problems were related to the accident, but one day while watching a muscular dystrophy telethon, Mankiller thought her symptoms sounded similar. She called the muscular dystrophy center, was referred to a specialist, and was diagnosed with myasthenia gravis. In November 1980, she returned to the hospital, underwent more surgeries and began a course of chemotherapy, which lasted several years. She went back to work in December.

She later said the car crash and its aftermath were life-changing, leading her to accept what she called "a Cherokee approach to life." In a 1993 interview on NPR, she said: "I think the Cherokee approach to life is being able to continually move forward with kind of a good mind and not focus on the negative things in your life and the negative things you see around you, but focus on the positive things and try to look at the larger picture and keep moving forward..[It] also taught me to look at the larger things in life rather than focusing on small things, and it's also awfully, awfully hard to rattle me after having faced my own mortality ... so the things I learned from those experiences actually enabled me to lead. Without those experiences, I don't think I would have been able to lead. I think I would have gotten caught up in a lot of nonsensical things."

Mankiller's first community development program as a grant writer was for Bell, Oklahoma. By requiring community members to donate their time and labor to lay 16 miles of pipe for a shared water system, build houses, or work on building rehabilitation, the grant involved the community in self-improvement. Working on the Bell project, Mankiller collaborated with Charlie Soap, who worked in the Indian Housing Authority and helped her supervise the venture. The success of the program led to its use as a model for other grant programs for her own and other tribes. In the midst of the Bell Project, in 1981, tribal chief Ross Swimmer promoted her as first director of a department she devised, the Community Development Department of the Cherokee Nation. Over the next three years, Mankiller raised millions of dollars for similar community development programs. Her approach was one of self-help, which allowed citizens to identify their problems and gain control of the challenges they faced. Impressed by her skill and results, Swimmer asked her to be his running mate for the next tribal election.

=== Politics (1983–1995) ===
==== Deputy Chief (1983–1985) ====
In 1983, Mankiller, a Democrat, was selected as a running mate by Ross Swimmer, a Republican, in a bid for Swimmer's third consecutive term as principal chief. Though they both wanted the tribe to become more self-sufficient, Swimmer felt the path was through developing tribal businesses, like hotels and agricultural enterprises. Mankiller wanted to focus on small rural communities, improving housing and health care. Their differences on policy were not a key problem in the election, but Mankiller's gender was. She was surprised by the sexism she faced, as in traditional Cherokee society, families and clans were organized matrilineally. Though traditionally women had not held titled positions in Cherokee government, they had a women's council which wielded considerable influence, and were responsible for training the tribal chief. She received death threats, her tires were slashed, and a billboard with her likeness was burned. Swimmer nevertheless remained steadfast. (Note: The 1983 election was memorable, not only because it was the first time a woman had been elected, but also because it was the first time Cherokee Freedmen had been excluded from voting. The Cherokee Constitution of 1976 specified that in Section 1 of Article III that "All members of the Cherokee Nation must be citizens as proven by reference to the Dawes Commission Rolls". While ostensibly this could have been interpreted to mean any person on the three Dawes Rolls, in 1977–1978, the voter registration committee and the tribal membership committee both introduced requirements for voters and citizens to obtain a Certificate of Degree of Indian Blood (CDIB) from the U.S. government before enrollment would be allowed. Prior to the election, the BIA area director in Muskogee, Oklahoma wrote in a memorandum that Freedmen without a CDIB could not be candidates for office, but were eligible as voters. When Freedman voters were turned away at the polls, they filed suit in 1984, naming Swimmer; the tribal registrar; a tribal council member; the tribal election committee; the United States, Office of the President; The Department of the Interior; the Office of the Secretary of State; the Bureau of Indian Affairs; and three BIA employees. At the time of the lawsuit, Mankiller stated that she believed "freedmen should not be given membership in the Cherokee tribe", as membership was reserved for those with Cherokee blood. Many tribal members at the time believed that one-quarter blood quantum should be required for tribal membership.) Swimmer won reelection against Perry Wheeler by a narrow margin, on the strength of absentee voters. Mankiller also won by absentee voters in a run-off election for the deputy chief post against Agnes Cowen and became the first woman elected deputy chief of the Cherokee Nation. Wheeler and Cowen demanded a recount and filed a suit with the Cherokee Judicial Appeals Tribunal and U. S. District Court alleging voting irregularities. Both tribal and federal courts ruled against Wheeler and Cowen.

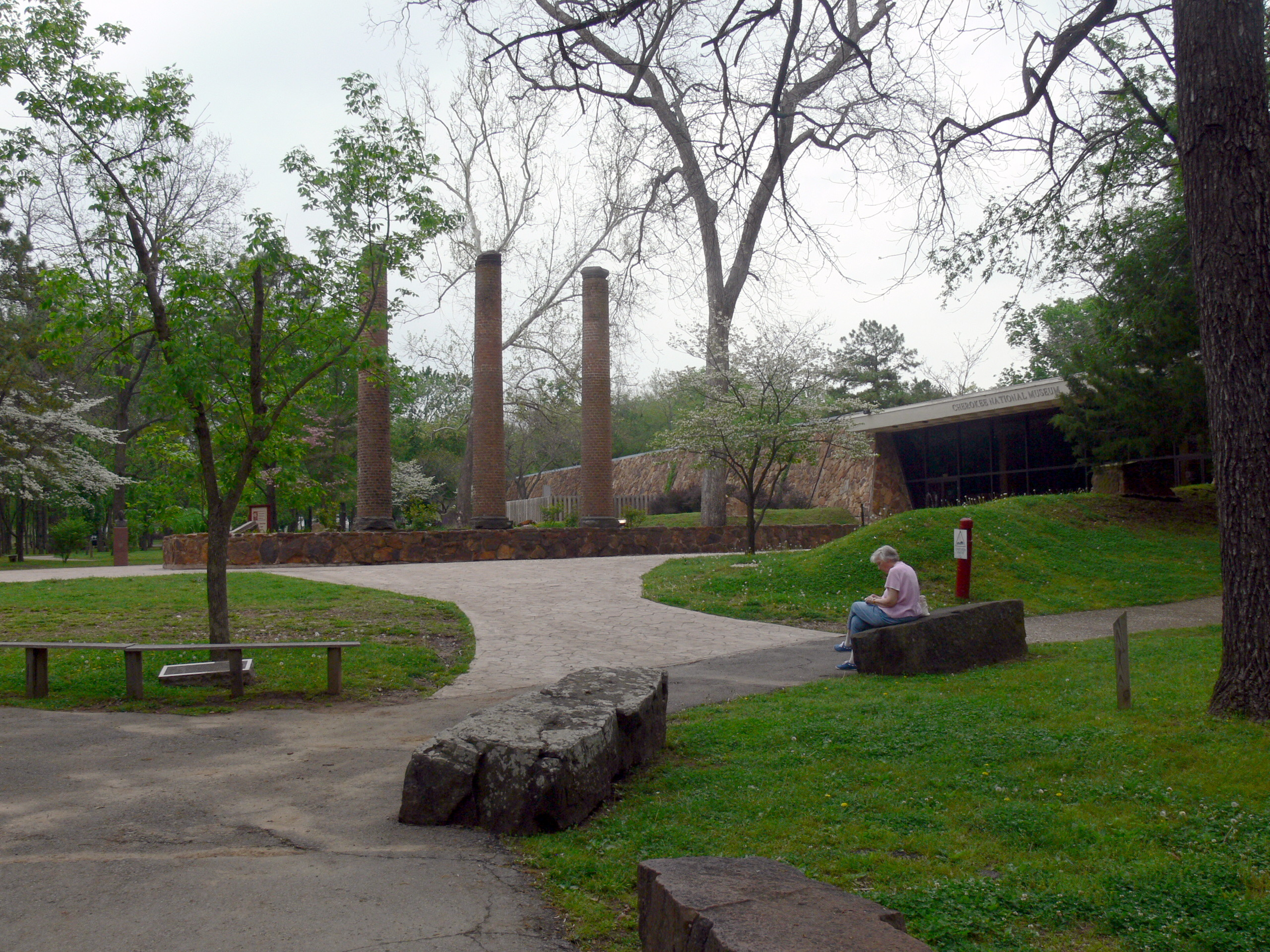
Cherokee Heritage Center

One of her main duties as deputy chief was to preside over the Tribal Council, the fifteen-member governing body for the Cherokee Nation. Though she assumed that the sexism of the campaign would end once the election was resolved, Mankiller quickly realized that she had little support in the council. Some members viewed her as a political enemy, while others discounted her because of her gender. She chose to avoid involvement in tribal legislation to minimize the hostility to her election, instead concentrating on areas of government that the council did not control. One of her first focus issues was on the full-blood/mixed-blood divide. Cherokees with non-Native ancestry had assimilated into American culture to a greater extent, while full-bloods maintained Cherokee language and culture. The two groups historically had been at odds, with much disagreement on development. By the time Mankiller was elected deputy, the mixed-blood faction focused on economic growth and favored non-Natives being hired to run Native businesses if they were more qualified. Full-bloods believed that such modernization would compromise Cherokee identity. Mankiller, who supported a middle-of-the-road approach, expanded the Cherokee Heritage Center and the Institute for Cherokee Literacy. She persuaded the tribal council to change the way that council members were elected so that rather than at-large candidates, potential members came from newly created districts. The change meant that urban areas with large populations no longer controlled the council membership.

==== Principal Chief, partial term (1985–1986) ====
In 1985, Chief Swimmer resigned when appointed assistant secretary of the US Bureau of Indian Affairs. Mankiller succeeded him as the first female principal chief of the Cherokee Nation, (Note: Mankiller is sometimes incorrectly referred to as the first woman chief of a Native American tribe. Alice Brown Davis became Principal Chief of the Seminole Tribe of Oklahoma in 1922, and Mildred Cleghorn became the Chairperson of the Fort Sill Apache Tribe in 1976. In earlier times, a number of women led their tribes, such as Nanyehi (Cherokee), Bíawacheeitchish (Gros Ventres-Crow), Vestana Cadue (Kickapoo Tribe in Kansas), Liza Moon Neck (Skull Valley Band of Goshute Indians of Utah) and Minnie Evans (Prairie Band of Potawatomi Nation), among others.) when she was sworn into office on December 5, 1985. To appease her detractors on the council, she did not attend council meetings, and stressed the separation between the executive and legislative branches of the government. Almost immediately, the press coverage on Mankiller made her an international celebrity and improved the perception of Native Americans throughout the country. In articles such as a November 1985 interview in People, Mankiller strove to show that Native cultural traditions of cooperation and respect for the environment made them role models for the rest of society. In an interview with Ms., she pointed out that Cherokee women had been valued members of their communities before mainstream society imposed patriarchy upon the tribe. In presenting her critiques of Reagan administration policies that might diminish tribal self-determination or threaten their culture, she built relationships with various power brokers. Because she lacked favor with the Tribal Council, she also used her access with the press to educate Cherokee voters on the goals of her administration and her desire to improve housing and health services. Within five months of becoming chief, Mankiller's celebrity status resulted in her election that year as American Indian Woman of the Year, an honor bestowed by the Oklahoma Federation of Indian Women, and her induction into the Oklahoma Women's Hall of Fame. She was awarded an honorary doctorate from the University of New England and received a citation for leadership from Harvard University.

By 1986, Mankiller and Charlie Soap's relationship had changed from a professional one to a personal one, leading to their engagement early in the year. Not wanting to provoke calls for her to step down, they kept the relationship private until their marriage in October. It nevertheless caused controversy, generating calls for Soap to resign from his position. He resigned, effective with the end of January 1987, which generated further criticism from Mankiller's opponents, who saw the delay as a tactic for Soap to qualify for retirement benefits. Initially, Mankiller's negative experiences dissuaded her from seeking re-election, but after her opponents tried to persuade her not to run, she entered the race with Soap's support. She persuaded voters that the tribe could cooperate with state and federal governments to negotiate favorable terms to improve their opportunities. Soap, as a full-blood Cherokee, was instrumental in taking her message to that faction and defusing the gender issue, by speaking in Cherokee with them about the traditional place of women in Cherokee society. Focusing on budget cuts by the Reagan White House, she highlighted how reductions in funding for low-income housing, health and nutrition programs, and educational initiatives were affecting the tribe. While she recognized that economic development was a priority, Mankiller stressed that business development had to be balanced by addressing social problems.

Weeks before the election, Mankiller was hospitalized for her kidney disease. Her opponents argued that she was medically unfit to lead the tribe. Turnout was high and even though Mankiller won 45% of the vote, tribal law required 50% to avoid a run-off with Perry Wheeler. She won the run-off, but within a week one of her supporters, who had been elected to the Tribal Council, died. The tribal election committee voted to nullify the absentee ballots for the new council membership, and Mankiller petitioned the Judicial Appeals Tribunal, which required a recount including the absentee voters. The council recount gave Mankiller's administration the majority and the seat was filled by a supporter of her policies. Mankiller used the press surrounding her election to combat the negative stereotypes about Native people, stressing their cultural heritage and strengths. She was selected as Newsmaker of the Year by the Association for Women in Communications and as Ms. magazine's Woman of the Year for 1987, and was featured in the article "Celebration of Heroes" in Newsweek's July 1987 edition.

==== Principal Chief, first elected term (1987–1991) ====
One of Mankiller's first initiatives was to lobby for maintaining the operation of the Talking Leaves Job Corps Center, which the U.S. Department of Labor had placed on a list for closure. Officials agreed to suspend the closure if she could find a suitable location. She recommended that the job center be housed in the financially insolvent motel, but initially the Tribal Council denied her permission. She was able to reverse their decision by promising to take the issue directly to a vote of the tribal members. She also expanded community development programs, using the Bell Project model, and in 1987 the Kenwood Project won the Department of Housing and Urban Development's Certificate of National Merit. Announcing that the Cherokee government would not wholly fund the Heritage Center, she pressed the center to become more proactive in attracting tourists and generating income to pay for its own operational expenses. When the Indian Gaming Regulatory Act of 1988 passed, Mankiller remained cautious about participating, though she acknowledged that other tribes had a right to do so. Concerned by research connecting gambling and crime, she did not endorse gaming for the Cherokee Nation. She also rejected requests for the tribe to store nuclear waste, given its potential to harm the environment. Eventually, she changed her stance and bingo parlors became a major revenue source for the tribe.

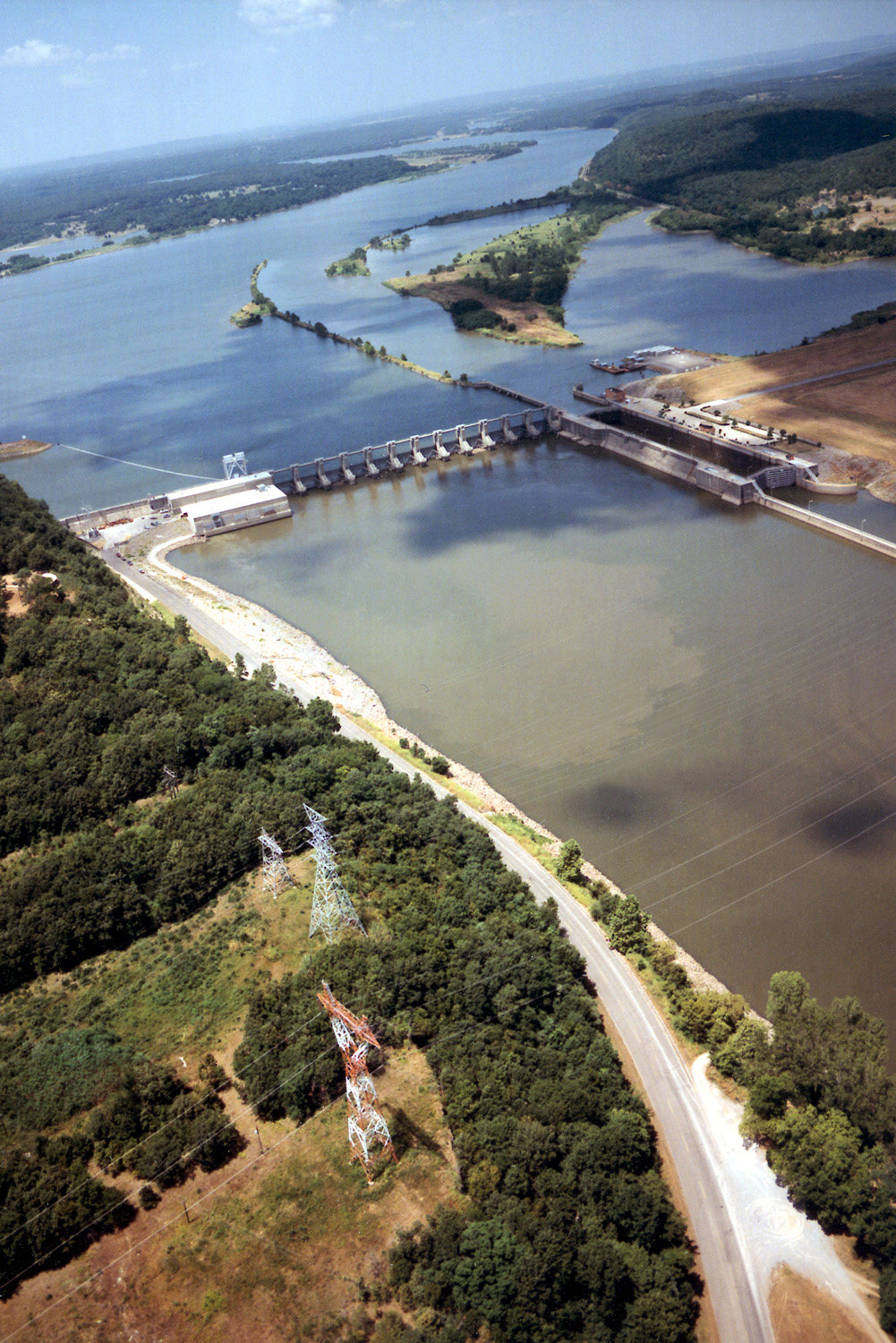
Segment of the McClellan–Kerr Arkansas River Navigation System near Webbers Falls, Oklahoma

Founding the Private Industry Council, Mankiller brought government and private businesses together to analyze ways to generate economic growth in northeastern Oklahoma. She established employment training opportunities and programs that offered financial and technical expertise to tribal members who wanted to start their own small enterprises. She also backed the creation of a tribal electronic harness and cabling company, construction of a hydroelectric plant and a horticultural operation. Another initiative launched soon after her installment was a claim of compensation from the U.S. government for misappropriating resources from the Arkansas River. The U.S. Supreme Court ruled in Choctaw Nation v. Oklahoma that the Cherokee, Choctaw and Chickasaw Nations owned the banks and riverbed of the Arkansas River. At issue was whether the tribes were entitled to be paid for the loss of access to coal, gas and oil deposits, which could no longer be extracted as the United States Army Corps of Engineers had rerouted the river during the construction of the McClellan–Kerr Arkansas River Navigation System. The Cherokee then sued the United States for compensation, and the 10th Circuit Court of Appeals ruled that the tribe was entitled to it, though the claim was reversed by the Supreme Court. The three tribes filed a claim in the United States Court of Federal Claims in 1989 alleging "mismanagement of tribal trust resources".

In December 1988, Mankiller's leadership was recognized with a national award bestowed by the Independent Sector, an umbrella group for non-profit organizations. The John W. Gardner Leadership Award recognized not only her community development projects, but also her administration of Cherokee Nation Industries, which had seen profits soar to over $2 million. In the middle of her first term, Mankiller was invited to the White House to meet with President Reagan to discuss Native peoples' grievances with his administration. Thinking that it was going to be a productive meeting, Mankiller, who had been chosen as one of the three spokespeople for the 16 invited chiefs, was disappointed that Reagan discounted their issues and merely reiterated his pledge for self-determination. Though she brushed off the meeting as a "photo opportunity" for the president, the publicity of the event further enhanced her image with the public. The most significant development in her first full term was the negotiation with the State of Oklahoma for tax sharing on businesses operating on Cherokee lands. The compact, signed by Governor David Walters and leadership of all of the Five Civilized Tribes except the Muscogee (Creek) Nation, allowed the chiefs to collect state taxes and retain a portion of the revenues.

In June 1990, Mankiller's kidney disease worsened and one of her kidneys failed. Her brother Don donated one of his kidneys, and she underwent a kidney transplant in July, returning to work within a few weeks. While she was in Boston recuperating from the transplant, she met with officials from Washington, D.C., and signed an agreement for the Cherokee Nation to participate in a project that allowed the tribe to self-govern and assume responsibility for the use of federal funds. This change in policy had come about because of allegations of corruption and mismanagement in the Bureau of Indian Affairs. Hearings on the matter resulted in amendments in 1988 to the Indian Self-Determination and Education Assistance Act of 1975, to allow ten tribes to participate in a pilot program spanning five years. Tribes received block grants and were allowed to tailor the use of funds based on local needs. Further amendments in the early 1990s extended self-determination to the Indian Health Service. Mankiller welcomed the initiative, which reinforced intergovernmental cooperation and increased self-determination. During her first full administration, her government built new health clinics, created a mobile eye-care clinic and established ambulance services. They also created early education and adult education programs. Mankiller was recognized with an honorary degree from Yale University in 1990 and from Dartmouth College in 1991.

Around the same time, the contentious relationship with the United Keetoowah Band of Cherokee Indians flared again. Under Swimmer, the Cherokee Nation had filed a lawsuit against the Keetoowah Band, which traditionally had allowed members to belong to both federally recognized tribes. Mankiller had hoped to reconcile the differences between the two tribes, but the tax compact created controversy. The Keetoowah Band refused to allow the Cherokee Nation to collect taxes from its members and began a policy of requiring their tribal members to withdraw from the Cherokee Nation, claiming to be the "true" tribe representing Cherokee people. Mankiller, whose administration had established a district court to deal with the problem of Indian country being in federal jurisdiction rather than falling under state or local law enforcement, began a practice in late 1990 of negotiating cross-deputation agreements with law enforcement agencies and the Cherokee Nation Marshal Service. (Cross-deputation became formally authorized in April 1991). Raids conducted by county officials and Cherokee Marshals on 14 smoke shops licensed by the Keetoowah Band were carried out in the fall of 1990. Officials of the band failed to obtain a restraining order against the Cherokee Nation and took their grievance to the Bureau of Indian Affairs. Unable to resolve the matter, the federal courts stepped in and ruled that the smoke shops of the Keetoowah Band were not exempt from state taxes.

==== Principal Chief, second elected term (1991–1995) ====
In March 1991, Mankiller announced her candidacy for the next election and shortly thereafter was invited to meet with other Indian leaders at the White House with President George H. W. Bush. Bush's officials, unlike Reagan's, were receptive to input from tribal leaders, and Mankiller hoped that a new era of "government-to-government relationships" would follow. In the June election, she won 83% of the vote. One of her first actions was to participate in a conference on educational programs for Native Americans, where she strongly opposed centralizing Indian education. Similarly, she opposed legislation proposed by the Oklahoma House of Representatives to collect cigarette taxes on products sold at Indian smoke shops to non-Indians. In the continuing battle over compensation for the loss of access to mineral rights owned by the tribe in the Arkansas River, Mankiller estimated that one-third of her time as chief was spent on trying to obtain a settlement.

During the school term of 1991–1992, Mankiller's administration revived the tribal Sequoyah High School in Tahlequah. Working with the American Association of University Women, she worked on a grant program to match Cherokee mentors with girls attending the boarding school. The mentors shadowed the girls through their schooling and provided guidance on career opportunities. She also focused on issues of identity throughout her second term. Mankiller worked with tribal registrar Lee Fleming and a staff member Richard Allen to document groups which claimed Cherokee heritage, and they compiled a list of 269 associations throughout the country. After the passage of the Indian Arts and Crafts Act of 1990, which provided both civil and criminal penalties for non-Native artists who promoted their work as "Indian Art", the tribe had the ability to certify artisans who could not prove their ancestry. In two highly publicized cases, involving Willard Stone and Bert Seabourn, Stone was certified, but his family asked for his certification to be removed, and Seabourn was not certified as an artist, but instead as a "goodwill ambassador".

Mankiller was vocal in her disapproval of relaxing the rigorous Bureau of Indian Affairs' processes for tribal recognition, a stance for which she was frequently criticized. In 1993, she wrote to then-governor of Georgia Zell Miller, protesting the state recognition of groups claiming Cherokee and Muscogee (Creek) ancestry. She and other tribal leaders among the Five Civilized Tribes believed that the state recognition process could allow some groups to falsely claim Native heritage. During the congressional hearings on reform of the tribal recognition policies in Washington, D.C., Mankiller stated her opposition to any reform that would weaken the recognition process. During her tenure as chief, the Cherokee tribal council passed two resolutions to bar those without a Certificate of Degree of Indian Blood (CDIB) from enrolling in the tribe. The 1988 Rules and Regulations of the Cherokee Registration Committee required applicants to possess a federal certification that they had ancestry linking them to the Dawes Rolls. The 1992 Act Relating to the Process of Enrolling as a Member of the Cherokee Nation enacted the policy into law, effectively barring Cherokee Freedmen from citizenship. Mankiller had reaffirmed "Swimmer's order on CDIBs and voting. But in 2004, Lucy Allen, a Freedman descendant, took the matter to the Cherokee Supreme Court, and the court, in a split decision, said that the descendants of Freemen were, in fact, Cherokee, could apply to be enrolled, and should have the right to vote."

In 1992, Mankiller endorsed Bill Clinton for president, but did not donate any money to his campaign. She was invited to take part in an economic conference in Little Rock, Arkansas, and participated in his transition team for the presidency. Thanks to her access to high-level officials, she became the "most influential Indian leader in the country". Her autobiography, Mankiller: A Chief and Her People, published in 1993, became a national best-seller. Gloria Steinem said in a review, "As one woman's journey, Mankiller opens the heart. As the history of a people, it informs the mind. Together, it teaches us that, as long as people like Wilma Mankiller carry the flame within them, centuries of ignorance and genocide can't extinguish the human spirit". Steinem and Mankiller became close friends, and Steinem later married her partner David Bale in a ceremony at Mankiller Flats. In May, Mankiller received an honorary Doctorate of Humane Letters from Drury College; in June, she was honored with the American Association of University Women's Achievement Award; and in October was inducted into the National Women's Hall of Fame. In 1994, she was inducted into the Oklahoma Hall of Fame, as well as the National Cowgirl Museum and Hall of Fame in Fort Worth, Texas. That same year, Mankiller was invited by Clinton to moderate the Nation-to-Nation Summit, in which leaders of all 545 federally recognized tribes in the United States were assembled to discuss a variety of topics. The summit provided a forum for tribal leaders and government officials to resolve issues concerning jurisdiction, law, resources and religious freedom. It was followed by a conference held in Albuquerque, which included the U.S. Attorney General and Secretary of the Interior. As a result of the two meetings, the Office of Indian Justice was established by the Department of Justice.

In 1995, Mankiller was diagnosed with lymphoma and chose not to run again, largely due to health problems. Because of the chemotherapy, Mankiller had to forgo the immunosuppressive drugs she had been taking since her transplant. When George Bearpaw was disqualified as a candidate, Joe Byrd succeeded her as Principal Chief. Mankiller refused to attend his inauguration, on the grounds that the disqualification of his rival was based on an expunged conviction of assault. Fearing that Byrd would fire the staff she had hired, Mankiller authorized severance packages for the workers in her final days in office. A lawsuit was filed by the new Chief on behalf of the Cherokee Nation against Mankiller, alleging embezzlement of tribal funds of $300,000 paid out to tribal officials and department heads who left at the end of her term in 1995. Cherokee Nation v. Mankiller was withdrawn by a vote of the tribal council. Reflecting on her chieftainship, Mankiller said, "We've had daunting problems in many critical areas, but I believe in the old Cherokee injunction to 'be of a good mind'. Today it's called positive thinking". When Mankiller left office, the population of the Cherokee Nation had increased from 68,000 to 170,000 citizens. The tribe was generating annual revenues of approximately $25 million from a variety of sources, including factories, retail stores, restaurants and bingo operations. She had secured federal assistance of $125 million annually to assist with education, health, housing and employment programs. Having obtained the tribe's grant for "self-governance", federal oversight of tribal funds was minimized.

=== Return to activism (1996–2010) ===
Byrd's administration became embroiled in a constitutional crisis, which he blamed on Mankiller, stating that her failure to attend his inauguration and lack of mentoring divided the tribe and left him without experienced advisors. His supporters also alleged that Mankiller was behind attempts to remove Byrd from office, an allegation she denied. She had remained silent on Byrd's administration until he accused her of heading a conspiracy. Two months after Byrd was accused of improperly using federal funds, and a month after he blamed his administration's issues on Mankiller, she went to Washington with her predecessor, Swimmer, to ask that the federal authorities allow the tribe to sort out their own problems. Despite calls from the US Secretary of the Interior, Bruce Babbitt, for congressional intervention and Oklahoma Senator Jim Inhofe's desire for presidential action, Mankiller continued to maintain that the problem was one of inexperienced leadership, in which she did not want to be involved. When an independent group of legal analysts, known as the "Massad Commission", was assembled in 1997 to evaluate the problems in Byrd's administration, Mankiller, in spite of her ongoing health concerns, was called to testify. She reiterated at the hearings that she believed the problems stemmed from poor advisors and the Chief's lack of experience.

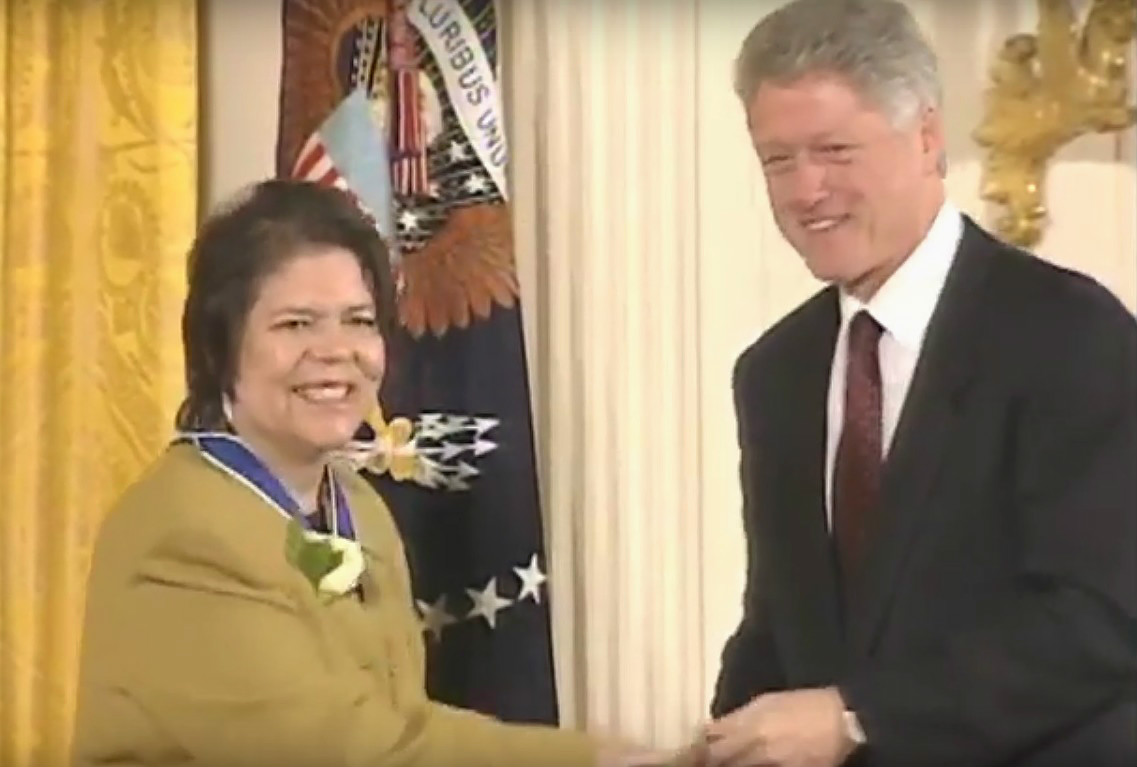
Wilma Mankiller receiving the Presidential Medal of Freedom from President Clinton, January 1998

After her term as chief, in 1996, Mankiller became a visiting professor at Dartmouth College, where she taught in the Native American Studies program as part of the school's Montgomery Fellows program. That year, she was honored with the Elizabeth Blackwell Award from Hobart and William Smith Colleges for her exemplary service to humanity. After a semester, she began traveling on a national lecture tour, speaking on health care, tribal sovereignty, women's rights and cancer awareness. She spoke to various civic organizations, tribal gatherings, universities and women's groups. In 1997, she received an honorary degree from Smith College. In 1998, President Clinton awarded Mankiller the Presidential Medal of Freedom, the highest civilian honor in the United States. Shortly after that, she had a second kidney failure and received a second transplant, from her niece, Virlee Williamson. As previously, she immediately returned to work, resuming her lecture tours and working simultaneously on four books. In 1999 Mankiller was diagnosed with breast cancer and underwent a double-lumpectomy followed by radiation treatment. That same year, The Reader's Companion to U.S. Women's History, co-edited by Mankiller, was published.

In 2002, Mankiller contributed to the book That Takes Ovaries!: Bold Females and Their Brazen Acts, and in 2004, she co-authored Every Day Is a Good Day: Reflections by Contemporary Indigenous Women. The following year, she worked with the Oklahoma Breast Cancer Summit to encourage early screening and raise awareness on the disease. From 2005 to 2006, she served as the Wayne Morse Chair of Law and Politics, established in honor of the late former Senator, at the University of Oregon.

In 2006, when Mankiller, along with other Native American leaders, was asked to send a pair of shoes to the Heard Museum for the exhibit Sole Stories: American Indian Footwear, she sent a simple pair of walking shoes. She chose the shoes because she had worn them all over the world, including trips from Brazil to China, and because they conveyed the normalcy of her life as well as her durability, steadfastness and determination. In 2007, Mankiller gave the Centennial Lecture in the Humanities for Oklahoma's 100th anniversary of statehood. After the lecture, she was honored with the inaugural Oklahoma Humanities Award by the Oklahoma Humanities Council. She continued her lecture tours and scholarship, and in September 2009 was named the first Sequoyah Institute Fellow at Northeastern State University.

== Death and legacy ==
In March 2010, Mankiller's husband announced that she was terminally ill with pancreatic cancer. Mankiller died on April 6, 2010, from cancer at her home in rural Adair County, Oklahoma.

Approximately 1,200 people attended her memorial service at the Cherokee National Cultural Grounds in Tahlequah on April 10, including many dignitaries such as sitting Cherokee Chief Chad Smith, Oklahoma Governor Brad Henry, U.S. Congressman Dan Boren and Gloria Steinem. The ceremony included statements from former president and First Lady Bill and Hillary Clinton, as well as then President Barack Obama. Mankiller was buried in the family cemetery, Echota Cemetery, in Stilwell, and a few days later was honored with a Congressional Resolution from the U.S. House of Representatives. She was posthumously presented with the Drum Award for Lifetime Achievement by the Five Civilized Tribes.

Mankiller's papers are housed in the Western History Collection at the University of Oklahoma, in Norman. With 14 honorary doctorates, she left a permanent mark on both her state and the nation, through her work to build communities and stewardship of her tribe. Over the course of her three terms as Principal Chief, Mankiller reinvigorated the Cherokee Nation through community development projects where men and women work collectively for the common good. Under the national policy of Native American self-determination, Mankiller improved federal–tribal negotiations and helped create and shepherd the government-to-government relationship that the Cherokee Nation now enjoys with the U.S. federal government. She was an inspiration to Native and non-Native Americans and a role model for women and girls. "Prior to my election", Mankiller once said, "young Cherokee girls would never have thought that they might grow up and become chief". At the 2010 annual women's conference hosted by Women Empowering Women for Indian Nations (WEWIN) to promote and empower Indigenous women's leadership, for which Mankiller had been a founding board member, a scholarship was named in her honor to pay travel expenses for women to attend the gathering.

A 2013 feature film, The Cherokee Word for Water, tells the story of the Bell waterline project that helped launch Mankiller's political career and started her friendship with her future husband, Charlie Soap. In the film, Mankiller is portrayed by actress Kimberly Norris Guerrero, and Soap is portrayed by actor Moses Brings Plenty. The film, produced by Kristina Kiehl and Soap, was a dream that involved more than 20 years of planning and fundraising. It was important to Mankiller that the story of the resilience of Native people be the focus of the film. The Mankiller Foundation, named in her honor, which focuses on educational, community and economic development projects, was involved in the production. In 2015, the Cherokee Nation completed construction on an addition to the Wilma P. Mankiller Health Center, located in Stilwell, doubling its size and updating its equipment. The center, one of the busiest of the eight hospitals in the Cherokee Nation Health Services system, serves approximately 120,000 patients annually. In 2017 a documentary film, Mankiller, produced by Valerie RedHorse Mohl, was released. Through interviews with those who knew her and archival records, the film tells the story of Mankiller's life and her time as Principal Chief of the Cherokee Nation. In 2018, Mankiller became one of the honorees in the first induction ceremony held by the National Native American Hall of Fame. In 2019, Time created 89 new covers to celebrate women of the year starting from 1920; it chose Mankiller for 1985.

In 2021, it was announced that Mankiller, Maya Angelou, Sally Ride, Adelina Otero-Warren and Anna May Wong were each selected to have their likeness appear on a quarter-dollar coin as a part of the United States Mint's "American Women quarters" Program.

In 2023, Mattel produced a Wilma Mankiller doll for their Barbie Inspiring Women series.

== Selected works ==
- Mankiller, Wilma (1985). "Keeping Pace With the Rest of the World". Southern Exposure. Durham, North Carolina: Institute for Southern Studies. ISSN 0146-809X. Reprinted in Bruchac, Joseph, ed. (1995). Aniyunwiya/real Human Beings: An Anthology of Contemporary Cherokee Prose (1st ed.). Greenfield Center, New York: Greenfield Review Press. ISBN 978-0-912-67892-4.
- Mankiller, Wilma P. (1988). The chief cooks: traditional Cherokee recipes. Muskogee, Oklahoma: Hoffman Printing Company. OCLC 25384767.
- Kauger, Yvonne; Du Bey, Richard; Mankiller, Wilma (1990). Zelio, Judy A. (ed.). Promoting Effective State-Tribal Relations: A Dialogue. Denver, Colorado: National Conference of State Legislatures. ISBN 978-1-55516-975-6.
- Mankiller, Wilma (Spring 1991). "Education and Native Americans: Entering the Twenty-First Century on Our Own Terms". National Forum. 71 (2). Baton Rouge, Louisiana: Louisiana State University: 5–7. ISSN 0162-1831.
- Mankiller, Wilma; Wallis, Michael (1993). Mankiller: A Chief and Her People (1st ed.). New York City: St. Martin's Press. ISBN 978-0-312-09868-1.
- Mankiller, Wilma P.; Mink, Gwendolyn; Navarro, Marysa; Steinem, Gloria; Smith, Barbara, eds. (1999). The Reader's Companion to U.S. Women's History. New York City: Houghton Mifflin Harcourt. ISBN 978-0-618-00182-8.
- Mankiller, Wilma (2002). "Returning Home". In Solomon, Rivka (ed.). That Takes Ovaries!: Bold Females and Their Brazen Acts. New York City: Three Rivers Press. pp. 64–66. ISBN 978-0-609-80659-3.
- Mankiller, Wilma Pearl (2004). Every Day is a Good Day: Reflections by Contemporary Indigenous Women. Introduction by Gloria Steinem; Foreword by Vine Deloria Jr. Golden, Colorado: Fulcrum Publishing. ISBN 978-1-55591-516-2.
- Mankiller, Wilma (2008). "Introduction". In Hurtado, Albert L. (ed.). Reflections on American Indian History: Honoring the Past, Building a Future. Norman, Oklahoma: University of Oklahoma Press. ISBN 978-0-8061-3896-1.

== See also ==
- Native American women in politics

== Notes ==
Political offices
Preceded by Ross Swimmer	Principal Chief of the Cherokee Nation; 1985–1995	Succeeded by Joe Byrd
