= Cherokee Casino Roland =

Cherokee-owned casino in Oklahoma, U.S.

- Interactive map of Cherokee Casino Roland
- Location: Roland, Oklahoma, U.S.; 35°24′24″N 94°31′41″W
- Gaming space: 170,000 square feet (16,000 m^{2})
- Owner: Cherokee Nation Businesses

The Cherokee Casino Roland is a casino complex located in Roland, Oklahoma. It is owned and operated by Cherokee Nation Entertainment, a division of Cherokee Nation Businesses (which is a wholly owned subsidiary of the Cherokee Nation).

== Casino ==
The casino is located in Roland, Oklahoma near the Oklahoma-Arkansas state line, I-40, and US Highway 64. It is open 24 hours a day has 170,000 square feet (16,000 m^{2}), 850 gaming machines, and 9 table games including blackjack and poker variations.

== Hotel, restaurant, and travel plaza ==
The Buffet is an onsite restaurant and offers cuisine from all four corners of the world. Cherokee Casino & Hotel Roland is located right off of I-40 and Highway 64, Exit 325. It is only 10 minutes from Ft. Smith, Arkansas. There are 120 non-smoking hotel rooms, including 12 suites.
