= Stilwell High School =

High school in Oklahoma, United States

Coordinates: 35.815551°N 94.633355°W

Location
- 1801 West Locust St; Stilwell, Oklahoma

Information
- School type: High School
- Grades: 9-12
- Enrollment: 651 (2023-2024)

Stilwell High School is a high school (grades 9–12) in Stilwell, Oklahoma, United States.

In 2020, a podcast created by Stilwell High School seniors was selected as a finalist in the National Public Radio Student Podcast Challenge. The students investigated whether the town of Stilwell really was the "early death capital" of the United States, as described by The Washington Post in 2018.

As of 2020, it had an enrollment of 634 students, over 70% of whom were Cherokee.

The 1988-1989 class was the largest graduating class with a total of 181 graduates. The class of 2009–10 had the most honor students in its graduating class with 22.

== Notable alumni ==
- Dwight W. Birdwell, Medal of Honor recipient
- Sam Claphan, All American Football Player and NFL Football Player
- Sandy Garrett, former Oklahoma Superintendent of Public Instruction
- Frankie Hargis (1965–2021), Cherokee Nation Registrar (2018–2021), Tribal Councilor (2011–2018)
- Markwayne Mullin, U.S. senator from Oklahoma
