= Joe Byrd (Cherokee Nation Principal Chief) =

American politician (born 1954)

Speaker of the Cherokee Nation Tribal Council
- In office August 2015 – August 14, 2021
- Preceded by: Tina Glory-Jordan
- Succeeded by: Mike Shambaugh

Cherokee Nation Tribal Councilor for district 2
- In office August 14, 2013 – August 14, 2021
- Preceded by: Redistricting
- Succeeded by: Candessa Tehee

Cherokee Nation Tribal Councilor for district 1
- In office January 23, 2012 – August 14, 2013
- Preceded by: Bill John Baker
- Succeeded by: Redistricting

Principal Chief of the Cherokee Nation
- In office 1995–1999
- Preceded by: Wilma Mankiller
- Succeeded by: Chad Smith

Cherokee Nation Tribal Councilor
- In office 1987–1995

Personal details
- Born: 1954 (age 71–72)
- Children: Joseph Tali Byrd

Joe Byrd (born 1954) was the Principal Chief of the Cherokee Nation from 1995 to 1999. Byrd is bilingual, with an ability to communicate in both Cherokee and English. He ran for re-election in 1999, but lost to Chad "Corntassel" Smith. He ran again in 2003, but again lost to the incumbent Smith.

== Early life and career ==
Byrd is from Nicut, Oklahoma, and Belfonte, Oklahoma. He served on the Cherokee Nation tribal council from 1987 to 1995.

== Principal Chief of the Cherokee Nation ==
In 1995, after his main rival was disqualified, Joe Byrd was elected Principal Chief of the Cherokee Nation, succeeding Wilma Mankiller. Byrd's four-year term of office was marked by controversy and conflict. By late 1997, the conflict had escalated into a constitutional crisis for the Cherokee Nation. Settling the conflict required US government intervention via the Bureau of Indian Affairs.

=== Cherokee Nation Industries (CNI) lawsuit ===
In January 1996, Byrd supported the hiring of a law firm in which his brother-in-law, Terry Barker, was one of the partners. The law firm was hired on an hourly basis to represent CNI in a dispute with a defense contractor, Stewart & Stevenson Industries, Inc. (S&S) of Houston, Texas. In May 1996, Barker's law firm filed a federal lawsuit against S&S for Breach of Contract. By October, the law firm had accrued $54,000.00 in unpaid hourly fees to CNI and $59,000 in fees to the Cherokee Nation. On October 24, 1996, the CNI leadership signed a contingency agreement with Barker's law firm which granted the law firm 37.5% of any proceeds of the S&S litigation. Later that same evening, the CNI and S&S reached a settlement, with S&S agreeing to pay CNI $1.86 million. Later court filing suggest that Terry Barker, and possibly Joe Byrd, knew about the probable settlement with S&S before CNI signed the contingency agreement. Despite the agreement limiting Barker's law firm to 37.5% of the settlement, the firm received $894,000, or more than 48% of the total settlement.

=== Tribal Council probe of Byrd's activities ===
The unusual activities and business dealings of Byrd disturbed many tribal council members. Throughout the summer of 1996, Byrd repeatedly ignored requests and directives from the Tribal Council for financial statements and documents. Also in the summer of 1996, Pat Ragsdale, Director of the Cherokee Nation Marshal service, was directed to investigate allegations of corruption against Joel Thompson, Byrd's friend, confident, and manager of Byrd's election campaign. Several other members of Byrd's administration also came under investigation. The allegations included illegal wiretap activities on Cherokee Nation premises, diversion of tribal funds, and illegal campaign funding.

Tensions between Byrd and the Tribal Council increased over Byrd's continuing refusal to comply with directives to disclose critical contracts and documents related to the Cherokee Nation funds. In August 1996, The Tribal Council petitioned the Cherokee Nation Justice Appeals Tribunal (JAT) for access to the requested materials from Byrd. The JAT ruled that all of Byrd's documents detailing any Cherokee Nation dealings were subject to review by the Tribal Council and to any Cherokee Nation citizen in accordance with the Cherokee Nation Constitution. Despite this ruling, Byrd refused to produce the requested documents.

Faced with Byrd's refusal to cooperate, Tribal Prosecutor Diane Blalock requested and received a search warrant for Byrd's headquarters. On Feb 25, 1997, the Tribal Marshals conducted a raid of Byrd's headquarters in which they seized and made copies of a number of documents. In retaliation for the seizure, Byrd fired Director Pat Ragsdale and Sharon Wright of the Cherokee Nation Marshals Service. One hour after they were fired, Cherokee Nation Justice Dwight Birdwell ordered their immediate reinstatement. Justice Birdwell also issued a standing order which stated any subsequent firings by Byrd would be considered contempt of court and obstruction of justice. Byrd then fired Ragsdale, Wright, and the entire Cherokee Nation Marshal Service. He later fired Prosecutor Blalock, who had, by then, filed obstruction of justice and misappropriation of funds charges against Byrd. As a replacement for the now "fired" marshals, Byrd requested that the Bureau of Indian Affairs (BIA) assume all law-enforcement duties for the Cherokee Nation. He also established a new security force made up of individuals who had signified their loyalty to him.

=== Wiretapping and FBI investigation ===
Byrd announced that he had requested an FBI investigation of Cherokee Nation Tribal Council Members, Marshals, and Justices on the grounds that they were plotting to "overthrow his administration". He also hired criminal defense attorneys who filed appeal briefs with the Cherokee Nation Courts. The briefs sought a stay of the warrants and stated that the Tribal Council was "plundering and pilfering" the evidence seized in the search warrants. Byrd also directed his criminal defense attorneys to file motions demanding suppression of Byrd's financial dealings, which had been seized as evidence. Byrd stated to the Justice Court that he and his associates had been conducting wiretaps of Cherokee Nation employees, government officials, and the Cherokee Nation Justice Courts. He claimed to have discovered, and turned over to the FBI, concrete evidence of the Cherokee Nation Justices' plots.

The Cherokee Nation Justice Court found Byrd in contempt and cautioned him against attempting to fire the Cherokee Nation Marshals during an ongoing investigation. Byrd responded by attempting to shut off power, water, and electricity to the Cherokee Nation Marshals Complex, but was stopped by an order of Justice Birdwell.

On Thursday, March 7, 1997, US Attorney John Raley, in conjunction with the FBI, announced an investigation into Byrd's activities and of the events which had occurred at the Cherokee Nation Tribal Complex. The FBI seized the tapes that were produced as the result of Byrd's illegal wiretaps. After reviewing the tapes and interviewing numerous Cherokee Nation members who worked at the tribal complex, the FBI investigators concluded that Byrd's allegations were without merit; they then closed the investigation he had filed. The matter of Byrd's diversion of funds was turned over to the Cherokee Nation Justice Courts for resolution. However, the United States Attorney's office, in concert with the BIA, continued their investigation into Byrd's activities.

=== Standoff with the Cherokee Nation Justices, BIA law enforcement intervention ===
On April 15, 1997, after Byrd was indicted by the Cherokee Nation Justice Courts for obstruction of justice and misuse of funds, he drafted articles of impeachment of the Cherokee Nation Court Justices. Byrd then proceeded to the Tribal Council chambers, where eight of the total fifteen council members were assembled. Despite the fact that the council was without a quorum, Byrd ordered the councilors to approve the impeachment of the Cherokee Nation Courts Justices. He also ordered the councilors to vote for ratification and relinquishment of sovereign authority to the BIA for law enforcement within the Cherokee Nation. On April 24, 1997, the BIA ordered BIA Law enforcement personnel to assume control of Law Enforcement responsibilities within the Cherokee Nation.

On May 21, 1997, Byrd shut off power and utilities to the Cherokee Nation Justice Complex, fired the Justices, and ordered his security forces to board up the Courthouse. In response, the Cherokee Nation Justices issued warrants for his arrest. The Cherokee Nation petitioned the Federal Courts for BIA officers to confiscate the weapons of Byrd's security force. The federal judge declined to rule on the grounds that the Cherokee Nation would be required to relinquish total sovereignty before federal troops could be sent into the Nation to confiscate weapons. Byrd subsequently ordered the shutdown of the Cherokee Nation Courts. His security forces, along with those of the BIA, forcibly evicted the Justices from the Courthouse, then had the Courthouse boarded up and padlocked.

During the Cherokee National Holiday (Labor Day weekend) in 1997, Oklahoma SWAT teams with high-powered rifles and BIA helicopters patrolled tribal lands. These actions were later characterized by Joe Byrd's administration in Court filings to be necessary to quell an "uprising" of the Cherokee People.

=== Restoration of order ===
In August 1997, Byrd was summoned to Washington, D.C., where he met with Attorney General Janet Reno and Secretary of the Interior Bruce Babbitt. After several days of negotiations, Byrd signed an agreement that required that he relinquish control of the Cherokee Nation law enforcement system to the Bureau of Indian Affairs. By late September, the Cherokee Nation Courts were reopened and the Cherokee Nation Marshal service was reinstated.

=== Aftermath ===
The remaining years of Byrd's term were marked with intense scrutiny by the BIA. By late 1998, there were 11 active cases against Byrd, including two criminal charges regarding diversion of Federal funds. In what some see as an attempt to influence the outcome of the obstruction of justice cases against him, in early 1998 Byrd moved the district court out of the Tribal Courthouse. In reaction, six members of the Tribal Council began boycotting scheduled Council meetings, thus leaving the Council without a quorum and therefore unable to act. After a year of stand-off, Byrd capitulated and moved the district court back to the Courthouse.

Byrd's 1996–1997 actions also had a major impact on the Cherokee Nation's 1999 Constitutional Convention. During public hearings, there were, among other items, a strong push for procedures allowing for the recall of elected officials, a call for open financial records of the Nation's government, and a desire to strengthen the power and independence of the Judiciary.

In 1999, Byrd was defeated by Chad "Corntassel" Smith in the Cherokee Nation elections. After the election, more than four years of transition were required to restore the Cherokee Nation government and remove BIA intervention from the affairs of the Cherokee Nation.

== Cherokee Tribal Council ==
Byrd was sworn onto the Cherokee Nation tribal council representing district 1 on January 23, 2012 after winning the district 1 special election to replace Bill John Baker. He was elected to a full term in the new district 2 in 2013. He was sworn in August 14, 2013. In August 2015, he was elected speaker of the tribal council. He won re-election in 2017 and was re-elected as speaker of the council. He was term limited in 2021.

Political offices
Preceded by Wilma Mankiller	Principal Chief of the Cherokee Nation; 1995–1999	Succeeded by Chad Smith
