= Gold Strike Tunica =

Casino hotel in Tunica Resorts, Mississippi

Coordinates: 34.84635°N 90.33255°W

- Interactive map of Gold Strike Tunica
- Location: Tunica Resorts, Mississippi; 1010 Casino Center Drive
- Opened: August 29, 1994; 31 years ago
- Theme: Luxury
- No. of rooms: 1,258
- Casino type: Riverboat casino
- Owner: Vici Properties
- Operating license holder: Cherokee Nation Businesses
- Previous names: Circus Circus Tunica
- Renovated in: 1997, 2009, 2010
- Website: goldstrike.com

Gold Strike Tunica (formerly Circus Circus Tunica) is a casino hotel in Tunica Resorts, Mississippi, 20 minutes south of Memphis, Tennessee. It is owned by Vici Properties and operated by Cherokee Nation Businesses.

== Casino ==
In 2008, MGM Mirage made a large investment in Gold Strike Casino Resort and a commitment to the Tunica market with a multimillion-dollar renovation and remodeling project. The upgrade, which took two years to complete and is the largest in the casino resort's history, included all of Gold Strike's 1,133 oversized rooms and 125 suites, the conference and convention center, the Atrium Café, the Courtyard Buffet and the high-limit gaming and lobby areas. The resort also includes Chicago Steakhouse restaurant, which has won several awards including the Wine Spectator Award of Excellence; a spa and salon; the 800-seat Millennium Theater; and 50,000 square feet (4,600 m^{2}) of gaming space with 52 table games and more than 1,400 slot machines.

At 31 stories tall, Gold Strike Casino Resort is one of the most recognizable buildings in Tunica and towers above all other structures. When built, the gold tower was reported to be the tallest building in Mississippi.

== History ==
=== Circus Circus (1994-97) ===
The casino was originally opened by Circus Circus Enterprises (later Mandalay Resort Group) as Circus Circus Tunica on August 29, 1994. The building, resembling a circus tent, did not house a hotel.

=== Gold Strike (1997-present) ===
Due to a 50% decline in operating income in 1997, Circus Circus began to renovate the property, adding a 1,200-room tower hotel and other features including a theater. The casino was rebranded as the Gold Strike Casino Resort and given a more upscale theme. The total cost for the remodeling was estimated to be $125 million. The Gold Strike's 31-story hotel tower was the tallest building in the state of Mississippi at the time of its opening, providing stark contrast to an area of the state previously devoted mostly to agriculture.

MGM Mirage (later MGM Resorts International) acquired Mandalay Resort Group, including the Gold Strike, in 2005. In 2009, the resort underwent another multimillion-dollar renovation during which time the property remained opened.

Ownership of the Gold Strike, along with many other MGM properties, was transferred to MGM Growth Properties in 2016, while MGM Resorts continued to operate it under a lease agreement. Vici Properties acquired MGM Growth, including the Gold Strike, in 2022.

In 2023, MGM Resorts sold the operations of the Gold Strike to Cherokee Nation Businesses, the business arm of the Cherokee Nation, for $450 million.
