= Sam Claphan =

American football player (1956–2001)

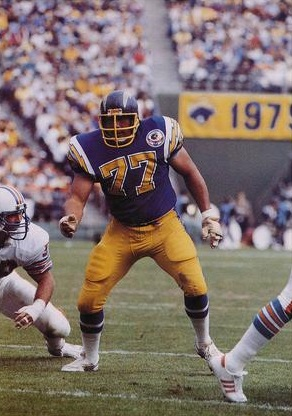
- Claphan in 1984

No. 77
- Positions: Tackle, guard

Personal information
- Born: October 10, 1956; Tahlequah, Oklahoma, U.S.
- Died: November 26, 2001 (aged 45); Siloam Springs, Arkansas, U.S.
- Listed height: 6 ft 6 in (1.98 m)
- Listed weight: 285 lb (129 kg)

Career information
- High school: Stilwell (OK)
- College: Oklahoma
- NFL draft: 1979: 2nd round, 47th overall pick

Career history
- San Diego Chargers (1980–1987)

Awards and highlights
- 2× National champion (1974, 1975); Second-team All-Big Eight (1978)

Career NFL statistics
- Games played: 87
- Games started: 46
- Fumble recoveries: 1
- Stats at Pro Football Reference

Samuel Jack Claphan (October 10, 1956 – November 26, 2001) was an American professional football player who was an offensive lineman for the San Diego Chargers of the National Football League (NFL). Claphan attended high school at Stilwell High School in Stilwell, Oklahoma, where he earned his way to All-American status in 1974. He was recruited by head coach Barry Switzer to play at the University of Oklahoma. Claphan died of a heart attack on November 26, 2001.

== Career ==
Claphan played on the 1974 and 1975 National Championship teams and was the starting lineman for the Oklahoma Sooners from 1975 to 1978. At 6' 7" and 295 lbs, Claphan was the largest player on the team. He was selected in the second round of the 1979 NFL draft (47th overall pick) by the Cleveland Browns but failed to make the roster due to a preseason injury. He was picked up by the San Diego Chargers in 1980.

Claphan played longer in the NFL than any other University of Oklahoma lineman. He was a starting offensive tackle for the San Diego Chargers, protecting the blind side of Hall of Fame quarterback Dan Fouts. He was with the Chargers from 1981 to 1987 until he retired. Claphan, a Cherokee, was inducted into the American Indian Athletic Hall of Fame in 1994.
