= Roland, Oklahoma =

- Town
- Cherokee Casino Roland

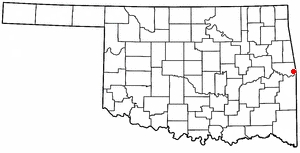
- Location of Roland, Oklahoma
- Coordinates: 35°24′53″N 94°30′49″W
- Country: United States
- State: Oklahoma
- County: Sequoyah

Area
  - Total: 3.03 sq mi (7.84 km^{2})
  - Land: 3.00 sq mi (7.76 km^{2})
  - Water: 0.027 sq mi (0.07 km^{2})
- Elevation: 466 ft (142 m)

Population (2020)
  - Total: 3,316
  - Density: 1,106.3/sq mi (427.14/km^{2})
- Time zone: UTC-6 (Central (CST))
  - Summer (DST): UTC-5 (CDT)
- ZIP code: 74954
- Area codes: 539/918
- FIPS code: 40-63800
- GNIS feature ID: 2412571
- Website: www.townofroland.net

Roland is a town in Sequoyah County, Oklahoma, United States. It is part of the Fort Smith, Arkansas-Oklahoma Metropolitan Statistical Area and the second most populated place in Sequoyah County.

The population was 3,316 at the 2020 census, slightly higher than the 3,169 recorded in the 2010 census and the 2,842 recorded in the 2000 census.

== History ==
This area was a dispersed rural community in the Cherokee Nation during the 19th century, until 1888, when the Kansas and Arkansas Valley Railway (KAVR) built a railroad line through it. (Note: The KAVR railroad line was soon leased by the St. Louis, Iron Mountain and Southern Railway (also known as (StLIM&S or Iron Mountain Railway). StLIM&S merged into the Missouri Pacific Railroad in 1927, which merged into the Union Pacific Railroad in 1982.)

Meanwhile, the formerly-dispersed residents coalesced into a small town called either Garrison or Garrison Creek. A post office was established in the town in 1902, and the town renamed itself as Roland in 1904. The 1910 census recorded 228 residents.

== Geography ==
According to the United States Census Bureau, the town has a total area of 2.7 square miles (7.0 km^{2}), of which 2.6 square miles (6.7 km^{2}) is land and 0.04 square miles (0.10 km^{2}) (0.75%)is water. Roland is 4 miles (6.4 km) east of Muldrow and 6 miles (9.7 km) west of Fort Smith.

== Demographics ==
Historical population
Census	Pop.	Note	%±
1910	228		—
1920	271		18.9%
1930	212		−21.8%
1940	311		46.7%
1950	443		42.4%
1960	100		−77.4%
1970	827		727.0%
1980	1,472		78.0%
1990	2,481		68.5%
2000	2,842		14.6%
2010	3,169		11.5%
2020	3,316		4.6%
U.S. Decennial Census

=== 2020 census ===
As of the 2020 census, Roland had a population of 3,316. The median age was 34.4 years. 27.2% of residents were under the age of 18 and 14.1% of residents were 65 years of age or older. For every 100 females there were 95.4 males, and for every 100 females age 18 and over there were 88.2 males age 18 and over.

0.0% of residents lived in urban areas, while 100.0% lived in rural areas.

There were 1,292 households in Roland, of which 36.8% had children under the age of 18 living in them. Of all households, 40.8% were married-couple households, 20.0% were households with a male householder and no spouse or partner present, and 32.5% were households with a female householder and no spouse or partner present. About 28.4% of all households were made up of individuals and 12.8% had someone living alone who was 65 years of age or older.

There were 1,402 housing units, of which 7.8% were vacant. The homeowner vacancy rate was 1.3% and the rental vacancy rate was 6.8%.

Racial composition as of the 2020 census
Race	Number	Percent
White	1,978	59.7%
Black or African American	152	4.6%
American Indian and Alaska Native	544	16.4%
Asian	24	0.7%
Native Hawaiian and Other Pacific Islander	1	0.0%
Some other race	74	2.2%
Two or more races	543	16.4%
Hispanic or Latino (of any race)	156	4.7%

=== 2000 census ===
As of the census of 2000, there were 2,842 people, 1,055 households, and 815 families in the town. The population density was 1,075.6 inhabitants per square mile (415.3/km^{2}).

There were 1,055 households, out of which 41.0% had children under the age of 18 living with them, 56.8% were married couples living together, 17.2% had a female householder with no husband present, and 22.7% were non-families. 19.5% of all households were made up of individuals, and 8.9% had someone living alone who was 65 years of age or older. The average household size was 2.69 and the average family size was 3.09.

In the town, the population was spread out, with 31.5% under the age of 18, 9.5% from 18 to 24, 29.0% from 25 to 44, 19.6% from 45 to 64, and 10.4% who were 65 years of age or older. The median age was 31 years. For every 100 females, there were 90.1 males. For every 100 females age 18 and over, there were 85.2 males.

The median income for a household in the town was $29,015, and the median income for a family was $32,863. Males had a median income of $26,294 versus $19,779 for females. The per capita income for the town was $13,410. About 16.9% of families and 20.9% of the population were below the poverty line, including 26.9% of those under age 18 and 13.3% of those age 65 or over.

== Notable person ==
Joshua Wheeler (1975-2015); American soldier killed in Iraq in 2015, born in Roland.

== See also ==
- Cherokee Casino Roland
