= Darryl Tonemah =

Darryl Tonemah is an American Indian health psychologist and musician, of Kiowa, Comanche and Tuscarora heritage. He was born on the Tuscarosa Reservation in New York, the son of Indian Health Service worker and a nurse.

Tonemah has three bachelor's degrees, in Psychology, Sociology and Gerontology; a master's degree in Community Counseling; and a Ph.D. in Counseling Psychology and Cultural Studies. He is currently the director of the Health Promotion Program at the University of Oklahoma College of Continuing Education, and works with Native groups across the United States and Canada promoting health and wellness. He provided behavioral support for National Institutes of Health research on diabetes prevention and lifestyle change among Indian populations, and was named to the American Diabetes Association's board of directors in January 2011.

In addition to his health services work, Tonemah is a recording artist, having produced five critically acclaimed CDs since 1992. He describes his musical style as "Native Americana."

== Discography ==
- Ink Blots and Random Thoughts (2009)
- Welcome to Your Rainy Day (2006)
- One in Every Crowd (2004)
- A Time Like Now (2002)
- Journals of my Misperceptions (2000)
- The Ghosts of St. Augustine (1997)
- Can You Hear Me? (1992)

== Awards ==
- 2008: Native American Music Award for Best Folk Recording (Welcome to Your Rainy Day)
- 2008: Silver Arrow Award for Contributions to Native American Music
