= Hastings Shade =

Cherokee chief (1941–2010)

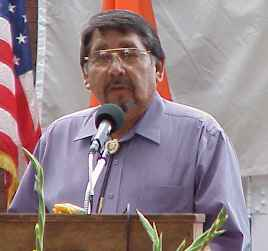
- Shade speaking at Cherokee National Holiday, Tahlequah, Oklahoma, 2001

Deputy Chief of the Cherokee Nation
- In office 1999–2003
- Preceded by: Garland Eagle
- Succeeded by: Joe Grayson

Personal details
- Born: May 20, 1941 Tahlequah, Oklahoma, U.S.
- Died: February 9, 2010 (aged 68) Tulsa, Oklahoma, U.S.
- Resting place: Keener Cemetery, Lost City, Oklahoma
- Spouse: Loretta Shade
- Relations: Sequoyah
- Children: Larry, Thomas, and Ronald
- Parent(s): Tom and Leanna (Stopp) Shade

Hastings Shade (May 20, 1941 – February 9, 2010) was a former deputy chief of the Cherokee Nation. He was a traditionalist, artist, and master level fluent speaker of the Cherokee language.

== Background ==
Hastings Shade was born on May 20, 1941, in Tahlequah, Oklahoma. His parents were Tom and Leanna Stopp Shade.

== Traditional artist ==
Hastings Shade was declared a Cherokee National Treasure in 1991 for his extensive traditional knowledge, particularly his ability to make Cherokee marbles by hand. He was the only known maker of Cherokee marbles (gadayosdi). He painstakingly fashioned the balls from limestone and they are about the size of a billiard ball.

He also made fishing and frog gigs that are sought after by collectors.

== Deputy Chief ==
Shade served one term as deputy chief of the Cherokee Nation, from 1999 to 2003, with Chad Smith. In an unusual political move, Shade ran independently for deputy chief in 2003 but did not win the election. During his time in office, he helped develop the Cherokee Nation's language programs, specially the Cherokee language immersion programs for school children.

== Personal ==
Shade was considered a fullblood Cherokee. However, since he was a sixth-generation descendant of Sequoyah, the inventor of the Cherokee syllabary, he no doubt had a degree of European ancestry, as Sequoyah himself was not a full blood Cherokee. Hastings was married to Loretta Shade, also a master level fluent speaker of the Cherokee language. Together they lived in Lost City, outside of Hulbert, Oklahoma. Shade died on February 9, 2010, in Tulsa, Oklahoma. "He foremost was a gentleman and a traditionalist who was fluent in Cherokee language and conversant in Cherokee thought. He was a teacher," said Chad Smith.

== Dideyohvsdi ==
Cherokee Earth Dwellers by Christopher B Teuton and Hastings Shades describes teachings and the process of learning from within a Cherokee cultural context, where teaching and learning are entwined. Speaking of Hastings, "He would say 'This is a teaching.'. He would never say 'I'm a teacher," according to Hastings' son Larry Shade. Hastings' grandfather Charley Smith modeled this by encouraging Hastings to be aware of his surroundings, be attentive as Charley pointed out the creatures and spoke their names, shared their stories, and asked Hastings to listen to their sounds. "Grandpa would say: 'Nitsadulihv'i tsadetlosgwasdi. Tla yidetlosgwasdi." That is "If you want to learn, you'll learn. If you don't want to learn, you won't learn," as recounted by Hastings widow, Loretta Shade.

== Published works ==
- Shade, Hastings. Myths, Legends, and Old Sayings. Self-published, 1994. ASIN B0006RH39I
- Cowan, Agnes; Loretta Shade; Hastings Shade; Agnes Louise Clark; and Jane B. Noble. Cherokee–English Language Reference Book. Welling: Cross-Cultural Education Center Inc., 1995. ASIN B00182V8YQ.
- Christopher B. Teuton; Hastings Shade Cherokee Earth Dwellers: Stories and Teachings of the Natural World. 2023. ISBN 9780774869621
