= Inter-Tribal Environmental Council =

Native American organization

The Inter-Tribal Environmental Council (ITEC) was set up in 1992 to protect the health of Native Americans, their natural resources, and environment. To accomplish this ITEC provides technical support, training and environmental services in a variety of disciplines. Currently, there are over forty ITEC member tribes in Oklahoma, New Mexico, and Texas. The ITEC is an example of the Native American Pan-Indian Organizations and Efforts.

The ITEC office has a full-time staff of twenty-two who organize and provide services to the individual ITEC member tribes. In addition, they assist individual tribes with other environmentally related issues and concerns as they arise.

The Cherokee Nation, as the leading agency in the ITEC, has been at the forefront of protecting natural resources, health, and the environment for the tribal community. Through their five stationary air-monitoring stations and one mobile air-monitoring station, the largest tribally owned and operated system of its kind in the United States, they provide quality environmental data to rural and tribal communities.

ITEC has received funding from the U.S. Environmental Protection Agency.

== Example of Native Americans' concern for the Environment ==
Marine Mammal Protection Act: Reauthorization Issues for the 107th Congress

Native American culture and tradition has always revered animals as a part of nature that must be preserved. Historically, Native Americans have relied on animals for subsistence needs; so naturally many tribes and indigenous groups are concerned about the management of marine mammals. The long-term goals of tribes and indigenous groups under the Marine Mammal Protection Act are economic stability, resource sustainability, and regulatory certainty. Native Americans also believe that managing our environment and our interactions with animals "fosters economic vitality, environmental health, and rational management of natural resources."

== ITEC Programs ==
=== Clean Air Program ===
The CNEP Clean Air Program operates one of the largest tribal air monitoring networks in the country. It operates five air monitoring sites within tribal jurisdictional boundaries in Oklahoma. The criteria pollutants being monitored include carbon monoxide, ozone, sulfur dioxides, nitrogen oxides and particulate matter.

- The 1990 Clean Air Act Amendments
  - Title I Attainment and Maintenance of Air Quality Standards
  - Title II Mobile Sources
  - Title III Hazardous Air Pollutants
  - Title IV Acid Deposition Control
  - Title V Operating Permits
  - Title VI Stratospheric Ozone Protection
  - Title VII Enforcement

=== General Assistance Program (GAP) ===
The United States Congress authorized the Environmental Protection Agency to develop a technological assistance program for Native Americans through the Indian Environmental General Assistance Program Act of 1992.

Four main components:

- Infrastructure Development
- Skills and Training Development
- Needs Assessment
- Environmental Program Development

The principal objective of the GAP program is to provide opportunities for its member tribes to assess, evaluate and develop plans to address environmental and public health issues. Tribes that desire multi-media programs that address environmental issues can receive technical assistance through the GAP program.

The Environmental Protection Agency provides $1 million per year to tribes through their General Assistance Program (GAP). This money helps the tribes build environmental protection capacity and clean up dump sites. Member tribes close between 50 and 100 dumps every year, put infrastructure in place to prevent dumping, develop plans, and pass codes and ordinances.

=== ITEC Brownfields Response Program (IBRP) ===
The IBRP is designed to assist Native American tribes with identifying tribal property that may or may not have contamination, and then assisting with the clean up process.

"[A] brownfields site is an abandoned, idle, or underused industrial/commercial facility where expansion or redevelopment is complicated by real or perceived environmental contamination." One such example is the Markoma Bible Academy of Tahlequah, Oklahoma, which was contaminated with asbestos and lead-based paint. The Cherokee Nation cleaned, remediated, and refurbished the site to create a Program of All-Inclusive Care for the Elderly (PACE) care center.

IBRP staff will be available to perform a Phase 1 Environmental Site Assessment on the potentially contaminated property. If the property is indeed contaminated, a Phase II Assessment may also be performed at the request of the tribe. After the assessment stage(s) are completed and the specific contaminate(s) are identified, "tribal staff can make decisions regarding clean-up of the site. IBRP staff will be available to assist in this process."

After clean-up, the site will be ready for redevelopment. Because each property is unique, the tribal staff will know what the best reuse of the property should be. IBRP staff will be available to assist in this process. IBRP staff has experience in performing site assessments and site characterizations on contaminated properties and we are looking forward to working with the ITEC tribes in this growing program.

=== Solid Waste Program ===
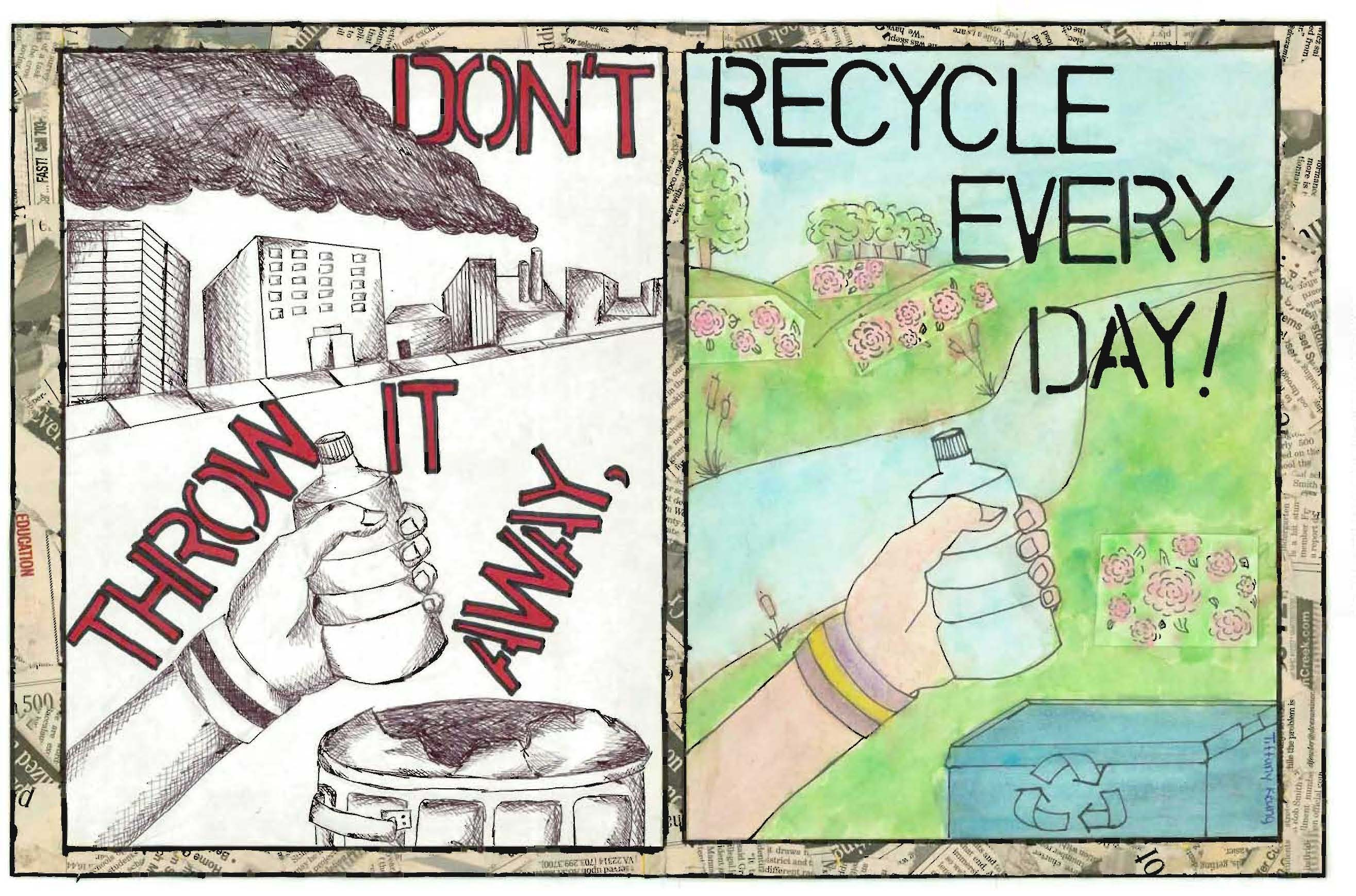
Solid Waste does not decompose, so recycle to save the environment

The ITEC Subtitle D program provides these benefits to members of the ITEC:

- Development of a Tribal illegal dump database and corresponding maps using
- Global Positioning Systems and Geographical Information Systems instruments and software
- An ITEC-sponsored workshop addressing Tribal solid waste enforcement issues a feasibility study on Tribal disposal methods
- Technical assistance including illegal dump assessments for use in grant proposals (i.e. Open Dump Cleanup Grant Proposals)
- Distribution of a model Tribal integrated solid waste management plan and model solid waste codes and ordinances
- Information on environmental initiatives such as Earth Day and America Recycles Day to ITEC member Tribes.
- Coordination with state and federal entities to promote proper solid waste management practices

=== Superfund Program ===
The Comprehensive Environmental Response, Compensation, and Liability Act (CERCLA), more commonly known as Superfund, was enacted by Congress on December 11, 1980. Superfund is a federally funded program that provides for the evaluation and cleanup of abandoned hazardous waste sites. CERCLA also established compensation for stakeholders, such as Indian Tribes, who own land on which there are hazardous waste sites, negatively affecting economy and valuable resources.

The Superfund Program can provide non-emergency evaluation of a site on behalf of an ITEC member tribe only if these three criteria are met:

1. Hazardous waste (as defined in CERCLA) is known or suspected to be present on site.
2. The site, such as an industrial facility, is abandoned or inactive.
3. Wastes on the site are impacting, or have the potential to impact, tribal lands or tribal populations.

=== Underground Storage Tank Program (UST) ===
Underground Storage Tank for storing hazardous waste

Environmental/Governmental regulations regarding underground storage tanks have been issued by the U.S. Environmental Protection Agency. "The regulations cover the design, construction and installation of new UST systems, and require that existing systems meet certain EPA standards. The regulations require that owner/operators of UST systems demonstrate financial responsibility for the cleanup of spills or releases, and/or to compensate third parties for any resulting damages." Today there are over 560 separate federally‐recognized tribal governments throughout the United States. Of these tribes, approximately 200 have active or closed federally‐regulated underground storage tanks (USTs or tanks) on their lands. There are currently about 2,600 active USTs in Indian country.

UST training is provided to tribal environmental professionals, UST owners and operators by ITEC through EPA grants. The ITEC has one of the longest running working relationships with EPA on UST issues and offered the first UST owner/operator training through an EPA grant in 2000. To date, over 260 individuals have participated in the training and ITEC continues to provide about six Indian country owner/operator trainings a year. The EPA recommends that states inspect underground storage tanks every three years, however, Tribes are not under the same guidelines as states. Most USTs have been upgraded, but many are not properly maintained and operated.
