= Cherokee Nation Businesses =

American conglomerate holding company headquartered in Catoosa, Oklahoma

Cherokee Nation Businesses, LLC
- Type: Tribal-Owned Enterprise
- Industry: Conglomerate
- Founded: Tahlequah, Oklahoma, US (2004)
- Founder: Cherokee Nation
- Headquarters: Catoosa, Oklahoma
- Area served: Worldwide (Primarily United States)
- Key people: Bill John Baker (Executive Chairman); Chuck Garrett (CEO)
- Revenue: ▲US$ 1.02 billion (2017)
- Net income: ▲US$ 114.3 million (2017)
- Number of employees: 7,500
- Website: CherokeeNationBusinesses.com

Cherokee Nation Businesses, LLC (CNB) is an Cherokee-American conglomerate holding company headquartered in Catoosa, Oklahoma that oversees and manages several subsidiary companies. CNB is a wholly owned subsidiary of the Cherokee Nation, the largest Native American tribe by population in the United States. CNB operates in the following industries: aerospace and defense, hospitality and entertainment, environmental and construction services, information technology, healthcare, and security and safety.

== History ==
Cherokee Nation Businesses was established on June 16, 2004. CNB is a wholly owned subsidiary of the Cherokee Nation. The tribe exerts control over the operations of CNB through the Board of Directors. Upon its establishment, CNB became responsible for providing "strategic direction" to all Cherokee Nation of Oklahoma-owned businesses, to diversify the Cherokee Nation business holdings, and to act as a holding company for some Cherokee Nation of Oklahoma business investments. CNB receives revenues from its subsidiaries in order to fund the expansion of existing firms and the acquisition of new ones. CNB was established to diversify the business interests of the Cherokee Nation of Oklahoma. At its establishment, pursuant to the Cherokee Nation of Oklahoma Corporation Reform Act of 2002, 25% of all CNB profits were to be reinvested with the Tribal Government as dividend payment.

Pursuant to the provisions of the Cherokee Nation Jobs Growth Act of 2005, CNB became the holding company for all business enterprises, including Cherokee Nation Entertainment (CNE) and Cherokee Nation Industries (CNI). CNE was transferred to CNB ownership in 2006 and CNI was transferred in 2008. Prior to these transfers ownership of CNE and CNI were held directly by the Cherokee Nation of Oklahoma. At its establishment, CNB was governed by its own board with both CNE and CNI governed by separate boards of their own. In 2010, the separate boards were dissolved and consolidated into a single CNB board. The same year, the Cherokee Nation of Oklahoma enacted the Dividend Act of 2005, which increased CNB's annual dividend payment to the Tribal Government from 25% to 30% of a total profits.

CNB established its Environmental and Construction Division in March 2005 with the establishment of Cherokee CRC. The Division provides environmental consulting, construction engineering and management services, environmental remediation services, and scientific research and development (including laboratory testing) for government agencies as well as for chemical, oil and gas, manufacturing and waste companies. The Division was expanded in 2008 with the establishment of Cherokee Nation Construction Services' to offer construction management services. In February 2010, CNB announced the closure of CNB Manufacturing Division's construction unit due to constant financial problems. The unit's assets were moved from CNB's Manufacturing Division into its Environmental Division. The CNB Manufacturing Division's defense contracting mission was expanded in August 2008 with the acquisition of Alabama-based Aerospace S.E., Inc., which provides aerospace product distribution and supply chain services for the United States Department of Defense.

In August 2010, in order to implement the provisions of the Jobs Growth Act of 2005, CNB consolidated its various internal support and administrative service operations into a single structure located in Tulsa, Oklahoma. The new office complex houses several of CNB's operating divisions as well as CNB-wide corporate support staff offices. CNB's Manufacturing Division remained headquartered in Stilwell, Oklahoma, with CNB's gaming operations and corporate headquarters remaining centered in Catoosa, Oklahoma.

CNB established its Security and Defense Division in July 2010. The Division provides security services, including property surveillance and guard services. Additionally, through the acquisition of Kellyville, Oklahoma-based Cherokee Nation Red Wing, the Division serves as a defense contractor by manufacturing and assembling electronic parts for the United States Department of Defense and the aerospace industry. In July 2012, the Manufacturing and Distribution Division's telecommunications group expanded with the acquisition of a 143,000-square foot building at the MidAmerica Industrial Park in Pryor, Oklahoma, establishing the CNB Distribution Center in the process.

CNB completed the acquisition of Mobility Plus, a Muskogee, Oklahoma-based supplier of health care equipment, in November 2011, expanding CNB's Healthcare Division in the process. That same month, CNB purchased expanded its Technology Division through the purchase of two Colorado-based companies: ETI Professionals Inc. (which was renamed Cherokee Nation Government Solutions) which offers strategic technology project management and staffing solutions, and ITX Inc. (which was consolidated into Cherokee Services Group) which provides full-service computer and information technology services to United States federal government and commercial entities.

In November 2011, at the request of Principal Chief of the Cherokee Nation of Oklahoma Bill John Baker, the Cherokee Nation of Oklahoma enacted the Corporate Health Dividend Act of 2011, which increased CNB's annual dividend payment to the Tribal Government from 30% to 35% of a total profits. The 5% is earmarked to support the provision of healthcare services to Cherokee citizens. In March 2012, CNB sold its corporate airplane at the request of Chief Baker. Baker had promised the sale of the plane as part of his 2011 election campaign. The proceeds of the sale (approximately $1.5 million) was given to the Cherokee Nation of Oklahoma to supplement its funding of healthcare services for Cherokee Nation of Oklahoma members.

CNB purchased a 298,000 square foot building in Tahlequah, Oklahoma, in November 2012 in order to allow for future expansion of its manufacturing operations.

== Corporate affairs ==
The Cherokee Nation Principal Chief, with the approval of the Cherokee Nation Tribal Council, appoints all members of the Board of Directors of CNB. The current Chairman of the Board is Sam Hart, having served in that position since February 14, 2012.

The current chief executive officer of CNB, Chuck Garrett, has been CEO since August 2019, replacing Shawn Slaton, who had served as CEO since 2011. Garrett is a graduate of the University of Oklahoma and Harvard Law School. A native of Muskogee, with family ties in Adair County, and a Cherokee Nation citizen, Garrett worked in real estate investment, asset management and investment banking prior to returning to Oklahoma to join CNB in 2013.

For the fiscal year ending September 30, 2011, Cherokee Nation Businesses reported a net income of $91.5 million on $653.5 million of revenue (a 14% profit margin).

== Operating divisions ==
=== Hospitality ===
Chief Operating Officer: Mark Fulton

CNB's Hospitality Division oversees the company's portfolio of retail, hotel, gaming, and entertainment assets. The Division operates through its primary subsidiary: Cherokee Nation Entertainment (CNE). CNE was formed in the late 1980s and is the holding company for all gambling, gaming, entertainment, and hospitality operations of the Tribe. CNE operates ten casinos, three hotels, a horse racing facility with electronic gaming machines, retail and convenience shops, entertainment venues, golf courses, and cultural tourism programs. CNE operates casinos in the following Oklahoma locations:

- Tulsa (Hard Rock Hotel and Casino Tulsa)
- Fort Gibson
- Roland (Hotel and Casino) (Cherokee Casino Roland)
- Ramona
- South Coffeyville
- Sallisaw
- Tahlequah
- West Siloam Springs (Hotel and Casino)
- Claremore (Will Rogers Downs)
- Grove

CNE also operates Gold Strike Tunica in Mississippi

CNE is itself the holding company of Will Rogers Downs LLC and Cherokee Hotels. WRD owns and operates a horse racing and casino facilities in Claremore while Cherokee Hotels is responsible for owning and operating hotels managed by CNE in Tulsa, Roland, and West Siloam Springs.

In Oklahoma, CNE is regulated by the Indian Gaming Regulatory Act (IGRA). IGRA mandates that all Class III gaming operations can only be conducted on Tribal land held in trust for the tribe by the Bureau of Indian Affairs.

The Mississippi Gaming Commission regulates Gold Strike Tunica.

=== Manufacturing and Distribution ===
Division President: Chris Moody

CNB's Manufacturing and Distribution Division provides products and services to the commercial and defense aerospace industry, leading telecommunications companies, and government and commercial clients in need of facility and office solutions. The Division's predecessor was initially formed in 1969 as the first business entity owned by the Cherokee Nation of Oklahoma. The Division is a defense contractor for the United States Department of Defense.

The division is the holding company for several subsidiaries under the umbrella Cherokee Nation Industries (CNI) brand:

- Cherokee Nation Aerospace and Defense (CNAD) provides contract manufacturing, electromechanical assembly, and component integration for commercial and military aerospace needs
- Cherokee Nation CND provides contract manufacturer and integrator of electro-mechanical assemblies commercial and military aerospace needs
- Cherokee Nation Metalworks (CNMW) manufactured fabricated details and assemblies for commercial and military aircraft as well as various military missile and unmanned aerial vehicles
- Cherokee Nation Office Solutions (CNOS) provides office and facility support products and services
- Cherokee Nation Telecommunications (CNT) sells and distributes communication products for government agencies and businesses
- Aerospace Products, S.E. (APSE) 75% stake acquired by CNB in 2008, defense contractor providing third party logistics and outsource procurement services to aerospace and defense firms and the United States Department of Defense

=== Federal Solutions ===
Cherokee Nation Businesses' Federal Solutions companies provide information technology, management, consulting, medical, professional, environmental, and construction services. The companies also offer management and support of programs, projects, professionals and technical staff.

- Cherokee Medical Services (CMS) provides a wide range of services including recruiting, credentialing and placement of clinical, technical, administrative, professional, engineering and housekeeping personnel for federal agencies and commercial clients.
- Cherokee Nation 3S (CN3S) provides a wide range of services including recruiting, credentialing and placement of clinical, technical, administrative, professional, engineering and housekeeping personnel for federal agencies and commercial clients.
- Cherokee Nation Assurance (CNA) delivers professional management and consulting services to defense, health, environmental and civilian agencies. The company provides management for government programs and disciplines including health information technology, research & science, program management, communications, correspondence and document management, governance and administrative support.
- Cherokee Nation Cherokee CRC (CCRC) is an environmental, construction and professional services company that provides the federal government with custom tailored services.
- Cherokee Nation Construction Resources (CNCR) is a construction management company specializing in preconstruction services such as design and planning, scheduling, budgeting, defining project roles and responsibilities, as well as constructability reviews. CNCR's team of construction managers also work to ensure the use of TERO subcontractors on CNB projects.
- Cherokee Nation Construction Services (CNCS) provides professional, technical and administrative support teams for government and commercial clients. CNCS helps manage construction projects through engineering, scheduling, safety and financial management controls.
- Cherokee Nation Diagnostic Innovations (CNDI) provides business consulting services.
- Cherokee Nation Environmental Solutions (CNES) is based in Tulsa, Oklahoma. CNES provides soil testing, storm drainage/run off, site assessment, above & underground storage tanks, regulatory contracting, long-term monitoring, environmental consulting, hazardous waste collection, treatment and disposal, as well as other miscellaneous waste management services.
- Cherokee Nation Government Solutions (CNGS) provides technical services and project personnel to support and supplement the mission, expertise and skill sets of federal, state and local government. CNGS locates specific candidates for rapid response requests in areas including science, engineering, construction, information technology, research & development, facilities management, program management and mission support.
- Cherokee Nation Healthcare Services (CNHS) provides analysis and optimization services for federal health programs, improving access to care, medical readiness and program efficiency within federal projects.
- Cherokee Nation Integrated Health (CNIH) delivers professional management consulting services and manages intricate government programs and disciplines including health information technology, program management and administrative support.
- Cherokee Nation Management & Consulting (CNMC) provides advisory & assistance services in research, experimental development, technology implementation, and program management.
- Cherokee Nation Mechanical (CNM) provides mechanical and plumbing solutions including cost management, constructability analysis, fabrication and systems installation, pre-construction services and 3-D modeling.
- Cherokee Nation Mission Solutions (CNMS) is a global service provider partnering with U.S. federal government to provide diplomatic support services such as housing, transportation, shipping and facilities maintenance to assist the U.S. Department of Homeland Security, Department of Defense and other federal agency and personnel, as well as their families, with transitioning overseas. As an established Outside the Continental United States or OCUNUS, provider, CNB's international teams are continually adding new capabilities and experience in foreign markets.
- Cherokee Nation Operational Solutions (CNOS) provides medical equipment and supplies along with office products and services to businesses and health care facilities throughout North America.
- Cherokee Nation Strategic Programs (CNSP) provides technical services, including information technology, global vulnerability assessments, information assurance, intelligence operations, program management and professional services, throughout the U.S. and overseas.
- Cherokee Nation Security and Defense (CNSD) specializes in anti-terrorism and force protection and provides services in securing facility perimeters.
- Cherokee Nation System Solutions (CNSS) provides services, consultation and products, including application modernization, data utilization and advanced analytics, geospatial, GIS and remote sensing, information technology infrastructure, program professional services and scientific and research capabilities, to government agencies.
- Cherokee Nation Technologies (CNT) provides unmanned systems, IT services, technology and geospatial information systems services, as well as management and support of programs, projects, professionals and technical staff.
- Cherokee Nation Technology Solutions (CNTS) provides technical support services and project support personnel to its defense and civilian agency clients.
- Cherokee Services Group (CSG) provides federal and commercial clients throughout the U.S. with IT and business support services. CSG specializes in software and application services, network infrastructure services, and business process services. Headquartered in Tulsa, Oklahoma, Cherokee Services Group has a regional office in Fort Collins, CO, and 22 additional offices nationwide.

=== Real Estate ===
Senior Real Estate Development Manager: Brian Hunt

Cherokee Nation Businesses' Real Estate Division operates primarily through Cherokee Nation Property Management (CNPM). CNPM offers several real estate options, including management, development, acquisitions and leasing. The division generates revenue and develops long-term strategies for commercial development while managing more than 3 million square feet of property.

=== Security and Defense ===
Division President: Russell Claybrook

CNB's Security and Defense Division provides security and protection products and services to commercial and governmental clients. The division is also a defense contractor for the United States Department of Defense that provides on aviation weapon systems life-cycle support, with locations across the United States in key military bases.

- Cherokee Nation Defense Solution (CNDS) provides critical site infrastructure protection and security surveillance services, and access control products
- Cherokee Nation Red Wing (CNRW) acquired by CNB in 2009, a defense contractor providing aviation and weapon system engineering and manufacturing
- Cherokee Nation Security and Defense (CNSD) provides internal security for all CNB properties and external security and surveillance services to private contracts and government agencies

=== Environmental and Construction ===
Division President: Cheryl Cohenour

The Environmental and Construction Division provides clients with environmental, construction and professional services. The Division oversees project management through effective engineering, scheduling, safety and financial management controls.

- Cherokee CRC - CNB acquired 51% ownership of Cherokee CRC in 2005. Cherokee CRC provides consulting and engineering services, predominantly in the areas of aerospace, construction, environmental and professional services
- Cherokee Nation Construction Services (CNCS) provides general contracting services and construction management
- Cherokee Nation Environmental Solutions (CNES) - provide environmental services for both commercial and governmental clients

=== Technology ===
Division President: Steven Bilby

CNB's Technology Division provides a full spectrum of IT services and technology solutions. It offers management and support of programs, projects, professionals and technical staff, with a primary focus on information technology, mission support, and research and development

- Cherokee Services Group (CSG) provides management information services, network infrastructure management, and software development
- Cherokee Nation Technologies (CNT) markets professional services to commercial enterprises
- Cherokee Nation Technology Solutions (CNTS) provides technical support services and project support personnel to defense and civilian agency clients in the areas of information technology, science, engineering, construction, research & development, facilities management, program management, strategic communications, and mission support.
- Cherokee Nation Government Solutions (CNGS) provides technical support to governmental client in the areas of science, engineering, construction, information technology, facilities management, and mission support

=== Cultural & Economic Development ===
- Visit Cherokee Nation (operates 6 museums)
- Osiyo, Voices of the Cherokee People (documentary television series)
- Cherokee Springs Plaza
- Cherokee Nation Film Office

== Renewable Energy ==
In 2011, Cherokee Nation Businesses began the process to expand its business operations in renewable energy operations. In December 2011, the Cherokee Nation Tribal Council authorized CNB to seek a grant from the United States Department of the Interior in order to construct a $144 million hydroelectric dam along the Arkansas River in Sequoyah County, Oklahoma. The dam is expected to be completed by 2015 and generate between $10 million and $15 million in annual revenues for CNB. After winning Tribal Council approval in December 2012, CNB plans to construct a wind energy farm in Kay County, Oklahoma, with financial support from a grant by the United States Department of Energy's Office of Energy Efficiency and Renewable Energy. Once fully construction, the wind farm is expected the generate between $16 million and $19 million in annual revenues for CNB.

== See also ==
- Cherokee Nation
