= Bill John Baker =

Principal Chief of the Cherokee Nation

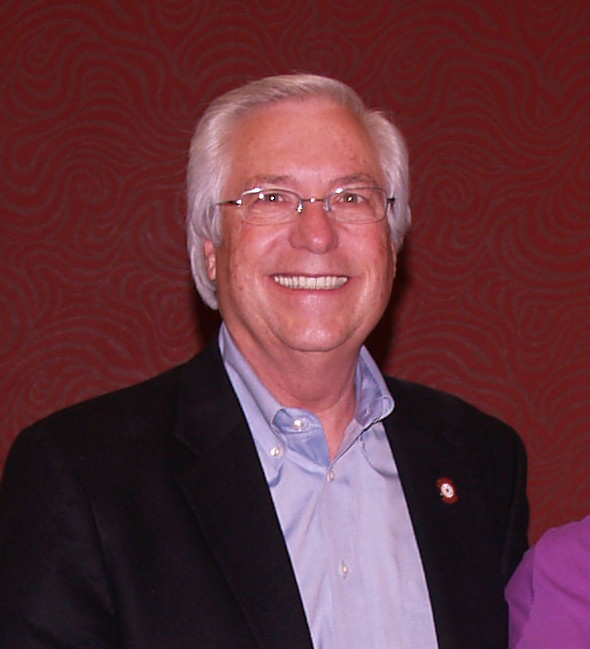
- Baker in 2013

7th Principal Chief of the Cherokee Nation
- In office October 19, 2011 – August 14, 2019
- Preceded by: Joe Crittenden (acting)
- Succeeded by: Chuck Hoskin Jr.

Cherokee Nation Tribal Councilor
- In office 2003–2011
- Preceded by: John Ketcher
- Succeeded by: Joe Byrd
- In office 1995–1999

Personal details
- Born: February 9, 1952 (age 74) Tahlequah, Oklahoma, U.S.
- Party: Democratic
- Spouse: Sherry Robertson
- Education: Northeastern State University (BA)

Bill John Baker (born February 9, 1952) is a Cherokee politician who served as Principal Chief of the Cherokee Nation. First elected in October 2011, Baker defeated three-term incumbent Chief Chad "Corntassel" Smith. Prior to his election as Chief, Baker served 12 years on the Cherokee Tribal Council. In 1999, Baker unsuccessfully ran for Deputy Chief of the Cherokee Nation.

== Background ==
Bill John Baker was born in Cherokee County, Oklahoma, where his family has been for four generations. Of mixed ethnicity, like many Cherokee citizens, he is 1/32 (3.1%) Cherokee by blood. He graduated from Tahlequah High School in 1969 and from Northeastern State University in 1972 with a bachelor's degree in political science and history.

== Career ==
After graduating from college, Baker invested in a furniture store and built Baker Furniture into a thriving business in Tahlequah, Oklahoma. He also owns several rental properties in Tahlequah.

While simultaneously growing his business, Baker was active in the community, having served as the president of the PTA, a coach for youth sports and a charter member of the Rotary Club. As the elected president of the Tahlequah area Chamber of Commerce, he pulled the organization out of debt during his tenure.

== Politics ==
He served 12 years as a member of the Cherokee Nation Tribal Council. During his tenure on the tribal council, Baker served on every standing committee of the Cherokee Nation Tribal Council. He has supported educational and development initiatives for Cherokee, as well as health care.

In 1997, Baker was among the supporters of Joe Byrd, then Principal Chief, during some of the tumultuous political events of 1997, when some members boycotted attendance at Council meetings. At one point, the Nation's executive officials' closed the Cherokee Nation Judicial Appeals Tribunal. Byrd was investigated for financial improprieties.

In 1999, Baker ran for deputy chief as a running mate of Joe Byrd. In an extremely close race, Baker was defeated by Hasting Shade, with Shade getting 3,579 votes to Baker's 3,533 votes.

In 2011, Baker ran for Cherokee Nation principal chief against the 12-year incumbent Chad Smith. Because the Cherokee Nation Supreme Court could not determine the outcome of the June 26 general election with mathematical certainty, it set a second election for Sept. 24, 2011. The date for absentee ballots was extended to allow for voting by Cherokee Freedmen, based on a negotiated agreement with the federal government. The membership of many in the tribe and ability to vote in elections has been under dispute since the tribe (exclusive of the Freedmen) voted to tighten membership qualifications.

Baker won the special election. Nearly 20,000 people voted in the special election in September, 5,000 more than had voted in the first one. Baker won by 1,534 votes with nearly 54 percent of the vote. By agreement between the federal government and the tribe in a negotiated decision, Cherokee Freedmen were allowed to vote in this election. At the time Cherokee Freedmen were not recognized as equal citizens. As of 2017, the Cherokee Nation removed language excluding Freedmen, granting them full citizenship.

Baker endorsed President Barack Obama for reelection in 2012, saying that Obama “is the best president for Indian country in the history of the United States.”

== Accomplishments ==
After taking office, Baker quickly sold the Cherokee Nation’s private plane and invested the proceeds into contract health care for Cherokee citizens.

During his first year in office, 750 new Cherokees were hired. Creating good jobs for Cherokee citizens is a high priority for Baker. The Cherokee Nation’s casino in Ramona, OK opened in 2012 and 100% of the employees were Cherokee citizens.

In 2012, Baker revitalized the Cherokee Nation’s housing program and the Nation began building houses again for the first time in more than a decade. Cherokee citizens are now able to own their own home with this program. Baker promised more access to Cherokee homes.

In March 2013, Baker announced $100 million from Cherokee Nation Businesses' profits would be invested into expanded health care for Cherokee citizens. New facilities and expanded services will reduce wait times and improve the quality of accessible health care for tribal citizens. The Cherokee Nation health care system is the largest tribally operated health system in the United States.

In 2013, Baker announced the Cherokee Nation and Cherokee Nation Businesses (CNB) had a record breaking year in profits and have a $1.3 Billion dollar economic impact in Oklahoma. A research study by an Oklahoma City University economist shows the tribe’s activities directly and indirectly support more than 14,000 jobs and provide more than $559 million in income payments.

Under Baker, the Cherokee Nation increased funding to its college scholarships program. More Cherokee citizens are able to pursue their dream and college education with the record investment.

Baker has made Cherokee language preservation and promotion a priority, saying at the White House Native youth conference: "Our Cherokee Language Immersion School has proven to be effective for our youngest children, and the Cherokee Speaker’s Bureau is a wonderful tool for our elders to congregate and speak the language [...] Cherokee Nation Tribal Youth Council is launching the Gen-I Cherokee Language 2020 Challenge. It is an effort to challenge Cherokee citizens to do their part in speaking or learning the Cherokee language. Pledge forms have been created for individuals and families to accept the Cherokee Language 2020 Challenge, which challenges all of us to speak Cherokee daily and to encourage others to learn the language. In 2020, just five years from now, we can reassess the number of Cherokee speakers on behalf of the youth council and see if their targeted outreach was effective. These youth ambassadors have met with Cherokee Nation department leaders and other stakeholders to implement and promote their five-year plan. It’s especially encouraging for this age group because Cherokee is now available on so many smartphones, computers and other technology-driven platforms."

== Personal ==
Baker married Susan Elizabeth "Beth" Hulcher on August 1, 1977. The couple had three daughters and two sons. She died on April 28, 1995.

He married Sherry Jean Robertson, and the couple live in Tahlequah. He is a member of the Baptist Church.

Political offices
Preceded by Joe Crittenden; Acting	Principal Chief of the Cherokee Nation; 2011–2019	Succeeded by Chuck Hoskin
