= Joe Crittenden =

American politician

Secretary of Veterans Affairs of the Cherokee Nation
- Incumbent
- Assumed office 2019
- Preceded by: position established

Deputy Chief of the Cherokee Nation
- In office October 19, 2011 – August 14, 2019
- Preceded by: Joe Grayson
- Succeeded by: Bryan Warner

Interim Principal Chief of the Cherokee Nation
- In office July 2011 – October 19, 2011
- Preceded by: Chad Smith
- Succeeded by: Bill John Baker

Cherokee Nation Tribal Councilor
- In office 2003–2011

Joe Crittenden (né Stanley Joe Crittenden; born 1944) is a Cherokee Nation politician who has served as the Cherokee Nation Secretary of Veteran Affairs since 2019. He previously served on the tribal council, as deputy chief, and Principal Chief of the Cherokee Nation in 2011.

== Career ==
Crittenden was elected to the Cherokee Nation tribal council in 2003. In 2011 he was elected deputy chief of the Cherokee Nation, but a dispute in the election for principal chief requiring a special election required him to briefly serve as Principal Chief of the Cherokee Nation. After Bill John Baker was elected, he succeeded Crittenden who resumed his position as deputy chief. He was re-elected deputy chief in 2015. In 2019, the Cherokee Nation Supreme Court ruled that Crittenden could not run for a third consecutive term in 2019, even though he did not serve the entirety of his first term due to serving as acting Principal Chief, because the Cherokee Constitution limits elected officials to two consecutive terms. His term ended on August 14, 2019. In 2019, he was appointed as the first Cherokee Nation Secretary of Veterans Affairs by Principal Chief Chuck Hoskin Jr.
