= Taralee Montgomery =

Cherokee government official

Deputy Cherokee Nation Secretary of State
- Incumbent
- Assumed office August 2023
- Appointed by: Chuck Hoskin Jr.

Personal details
- Born: c. 1992

Taralee Montgomery (born c. 1992) is a Cherokee government official serving as a deputy secretary of state of the Cherokee Nation since 2023.

== Life ==
Montgomery was born c. 1992. Her career with the Cherokee Nation began in the communications department in 2019, where she started as a photographer. She later transitioned to a role as a special project officer under principal chief Chuck Hoskin Jr. In 2022, she was appointed a senior advisor for public policy. In this capacity, she continued as the primary liaison between the administration, executive branch departments, and Cherokee Nation entities. Her expanded role involved analyzing and developing tribal legislation and policies. During this time, Montgomery worked under secretary of state Tina Glory-Jordan involved in various policy initiatives, including inclusive family leave, legislative drafting, external partnerships, executive orders, and grant facilitation. Montgomery worked closely with Kim Teehee, the proposed Cherokee delegate to the United States House of Representatives, for six years. She has been a strong advocate for the Cherokee Nation's right to a congressional delegate, as promised in the 1835 Treaty of New Echota.

In August 2023 during Hoskin Jr.'s the administration's second term, Montgomery was appointed as a deputy secretary of state under Shella Bowlin. In this capacity, she focuses on policy evaluation and development across government programs. Her role involves addressing gender equity issues, including wage compression and gender pay equity. She works with the Cherokee Nation tribal council and developing policies and legislative initiatives to improve the lives of Cherokee Nation employees, citizens, and communities.

== See also ==
- List of Native American politicians
- Native American women in politics
