= 2023 Cherokee Nation tribal council elections =

- June 3, 2023 (general); July 8, 2023 (runoff)

8 of the 17 seats in the Tribal Council

The 2023 Cherokee Nation tribal council elections took place concurrently with the 2023 Cherokee Nation principal chief election and 2023 Cherokee Nation deputy chief election on June 3, 2023, with runoff elections, where necessary, held on July 8, 2023.

The Cherokee Nation's Tribal Council is made up of seventeen Tribal Councilors elected from the fifteen districts within the reservation boundaries and two at-large seats.

In 2023, tribal council elections were scheduled to be held for districts 1, 3, 6, 8, 12, 13, 14, and for one of the at-large seats.

== Background ==
The 2023 Cherokee Nation elections were scheduled to take place on June 3, 2023, with runoff elections scheduled for July 8, 2023. The swearing in of elected officials took place on August 14, 2023. The election was the first election where the Cherokee Nation Election Commission had an in-house investigator to investigate election code violations. The election also utilized 70 new voting machines to replace the older 2012 models used in prior elections. Eight out of the seventeen seats on the Cherokee Nation Tribal Council were scheduled to have elections in 2023. In order to win a seat on the Tribal Council, a candidate must receive 50% plus one vote. If no candidate received 50% plus one vote, then a runoff election was held between the two top vote earning candidates.

As of May 2023, there were 78,419 registered voters – 44,592 within the reservation and 33,827 at-large.

== Legal issues ==
A complaint by District 1 candidate Trae Ratliff alleged that absentee ballots could be read through envelopes with the use of a flashlight. While the Cherokee Nation Election Commission made clear the envelopes were the same as past elections, they unanimously voted to order heavier envelopes for the runoff election and all future elections.

== Retiring ==
=== Term limited ===
- Rex Jordan, District 1
- Shawn Crittenden, District 8
- Keith Austin, District 14

=== Retiring ===
- Wes Nofire, District 3 (ran for principal chief)

== Results ==
District 1
| Candidate | First round | | Second round | |
| Candidate | Votes | % | Votes | % |
|---|---|---|---|---|
| Sasha Blackfox-Qualls | 686 | 45.07 | 753 | 56.15 |
| Dale Lee Glory | 586 | 38.50 | 588 | 43.85 |
| Trae Ratliff | 161 | 10.58 | | |
| Brian Jackson | 89 | 5.85 | | |
| Total | 1,522 | 100.00 | 1,341 | 100.00 |
| Valid votes | 1,522 | 99.67 | 1,341 | 100.00 |
| Invalid/blank votes | 5 | 0.33 | 0 | 0.00 |
| Total votes | 1,527 | 100.00 | 1,341 | 100.00 |

District 3
| Candidate | First round | | Second round | |
| Candidate | Votes | % | Votes | % |
|---|---|---|---|---|
| Lisa Hall | 500 | 43.55 | 508 | 62.10 |
| Sara Drywater-Barnett | 333 | 29.01 | 310 | 37.90 |
| Joseph Tali Byrd | 115 | 10.02 | | |
| Dyllon Fite | 85 | 7.40 | | |
| Brandon L. Girty | 75 | 6.53 | | |
| Brian Speake | 40 | 3.48 | | |
| Total | 1,148 | 100.00 | 818 | 100.00 |
| Valid votes | 1,148 | 99.14 | 818 | 100.00 |
| Invalid/blank votes | 10 | 0.86 | 0 | 0.00 |
| Total votes | 1,158 | 100.00 | 818 | 100.00 |

District 6
| Candidate | Votes | % |
|---|---|---|
| Daryl Legg | 884 | 76.14 |
| Steve Russell | 221 | 19.04 |
| Dustin W. Bush | 56 | 4.82 |
| Total | 1,161 | 100.00 |
| Valid votes | 1,161 | 99.15 |
| Invalid/blank votes | 10 | 0.85 |
| Total votes | 1,171 | 100.00 |

District 8
| Candidate | First round | | Second round | |
| Candidate | Votes | % | Votes | % |
|---|---|---|---|---|
| Codey Poindexter | 324 | 39.32 | 413 | 61.64 |
| Jillian Decker | 165 | 20.02 | 257 | 38.36 |
| John Teehee | 91 | 11.04 | | |
| Jerry Don Hardbarger | 64 | 7.77 | | |
| Troy Littledeer | 63 | 7.65 | | |
| Timothy Fishinghawk | 62 | 7.52 | | |
| Jon Minor | 55 | 6.67 | | |
| Total | 824 | 100.00 | 670 | 100.00 |
| Valid votes | 824 | 99.76 | 670 | 100.00 |
| Invalid/blank votes | 2 | 0.24 | 0 | 0.00 |
| Total votes | 826 | 100.00 | 670 | 100.00 |

District 12
| Candidate | Votes | % |
|---|---|---|
| Dora Patzkowski | 587 | 81.08 |
| Crystal St. John | 137 | 18.92 |
| Total | 724 | 100.00 |
| Valid votes | 724 | 98.37 |
| Invalid/blank votes | 12 | 1.63 |
| Total votes | 736 | 100.00 |

District 13
| Candidate | Votes | % |
|---|---|---|
| Joe Deere | 533 | 78.61 |
| Ed Phillips | 145 | 21.39 |
| Total | 678 | 100.00 |
| Valid votes | 678 | 96.58 |
| Invalid/blank votes | 24 | 3.42 |
| Total votes | 702 | 100.00 |

District 14
| Candidate | Votes | % |
|---|---|---|
| Kevin Easley Jr. | 847 | 74.89 |
| Warren L. Murray | 190 | 16.80 |
| Carrie Ann Vargas | 94 | 8.31 |
| Total | 1,131 | 100.00 |
| Valid votes | 1,131 | 99.30 |
| Invalid/blank votes | 8 | 0.70 |
| Total votes | 1,139 | 100.00 |

At-large district
| Candidate | Votes | % |
|---|---|---|
| Julia Coates | 2,640 | 72.47 |
| James Smay | 452 | 12.41 |
| Jared Coody | 355 | 9.74 |
| Craig Hood | 196 | 5.38 |
| Total | 3,643 | 100.00 |
| Valid votes | 3,643 | 98.04 |
| Invalid/blank votes | 73 | 1.96 |
| Total votes | 3,716 | 100.00 |
