= Madison Whitekiller =

American of Native ancestry

- Education: Verdigris High School, Claremore, Oklahoma
- Occupations: Student, Northeastern State University
- Title: Miss Cherokee 2017-18

Madison Whitekiller is a Native American woman from Cherokee Nation who was crowned Miss Cherokee 2017–2018 while a student at Northeastern State University. As part of the role, she served as a goodwill ambassador to promote the history, language, and culture of the Cherokee tribefor a year.

Whitekiller was named Miss Cherokee on August 26, 2017 after competing against six other young women. The annual competition is held conjunction with the Cherokee National Holiday. The competition judges contestants on their use of the Cherokee language, their cultural and platform presentations, and their responses to impromptu questions. For her cultural presentation during the competition, Whitekiller focused on empowering Cherokee women through the traditional Cherokee story of why the corn husk doll has no face.

Whitekiller is from Claremore, Oklahoma, and studied at Northeastern State University in Tahlequah, Oklahoma. She previously served as Junior Miss Cherokee 2015–16.
