= Mary Baker Shaw =

Cherokee politician

Cherokee Nation Tribal Councilor for the at-large district
- In office August 14, 2017 – August 2021
- Succeeded by: Johnny Jack Kidwell

Personal details
- Citizenship: Cherokee Nation; United States

Mary Baker Shaw is a Cherokee politician who served as an at-large tribal councilor for the Cherokee Nation from 2017 to 2021.

== Career ==
Baker Shaw won the Cherokee Nation Tribal Council's At-Large seat in the June 3, 2017 election. She secured a victory with 56.77% of the vote, receiving 847 votes out of the total cast. This margin was sufficient to avoid a runoff election. Her closest competitors in the election were Shane Jett, who received 19.64% of the vote (293 vote) and Linda Leaf-Bolin, who finished third with 11.33% of the vote (169 votes). Baker Shaw was one of nine Cherokee Nation Tribal Councilors sworn into office on August 14, 2017, at a ceremony held in the Sequoyah High School gymnasium. She represented Cherokee citizens living outside the tribe's jurisdictional boundaries as one of two at-large councilors alongside Wanda Hatfield.

Baker Shaw co-sponsored legislation with fellow at-large councilor Julia Coates to provide glasses to at-large Cherokees who have their eyes examined at Cherokee Nation health clinics. She served as chair of the Health Committee, where she addressed the issue of physician turnover. She formed a subgroup that implemented solutions, resulting in a reduction in provider turnover from losing 100 out of 125 physicians in a 5-year period to less than 4% turnover. Baker Shaw supported the launch of cherokeesatlarge.org to provide timely information to the at-large Cherokee population. She did not run for reelection when her four-year term concluded in 2021. She was succeeded by Johnny Jack Kidwell.

== See also ==
- List of Native American politicians
- Native American women in politics
