= Cherokee Nation Tribal Council =

Legislative branch of the Cherokee Nation government in the US

Cherokee Nation Tribal Council ᏗᏂᎧᎾᏩᏗᏙᎯ ᎠᏂᏯᎥᎢ

Type
- Type: Unicameral

History
- Founded: 1839

Leadership
- Council Speaker: Johnny Jack Kidwell (I)

Structure
- Seats: 17
- Length of term: 4 Years, no limits

Elections
- Last election: July 8, 2025
- Next election: July 8, 2027

Website
- www.cherokee.org/our-government/legislative-branch/

The Cherokee Nation tribal council (officially: Council of the Cherokee Nation; Cherokee: ᏗᏂᎧᎾᏩᏗᏙᎯ ᎠᏂᏯᎥᎢ, romanized: dinikahnawadidohi aniyavvi) is the legislative branch of the Cherokee Nation. One councilor is elected to represent each of the 15 districts of the Cherokee Nation in the 14 county tribal jurisdictional area. Two tribal council members represent the at-large citizenry – those who live outside the tribe's 14-county jurisdictional area in northeastern Oklahoma. The 17 councilors total are elected to staggered four-year terms.

== Structure ==
The Cherokee Nation tribal council consists of 17 members:

- 15 councilors representing districts within the Cherokee Nation's jurisdictional boundaries
- 2 at-large councilors representing citizens living outside these boundaries

Council members are elected by popular vote to serve staggered four-year terms. The council is presided over by an elected speaker who serves as its president. The deputy chief serves as president of the council, and casts tie-breaking votes when necessary.

The 15 election districts are reviewed decennially and the boundaries are redrawn as necessary to balance changes in the population. The next redistricting is planned to take effect ahead of the 2025 Cherokee Nation elections.

=== Youth tribal council ===
The Cherokee Nation Youth Tribal Council engages young Cherokee citizens in tribal governance and cultural preservation. Members participate in official functions and introduce themselves in both Cherokee and English, showcasing their bilingual skills. This involvement reflects the Cherokee Nation's commitment to cultivating future leaders and maintaining cultural continuity, while providing youth with experience in tribal governance and public speaking.

== Functions and responsibilities ==
According to Article VI, Section 3 of the Cherokee Constitution, "The Council shall establish its rules for its credentials, decorum and procedure." The tribal council's primary responsibilities include:

- Enacting laws for the Cherokee Nation
- Managing financial oversight
- Representing the interests of Cherokee citizens
- Approving appointments to various tribal boards and commissions

The tribal council holds monthly meetings, typically on the second Monday of each month. These meetings are open to the public and often livestreamed to promote transparency.

== Current councilors ==
Tribal Councilors
District	Councilor	First elected	Next Re-election Year	Officers
1	Sasha Blackfox-Qualls	2023	2027	
2	Candessa Tehee	2021	2029	
3	Lisa Hall	2023	2027	
4	Uriah Grass	2025	2029	
5	Ashley Grant	2025	2029	
6	Daryl Legg	2019	2027	
7	Joshua Sam	2021	2029	Secretary
8	Codey Poindexter	2023	2027	
9	Clifton Hughes	2025	2029	
10	Melvina Shotpouch	2021	2029	
11	Kendra McGeady	2024	2029	
12	Dora Patzkowski	2019	2027	
13	Joe Deere	2019	2027	
14	Kevin Easley Jr.	2023	2027	Deputy Speaker
15	Danny Callison	2021	2029	
At-Large	Johnny Jack Kidwell	2021	2029	Council Speaker
At-Large	Julia Coates	2019	2027	

== History ==
The roots of the Tribal Council can be traced to the early 1800s when Cherokee towns were the basic political units, each with its own council handling local affairs. These independent towns were united by shared culture, language, and history, rather than formal political mechanisms. The Cherokee national capitol, located at Echota in present-day Tennessee, served as a central gathering place for major events and decision-making.

The current structure of the Tribal Council evolved from earlier forms of Cherokee governance. The Cherokee Nation has a long history of representative government, dating back to the early 19th century when the tribe established a bicameral legislature in their southeastern homeland. The tribal council has been actively involved in language preservation efforts. In 2019, speaker Joe Byrd highlighted the progress made in promoting the Cherokee language, noting the presence of Cherokee language in public spaces and media. The council has addressed issues such as language preservation, healthcare, and economic development. In 2021, the council approved a $3 billion comprehensive budget for fiscal year 2022, the largest in the tribe's history.

== Speakers ==
- Tina Glory-Jordan (2012-2015)
- Joe Byrd (2015-2021)
- Mike Shambaugh (2021-present)

== Former councilors ==
- Keith Austin
- Mary Baker Shaw
- Bill John Baker
- Joe Crittenden
- Agnes Cowen
- Shawn Crittenden
- Meredith Frailey
- Janelle Fullbright
- Tina Glory
- Frankie Hargis
- Wanda Hatfield
- Chuck Hoskin
- Chuck Hoskin Jr.
- Linda Hughes O'Leary
- Rex Jordan
- Wes Nofire
- Troy Poteete
- Audra Smoke-Conner
- Barbara Starr Scott
- Janees Taylor
- Victoria Vazquez
- David Walkingstick
- Cara Cowan Watts
- Phyllis Yargee

== See also ==
- List of Principal Chiefs of the Cherokee
- Secretary of State of the Cherokee Nation
