= E. O. Smith (Cherokee politician) =

American politician

Cherokee Nation Tribal Council for the 5th district
- In office 2017 – August 2025
- Preceded by: David Thornton
- Succeeded by: Ashley Grant

Personal details
- Born: November 22, 1950 (age 75) Eunice, New Mexico, U.S.
- Citizenship: Cherokee Nation; American

E. O. Smith is an American and Cherokee politician who has served on the Cherokee Nation Tribal Council since 2017.

== Early life and career ==
E. O. Smith was born in Eunice, New Mexico, on November 22, 1950, to Olin and Hazel Smith. In 1952, the family moved to Vian, Oklahoma, where Smith graduated high school in 1969. He worked for the Cherokee Nation, of which he is a citizen, as a warehouse supervisor in Sallisaw, Oklahoma, from 2008 to 2016. In 2006, Smith was pulled over for a cracked windshield by Vian Police. Smith called his uncle, Vian City Councilor James Smith, and the pair were arrested after the elder Smith threatened the officer's job. The district attorney declined to file charges against James Smith, but called his actions inappropriate.

== Cherokee Tribal Council ==
In 2017, Smith ran for the Cherokee Nation Tribal Council 5th district to succeed David Thornton. He faced Uriah Grass and Dink Scott in the general election. During the election, Smith's son was arrested by the Vian Police Department. Smith served on the Vian City Council and shortly after the arrest both the arresting officer and police chief resigned, citing pressure from city officials. He advanced to a runoff alongside Scott, and later won the election. He won reelection in 2021, defeating challengers R. L. Bell and Richard W. Tyler.

In 2024, Smith ran a primary campaign for the Oklahoma House of Representatives' 2nd district against incumbent Jim Olsen. Olsen won the primary with 58% of the vote.
