= Troy Poteete =

Cherokee politician (1955–2026)

Justice of the Cherokee Nation Supreme Court
- In office 2007–2017
- Preceded by: Stacy Leeds
- Succeeded by: Mark L. Dobbins

Cherokee Nation Tribal Councilor
- In office 1991–1999

Personal details
- Born: Troy Wayne Poteete; March 6, 1955 Muskogee, Oklahoma, U.S.
- Died: February 5, 2026 (aged 70) Vian, Oklahoma, U.S.
- Cause of death: Gunshot wound

Troy Wayne Poteete (March 6, 1955 – February 5, 2026) was a Cherokee politician and jurist who served on the Cherokee Nation Tribal Council from 1991 to 1999 and the Cherokee Nation Supreme Court from 2007 to 2017.

== Biography ==
Troy Wayne Poteete was born on March 6, 1955, in Muskogee, Oklahoma, to Edward Luther Poteete and Erma Lois Renfro. He was a Cherokee Nation citizen. He served on the Cherokee Nation Tribal Council from 1991 to 1999 representing the Three Rivers District. He graduated from the University of Tulsa College of Law in 2001 and was appointed to the Cherokee Nation Supreme Court in 2007. He left the court in 2017.

He was shot and killed on February 5, 2026, in Vian, Oklahoma. His wife was later charged with his murder by the Cherokee Nation.
