= Linda Hughes O'Leary =

Cherokee politician (born 1950)

Cherokee Nation Tribal Councilor for the 5th district
- In office 2003–2007 Serving with Melvina Shotpouch

Personal details
- Born: April 9, 1950 (age 76) Tulsa, Oklahoma, U.S.
- Citizenship: Cherokee Nation; United States
- Children: 3
- Education: Northeastern State University

Linda Hughes O'Leary (born April 9, 1950) is a Cherokee politician who served on the Cherokee Nation tribal council for district 5 from 2003 to 2007.

== Life ==
Hughes O'Leary was born on April 9, 1950, in Tulsa, Oklahoma, to Clinton "Webb" Hughes and Frankie Lou Potter Hughes. She is a descendant of original Cherokee enrollees, with her grandparents being Ezekiel "Zeke" and Katie Kaiser Hughes, and John and Nina "Pug" Beck Hendren Potter. Hughes O'Leary graduated from Colcord High School and later attended Northeastern State University, where she earned a bachelor's degree in education with a minor in sociology.

Hughes O'Leary began her career at the U.S. Department of Human Services, where she worked for 19 years. During her time there, she specialized in child protection services, home studies, adult services, and medical clinic eligibility within the welfare department. Following her career in social services, she established her own bail bond business in Oklahoma, where she has been operating for over 15 years as of 2003.

In 2003, Hughes O'Leary and Melvina Shotpouch were elected to represent the multi-member district 5 of the Cherokee Nation tribal council. She focused on issues such as education, housing, healthcare, and cultural preservation.

As of 2003, Hughes O'Leary resides in Jay, Oklahoma, with her husband, Larry O'Leary. They have three children.

== See also ==
- List of Native American politicians
- Native American women in politics
