= Audra Smoke-Conner =

Cherokee politician (born 1968)

Cherokee Nation Tribal Councilor for the 1st district
- In office 2003–2007
- Preceded by: Don Crittenden
- Succeeded by: Tina Glory-Jordan

Personal details
- Born: August 10, 1968 (age 58)
- Citizenship: Cherokee Nation; United States
- Children: 3
- Education: Northeastern State University
- Awards: Miss Cherokee (1988)

Audra Smoke-Conner (born August 10, 1968) is a Cherokee politician who served on the Cherokee Nation tribal council for district 1 from 2003 to 2007.

== Early life and education ==
Audra Smoke-Conner was born on August 10, 1968, to William and Deborah Smoke and Terri Stoner. She grew up in Spavinaw, Oklahoma, where she attended grade school and junior high, later graduating from Ketchum High School in 1986. She attended Northeastern State University (NSU), where she participated in work-study programs and worked for the Cherokee Nation's Summer Youth Employment Program.

During her college years, Smoke-Conner competed for the title of Miss Cherokee three consecutive times, winning the title in 1988 after two prior attempts. As Miss Cherokee, she served as an ambassador for the Cherokee Nation, visiting various communities and sharing the tribe's history and future aspirations. Smoke-Conner earned a bachelor's degree in mass communications from NSU in 1989, specializing in television and radio broadcasting. In May 2000, she earned a master's degree in college teaching.

== Career ==
Since 1991, Audra Smoke-Conner has worked as a guidance specialist at the American Indian Resource Center in Tahlequah, Oklahoma. Her role involves promoting post-secondary education among students in Mayes and Adair Counties, encouraging them to pursue educational training for improved job opportunities.

In May 2003, she was elected to the Cherokee Nation tribal council, representing District 1. As a council member, Smoke-Conner focused on informing citizens about available tribal services and programs, as well as addressing housing and education funding concerns. She served on several council committees, including education, executive finance, health, language and culture, rules, resources, and employment, the latter of which she chairs. Smoke-Conner expressed a desire to enhance communication between the Cherokee Nation and local communities, particularly by organizing community meetings and working to increase Cherokee cultural and language activities in local schools. Additionally, she advocated for the establishment of a Head Start facility in northern Cherokee County. Smoke-Conner ran for re-election in 2007 but was defeated in a run-off election by Tina Glory-Jordan, a local attorney and former Cherokee Nation district court judge. In the run-off, Smoke-Conner received 580 votes (37.04%) compared to Glory-Jordan's 986 votes (62.96%).

== Personal life ==
Smoke-Conner married to D.J. Conner and they have three children: Trey, Lynsey, and Macey. As of 2004, the family resided in Peggs, Oklahoma.

== See also ==
- List of Native American politicians
- Native American women in politics
