= Cherokee marbles =

Traditional Cherokee game

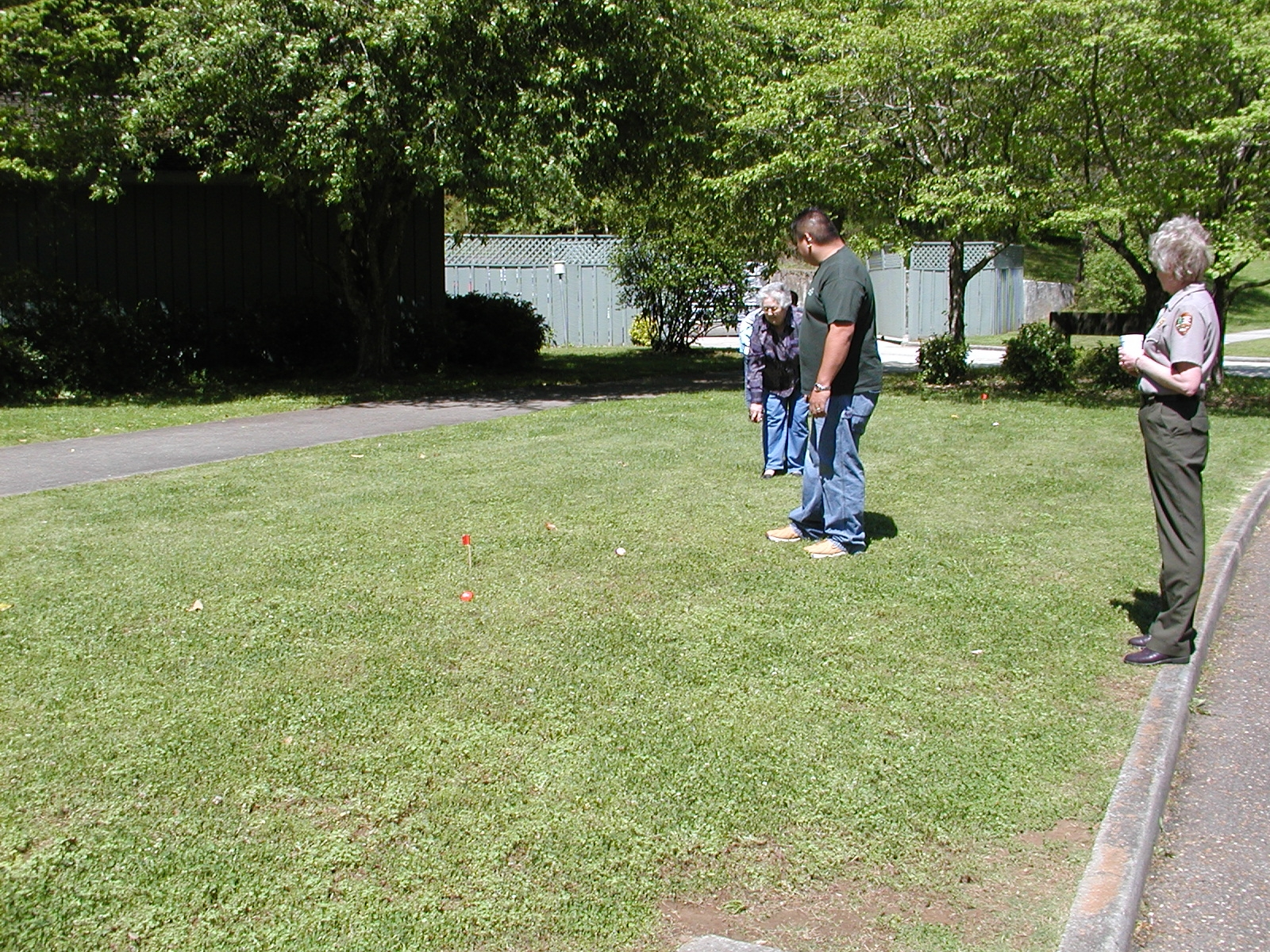
A game of Cherokee marbles being played at the Russell Cave National Monument in Alabama

Cherokee marbles (Cherokee: ᏗᎦᏓᏲᏍᏗ, romanized: digadayosdi) or five hole is a traditional game among the Cherokee people of the United States, in which players roll small stone balls between five shallow pits dug into a playing field. Today, the game is commonly played with billiard balls. The game may be played in individual or team play, and in this century, has been introduced into the curricula of students attending schools in the Cherokee Nation. There is also a national tournament held annually during the Cherokee National Holiday.

== History ==
The origin of this traditional Cherokee game is unknown, and it is not mentioned in the works of ethnologist James Mooney. Cherokee marbles is a game similar to rolley hole, an Anglo-American game comprising at least two teams of marble players, although the dimensions are different and rolley hole uses three holes instead of five. Cherokee marbles incorporates elements which are also found in such diverse games as croquet, bocce ball, and billiards. In the early 21st century, the game was introduced into public schools in northeast Oklahoma, by the Cherokee Nation, as part of a program to discourage methamphetamine abuse.

== The game ==
Cherokee marbles is a game of rolling small stone balls towards a target

Cherokee marbles was traditionally played with round balls made of stone. Today billiard balls are typically used, with a favorite being the cue ball. An annual tournament is held during Cherokee National Holiday each Labor Day weekend.

=== Rules ===
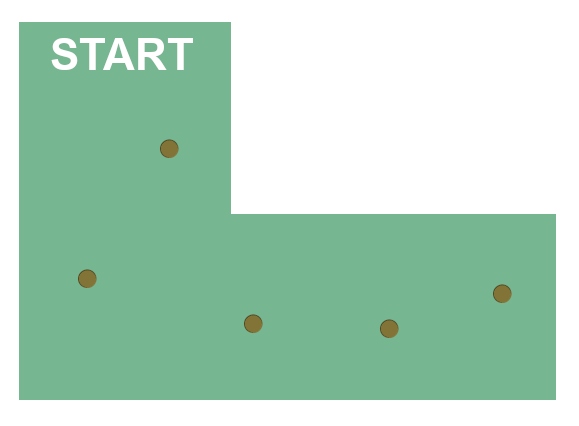
A typical playing field

The game is played on a field about 100 feet in length and shaped like an "L" with five shallow holes, about two inches in diameter, approximately 10 to 12 feet apart, the fifth hole being located at the end of the long arm of the "L."

To determine who starts, players stand at the second hole and throw a marble back at the first hole. The first to get their marble in the hole becomes the start player for the main game. Players move to the start line and take turns rolling their marble. Once a player's marble has reached the second hole, they are permitted to hit opponents' marbles out of the way. To win, a player's marble must visit all five holes in sequence, then travel back through the first four holes, ending back at the first.

=== Players ===
There can be any number of individual players however during team competitions each team must have an equal number of participants. In today's tournaments a three person team is preferred. There is an official rulebook which is used in tournament play.

== See also ==
- Chunkey
