= Tina Glory =

Cherokee politician

Tina Glory was a Cherokee politician who served on the Cherokee Nation tribal council. She joined in 1996 after she was selected to replace her husband who had died.

== Life ==
Glory was a member of the Cherokee Nation. She was the mother of jurist and politician Tina Glory Jordan.

In September 1996, Glory was selected by the Cherokee Nation tribal council to replace her deceased husband on the council. She accepted this position and was sworn in as a member of the tribal council on September 17, 1996. Her appointment to the tribal council had significant implications for her daughter's career. The Cherokee Nation Judicial Appeals Tribunal had previously ruled that if Tina Glory took a seat on the tribal council, her daughter would become ineligible to continue serving as a district judge due to tribal laws regarding nepotism.

== See also ==
- List of Native American politicians
- Native American women in politics
