= Peggs, Oklahoma =

Unincorporated community in Oklahoma, US

- Census-designated place
- Location within Cherokee County and the state of Oklahoma
- Coordinates: 36°04′02″N 95°04′18″W
- Country: United States
- State: Oklahoma
- County: Cherokee

Area
  - Total: 15.31 sq mi (39.65 km^{2})
  - Land: 15.31 sq mi (39.65 km^{2})
  - Water: 0 sq mi (0.00 km^{2})
- Elevation: 984 ft (300 m)

Population (2020)
  - Total: 789
  - Density: 52/sq mi (19.9/km^{2})
- Time zone: UTC-6 (Central (CST))
  - Summer (DST): UTC-5 (CDT)
- ZIP codes: 74452
- FIPS code: 40-57950
- GNIS feature ID: 2584388

Peggs is an unincorporated community and census-designated place (CDP) in Cherokee County, Oklahoma, United States. It is located between Locust Grove to the northwest and Tahlequah to the southeast, along State Highway 82. As of the 2020 census, Peggs had a population of 789. A large minority of its residents are Native American, most of them members of 10 tribal groups such as the Cherokee Nation and the Muscogee Creek Nation.

== History ==
The post office was established December 6, 1899. It was named for Thomas Pegg, acting principal chief of the Cherokee Nation during the Civil War.

A tornado destroyed Peggs on May 2, 1920, killing 71 people, what was about 30 percent of the town's population at the time. It is the deadliest tornado on record to have struck within NWS Tulsa's county warning area, and the third-deadliest in Oklahoma history (after Woodward in 1947 and Snyder pre-statehood in 1905). In May 2019 another tornado hit Peggs, but the EF-2 caused no fatalities, only damage to a few homes and businesses.

== Geography ==
Peggs is located in northwestern Cherokee County, along Oklahoma State Highway 82, which leads southeast 15 miles (24 km) to Tahlequah, the county seat, and northwest 10 miles (16 km) to Locust Grove in Mayes County.

According to the U.S. Census Bureau, the Peggs CDP has an area of 15.3 square miles (39.7 km^{2}), all land.

== Demographics ==
Historical population
Census	Pop.	Note	%±
2000	814		—
2010	813		−0.1%
2020	789		−3.0%
U.S. Decennial Census

=== 2020 census ===
As of the 2020 census, Peggs had a population of 789. The median age was 41.3 years. 23.2% of residents were under the age of 18 and 17.1% of residents were 65 years of age or older. For every 100 females there were 87.9 males, and for every 100 females age 18 and over there were 78.8 males age 18 and over.

0.0% of residents lived in urban areas, while 100.0% lived in rural areas.

There were 295 households in Peggs, of which 30.5% had children under the age of 18 living in them. Of all households, 59.7% were married-couple households, 19.7% were households with a male householder and no spouse or partner present, and 15.3% were households with a female householder and no spouse or partner present. About 24.1% of all households were made up of individuals and 10.8% had someone living alone who was 65 years of age or older.

There were 323 housing units, of which 8.7% were vacant. The homeowner vacancy rate was 1.8% and the rental vacancy rate was 12.5%.

Racial composition as of the 2020 census
Race	Number	Percent
White	395	50.1%
Black or African American	2	0.3%
American Indian and Alaska Native	298	37.8%
Asian	0	0.0%
Native Hawaiian and Other Pacific Islander	0	0.0%
Some other race	6	0.8%
Two or more races	88	11.2%
Hispanic or Latino (of any race)	24	3.0%

=== 2010 census ===
As of the 2010 United States census, Peggs had a population of 813.

=== 2000 census ===
As of the 2000 United States census, Peggs had a population of 814.

== Economy ==
There are three convenience stores and one post office in the small community. There is also a senior community center serving noon meals to senior citizens.

== Education ==
Much of Peggs CDP is in the Peggs Public School elementary school district. Portions are in the Locust Grove Public Schools school district for grades PK-12.

The Peggs school district currently has one elementary (Pre-K-8) school, with 9-12 grade either going to neighboring Tahlequah, Hulbert, or Locust Grove to high school.

== Notable people ==
- Audra Smoke-Conner (born 1968), Cherokee Nation tribal councilor (2003–2007)
