= Cherokee Village =

Cherokee Village may refer to:

- Cherokee Village, Arkansas, a city
- Cherokee Village, Tennessee, an unincorporated community

== See also ==
- Cherokee Heritage Center, a reconstructed Cherokee village in Tahlequah, Oklahoma
