= Melvina Shotpouch =

American politician

Cherokee Nation Tribal Councilor
- Incumbent
- Assumed office August 14, 2021
- Preceded by: Harley Buzzard
- Constituency: 10th district
- In office 1999–2007
- Succeeded by: Harley Buzzard
- Constituency: 5th district
- In office 1991–1995
- Succeeded by: Barbara Starr Scott

Personal details
- Citizenship: American; Cherokee Nation

Melvina Shotpouch is a Cherokee Nation politician who has served on the Cherokee Nation tribal council since 2021. She served three prior terms on the council from 1991 to 1995 and from 1999 to 2007.

== Biography ==
Melvina Shotpouch was first elected during the tenure of Wilma Mankiller in 1991 and served until 1995. She was re-elected in 1999 to a second term. Shotpouch was re-elected in 2003 alongside Linda Hughes O'Leary to represent the multi-member district 5 of the Cherokee Nation tribal council. She ran for re-election in 2007, but lost re-election to Harley Buzzard. She filed to run for the 10th district in 2013, but was disqualified from running for living 1000 feet outside the district. When Buzzard was term limited in 2021 Shotpouch filed to succeed them representing the 10th district. After a June general election, she advanced to a July runoff with Shaunda Handle-Davis. She won the runoff election with 58.8% of the vote and was sworn in on August 14, 2021.

== See also ==
- List of Native American politicians
- Native American women in politics
