= Miss Cherokee =

Cherokee annual cultural leadership title

Miss Cherokee (Cherokee: ᎠᎨᏳᏣ ᏣᎳᎩ, romanized: ageyutsa tsalagi) is an annual cultural leadership title awarded by the Cherokee Nation to a young woman of Cherokee descent. The role of Miss Cherokee includes acting as an ambassador for the Cherokee Nation, representing the tribe at various cultural, educational, and governmental events. The Miss Cherokee title is part of a larger effort to promote Cherokee culture, leadership, and community engagement among young tribal members.

== Overview ==
The Miss Cherokee competition is managed by the Cherokee Nation’s Education Services, specifically through its youth leadership programs. In event promotes Cherokee values and serves as a platform for participants to demonstrate their knowledge of Cherokee history, language, and traditions. Winners of the Miss Cherokee title have played a role in tribal outreach, particularly in advocating for the revitalization of the Cherokee language and educating the public about Cherokee history.

The Miss Cherokee competition is open to young women who are citizens of the Cherokee Nation and reside within the tribal reservation. To be eligible, contestants must be high school graduates between the ages of 18 and 22 and must not have previously held the title of Miss Cherokee. The competition evaluates candidates on their knowledge of Cherokee culture, leadership abilities, public speaking skills, and community involvement.

The titleholder serves a one-year term, during which she represents the Cherokee Nation at various events, including tribal meetings, community functions, and educational engagements. In addition to serving as a cultural ambassador, Miss Cherokee receives a scholarship to support her academic endeavors. The 2024 Miss Cherokee received a $6,000 scholarship, with the first and second runners-up receiving $3,000 and $2,000 scholarships, respectively.

Miss Cherokee's duties have historically included visiting important cultural and political sites, such as the White House, the Oklahoma State Capitol, and the National Museum of the American Indian. The titleholder also participates in Cherokee Nation community meetings across the country, advocating for cultural preservation and leadership.

Alongside Miss Cherokee, the Cherokee Nation also holds competitions for Junior Miss Cherokee and Little Cherokee Ambassadors. Junior Miss Cherokee, open to middle and high school students between the ages of 13 and 18, focuses on leadership and cultural knowledge among younger Cherokee citizens. Little Cherokee Ambassadors, open to children aged 4 to 12, are judged in age-appropriate categories and serve as cultural representatives in their communities.

== History ==
The origins of Miss Cherokee can be traced back to 1955, when Phyllis Osage, a student at Sequoyah Vocational School, was crowned as "Queen of the Cornstalk Shoot" during the Cherokee National Holiday. This early title was a precursor to the formal Miss Cherokee competition that developed in later years. In 1957, the title was changed to "Miss Cherokee Holiday," with Linda Burrows being the first to hold this new designation. The official title of "Miss Cherokee" was introduced in 1962, and Ramona Collier became the first to be crowned under this title. This period marked the beginning of a more formalized role for the titleholder beyond just holiday festivities.

In the early years, Miss Cherokee's attire was a traditional commercial beaded crown and buckskin dress. This changed in 1969 when Virginia Stroud introduced the tear dress, turkey feather cape, and copper crown, which became the new standard for the title. The tear dress, though not a traditional garment from the 1800s, represents a utilitarian style reminiscent of Cherokee working women's attire, according to Cherokee National Treasure Tonia Weavel.

During the 1980s and 1990s, the competition began to incorporate more mainstream pageant elements, including evening wear and business attire. This shift continued until former Miss Cherokee Nancy Scott (1977 to 1978) became the coordinator of the event in 2000. Under her leadership, the competition evolved into the Miss Cherokee Leadership Competition, requiring contestants to present a platform addressing issues affecting the Cherokee community. Platforms have included environmental concerns, education, diabetes awareness, cultural preservation, language preservation, and women's empowerment.

The competition has also undergone changes in eligibility requirements and event formats. Former Miss Cherokee Janelle Adair (1999 to 2000) noted that the blood quantum rule, requiring contestants to be at least one-fourth Cherokee, was in place during her tenure. She also mentioned the removal of the Lord's Prayer in sign language and the evening wear category. Additionally, the rise of social media has introduced new challenges for contemporary contestants.

=== Crown ===
The Miss Cherokee crown has undergone numerous transformations, reflecting both cultural symbolism and the evolving artistry of Cherokee craftsmen. Initially, the crown was a simple leather strap adorned with a feather. However, by the 1960s, the design evolved into a fully beaded crown. Throughout the 1970s and 1980s, Cherokee artist Willard Stone handcrafted a copper crown, which included seven turkey feathers symbolizing the seven Cherokee clans. The crown's centerpiece was inscribed with the Cherokee seal and star, representing the unity and cultural heritage of the Cherokee Nation. Turkey footprints were incorporated into the sides of the crown, symbolizing young Cherokee maidens striving toward the "golden Cherokee hills" in their pursuit of the Miss Cherokee title.

In 1992, the crown was redesigned by Cherokee artist Bill Glass Sr., who added a pearl shell Cherokee star to the front of the crown, while maintaining the presence of feathers. That same year, Glass's daughter, Geri Gayle Glass, won the Miss Cherokee title and wore the newly updated crown.

In 2003, Cherokee artist Demos Glass, the grandson of Bill Glass Sr., created two new crowns. The first, used until 2013, incorporated sterling silver and pink mussel shell along with copper. Demos sought to maintain elements of Stone's original design while introducing his own artistic touches. His second crown, still in use today, is made entirely of copper and features taller, curved feathers to give the crown a distinct "southeast feel." Both crowns feature seven feathers and the Cherokee star, maintaining continuity with past designs while reflecting the evolving artistry of Cherokee metalsmiths.

== List of winners ==
- Phyllis Osage (1955)
- Stella Coon (1956)
- Linda Burros Priest (1957)
- Dana Reno Temple (1958)
- Carol Cochran (1959)
- Gloria Mitchell Cooksey (1960)
- Barbara Price Masters (1961)
- Ramona Collier Gallagher (1962)
- Mary Ketcher (1963)
- Cynthia Ann Orcutt (1964)
- Jeloria Owens Jensen (1965)
- Judy Satterfield (1966)
- Carol Chopper Hamby (1967)
- Janice Sue Coon (1968)
- Virginia Stroud (1969)
- Carol Holt McKee (1970)
- Deborah Daugherty (1971)
- Brenda Allen Stone (1972)
- Waleah Baker Turner (1973)
- Shirley Owl Dawson (1974)
- Bobbie Scott Smith (1975)
- Cynthia Blackfox (1976)
- Nancy Scott (1977)
- Brenda Krause (1978)
- Lisa Phillips (1979)
- Mary Kay Harshaw Henderson (1980, 1981)
- Regina Christie Bell (1982)
- Esther Raper Russell (1983)
- Jennie Terrapin (1984)
- Teresa Shoemaker Tackett (1985)
- Julie Hill Santomero (1986)
- Lisa Trice Turtle (1986)
- Audra Smoke-Conner (1988)
- Carla Joyln Carey Rose (1989)
- Tonnette Mouse Hummingbird (1990)
- Deborah Reed (1991)
- Geri Gayle Pierce (1992)
- Walisi Robinson Bowen (1993)
- Jessica Houston (1994)
- Julie Deerinwater (1995)
- Lindsey Houston (1996)
- Christie Squichie (1997)
- Tonya Still (1998)
- Janelle Adair (1999)
- Jamie Standingwater (2000)
- Amanda Carey (2001)
- Kristen Smith-Snell (2002)
- Raven Bruner (2003)
- Ashley Downing (2004)
- LeShawna Fields (2005)
- Michelle Lynn Locust (2006)
- Lindsay Glass (2007)
- Feather Smith (2008)
- Danielle Culp (2009)
- Sidney Kimble (2011)
- Christy Kingfisher (2012)
- Sunday Plumb (2014)
- Ja-Li-Si Pittman (2015)
- Sky Wildcat (2016)
- Madison Whitekiller (2017)
- Whitney Roach (2018)
- Meekah Roy (2019)
- Chelbie Turtle (2021)
- Lauryn Fields (2022)
- Keeleigh Sanders (2023)
- Ella Mounce (2024)
