= Sasha Blackfox-Qualls =

American politician

Cherokee Nation Tribal Councilor for the 1st district
- Incumbent
- Assumed office August 14, 2023
- Preceded by: Rex Jordan

Member of the Hulbert Public Schools Board of Education
- Incumbent
- Assumed office 2019

Personal details
- Citizenship: American; Cherokee Nation

Sasha Blackfox-Qualls is a Cherokee Nation politician who has served on the Cherokee Nation tribal council since 2023.

== Education and early career ==
Blackfox-Qualls graduated from Southwestern Oklahoma State University with a bachelor's degree in nursing. Afterward she worked as a registered nurse at the W.W. Hastings Hospital in Tahlequah, Oklahoma.

== Political career ==
Blackfox-Qualls ran unopposed for the Hulbert Public Schools Board of Education in 2019 and served as the board's vice-president. She ran in the 2023 Cherokee Nation tribal council elections against Dale Lee Glory, Trae Ratliff, and Brian Jackson. In June, she advanced to a runoff alongside Glory. She won the runoff with 56% of the vote. She was sworn in on August 14, 2023, succeeding Rex Jordan.

== See also ==
- List of Native American politicians
- Native American women in politics
