= Joe Deere =

Cherokee Nation politician

Cherokee Nation Tribal Councilor for the 13th district
- Incumbent
- Assumed office August 14, 2019
- Preceded by: Buel Anglen

Joe Deere is a Cherokee Nation politician who has served on the Cherokee Nation tribal council representing the 13th district since 2019.

== Cherokee Nation tribal council ==
Deere first ran for the Cherokee Nation tribal council in 2011 against Lee R. Keener Jr.; he lost the race. Deere filed again in 2019, this time against district 13 incumbent Buel Anglen. Deere challenged Anglen's candidacy under the 1999 Cherokee Nation Constitution's term limit provisions and the Cherokee Nation Election Commission disqualified Anglen from running. The Cherokee Nation Supreme Court affirmed the Election Commissions decision. With Anglen disqualified, Deere was unopposed in the 2019 election. The court dismissed a later appeal by Anglen for a new election. He was sworn on August 15, 2019. He is running for re-election in the 2023 Cherokee Nation tribal council elections.
