= Barbara Starr Scott =

American politician (1939-2020)

Cherokee Nation Tribal Councilor for the 5th district
- In office 1995–1999
- Preceded by: Melvina Shotpouch
- Succeeded by: Melvina Shotpouch
- In office 1983–1987

Personal details
- Born: Barbara Ann Starr; May 19, 1939 Claremore, Oklahoma, U.S.
- Died: December 6, 2020 (aged 81)
- Citizenship: Cherokee Nation; United States
- Children: 1
- Education: Haskell Indian Junior College; Tulsa Junior College

Barbara Ann Starr Scott (May 19, 1939 – December 6, 2020) was a Cherokee politician who served on the Cherokee Nation tribal council for district 5 from 1983 to 1987 and 1995 to 1999.

== Life ==
Starr Scott was born on May 19, 1939, in Claremore, Oklahoma, to Lacy Fallingpot-Starr and Buelah Benton Hendren Fallingpot-Starr. She was the second of five children and spent her early years in Eucha. In 1952, the construction of Lake Eucha prompted her family to relocate to Rattlesnake Hollow. Starr Scott graduated from Jay High School in 1957. She pursued further education at Haskell Indian Junior College and Tulsa Junior College.

Starr Scott initially worked as a hairdresser, running her own business out of her home in Bixby, Oklahoma, for many years. Later, she transitioned into healthcare, becoming a dental assistant for the Indian Health Service. In addition to her career in healthcare, Starr Scott and her husband, Arthur Calvin Scott, whom she married on November 13, 1958, started a family business, the "Lil Indian Smoke Shop," in Jay, Oklahoma. They ran the shop alongside their son, Calvin Jay, and his wife, Rhonda.

Starr Scott's political involvement began with her election to the Cherokee Nation tribal council. She represented the multi-member district 5 (Delaware and Ottawa counties) from 1983 to 1987 and 1995 to 1999. In 1987, Starr Scott ran for deputy chief of Cherokee Nation, placing second to incumbent John Letcher 4,763 votes to 3,906. During her time on the council, she chaired the health committee, co-chaired the executive and finance committee, and contributed to the education, language, rules, and community development committees. She advocated for improving healthcare services for Cherokee Nation citizens. In 1997, Starr Scott was part of a Federal Bureau of Investigation investigation into illegal wiretapping, where she was asked to identify her voice in recordings tied to potential wiretap violations. The investigation focused on wiretapping among tribal officials rather than the content of the conversations. At the 1999 Cherokee Nation constitutional convention, Starr Scott supported a proposal to create two at-large districts on the tribal council, which became the successful "Starr-Scott proposal" that was included in the 1999 Cherokee Nation constitution.

Starr Scott was a collector of Native American jewelry. She died on December 6, 2020, at the age of 81.

== See also ==
- List of Native American politicians
- Native American women in politics
