= Julia Coates =

American politician

Cherokee Nation Tribal Councilor for the at-large district
- Incumbent
- Assumed office August 14, 2019
- Preceded by: Wanda Hatfield
- In office August 14, 2007 – August 14, 2015
- Preceded by: Taylor Keen
- Succeeded by: Wanda Hatfield

Personal details
- Born: Pryor, Oklahoma
- Education: San Francisco State University (B.A.); University of New Mexico (M.A., PhD)

Julia Coates is a Cherokee Nation politician serving as one of the two at-large Cherokee Nation tribal councilors since 2019. She was one of the first elected at-large tribal councilors in 2007 and served until term limited in 2015. (Note: Cherokee Nation term limits only limit the number of consecutive terms, allowing former councilors to run again after waiting out a term.)

== Early life and education ==
Julia Coates was born in Pryor, Oklahoma to Glen Coats and Janis Essex Coates Rea. She double majored at San Francisco State University in anthropology and creative writing, earned a master's of arts and PhD in American Studies from University of New Mexico before doing a post-doctoral fellowship at the University of California. She also was an assistant professor of Native American studies at University of California Davis.

== 1999 Cherokee Nation constitutional convention ==
Coates was a delegate to the 1999 Cherokee Nation constitutional convention. The night before the convention, Coates organized a meeting of the fourteen off-reservation delegates to strategize creating off-reservation representation during the convention. Coates advocated during the convention for at-large representation by saying "Our land base is minimal ... but in some sense our Nation exists from coast to coast and border to border because our Nation exists in our people, our citizens and our citizens are everywhere." Coates's view was opposed during the convention by David Cornsilk who argued "Cherokee Nation is a real place, that it is here. That it is within the exterior boundaries of the Cherokee Nation as described in our treaties, and that the focus of the people who live outside the Cherokee Nation should be to strengthen the Nation, the place here." Other delegates advocated for allowing off-reservation citizens to choose a district inside the Cherokee Nation to vote. Tribal Council member Barbara Starr Scott threw her support behind a proposal to create two at-large districts on the tribal council, which became the successful "Starr-Scott proposal" that was included in the 1999 Cherokee Nation constitution.

== Cherokee Nation tribal council ==
Coates first ran for the Cherokee Nation tribal council in 2007 against incumbent, and first, (unelected) at-large councilor Taylor Keen. She won the general election with 74% of the vote. She was sworn on August 14, 2007. During her first term, Coates opposed efforts to eliminate absentee voting in Cherokee Nation elections. In 2011, Coates ran for re-election and, while her candidacy was challenged, the Cherokee Nation Election Commission found her eligible to run and the Cherokee Nation Supreme Court affirmed the decision. Coates won re-election over John Cornsilk. She was sworn in for her second term on August 14, 2011. She was succeeded by Wanda Hatfield.

== 2015 deputy chief campaign ==
In 2015, Coates was term limited from running for the tribal council again; she filed to run for the office of deputy chief that year. The Cherokee Nation election commission ruled on March 20 that Coates was ineligible to run for the office because she was not domiciled within the Cherokee Nation for 270 days prior to the election and had in fact lived in Los Angeles part of that time. Her lawyer, Chad Smith promised to appeal. The Cherokee Nation Supreme Court issued a verbal ruling on April 13 upholding the election commission's decision, and released their written a week later. The court considered crucial video evidence of Coates saying "I live in Los Angeles."

== Return to tribal council ==
In 2019, Coates ran for her old at-large seat against now-incumbent Wanda Hatfield. Coates advanced to a runoff election with Johnny Jack Kidwelll; Hatfield was disqualified before the election for sending checks worth $500 to the Mount Hood Cherokees of Salem, Oregon, and the San Diego Cherokee Community. Coates won the runoff with 56% of the vote. She was sworn in for her third term on August 14, 2019. She ran for re-election in the 2023 Cherokee Nation tribal council elections.

== See also ==
- List of Native American politicians
- Native American women in politics
