= Dora Patzkowski =

Cherokee Nation politician

Cherokee Nation Tribal Councilor for the 12th district
- Incumbent
- Assumed office August 14, 2019
- Preceded by: Dick Lay

Dora Patzkowski is a Cherokee Nation politician who has served as the Cherokee Nation tribal councilor for the 12th district since 2019.

== Cherokee Nation tribal council ==
Patzkowski first ran for the Cherokee Nation's 12th tribal council district in 2015, against incumbent Dick Lay. Lay won re-election with 61% of the vote. Lay was term limited in 2019, and Patzkowski ran again, this time against Phyllis Lay, Todd Branstetter, and Don Scott. She advanced to the runoff alongside Phyllis Lay, the retiring incumbent's wife. She won the runoff with 63% of the vote. She was sworn in on August 14, 2019. She is running for re-election in the 2023 Cherokee Nation tribal council elections. She won the 2023 election with 81% of the vote against Challenger Crystal st. John.

== See also ==
- List of Native American politicians
- Native American women in politics
