= Daryl Legg =

Cherokee Nation politician

Cherokee Nation Tribal Councilor for the 6th district
- Incumbent
- Assumed office August 14, 2019
- Preceded by: Bryan Warner

Sallisaw, Oklahoma Ward 4 Commissioner
- In office 2015 – May 2018
- Preceded by: Vicki Sawney
- Succeeded by: Shannon Vann

Personal details
- Education: Northeastern State University

Daryl Legg is a Cherokee Nation politician who has served as the member of the Cherokee Nation tribal council for the 6th district since 2019.

== Early life, education, and career ==
Legg served three prison sentences for drug possession (two in Arkansas and one in Oklahoma) before attending classes with the Cherokee Nation re-entry program, which assists formerly incarcerated Cherokee Nation citizens with finding jobs, housing, and school after release. He later graduated from Northeastern State University in 2006. After graduation, he started working with the Cherokee Nation and, by 2009, became a director in the Cherokee Nation vocational education program. From 2013 to 2019, Legg worked as the Cherokee Nation's Career Services Coming Home Re-entry Program director. In 2014, he was named a "Champion of Change" by the Obama administration for going from being sentenced three times for drug possession, to running a re-entry program for Native Americans. He was elected in Sallisaw, Oklahoma as the Ward 4 commissioner and served between 2015 and May 2018.

== Cherokee Nation tribal council ==
Legg ran for the Cherokee Nation's 6th district seat being vacated by Bryan Warner in 2019; he faced Ron Goff and Gary Trad Lattimore in the general election. He won the general election and avoided a runoff with 56% of the vote. He was sworn on August 15, 2019. Legg said of his election to the tribal council "I feel like I carry a big torch for those that are also convicted felons. My story is out there. If people can see somebody like me make it, it gives them hope." He ran for re-election in the 2023 Cherokee Nation tribal council elections and was re-elected with 76% of the vote.
