= Rex Jordan =

Cherokee Nation politician

Cherokee Nation Tribal Councilor for the 1st district
- In office August 14, 2015 – August 14, 2023
- Preceded by: Tina Glory-Jordan
- Succeeded by: Sasha Blackfox-Qualls

Personal details
- Spouse: Tina Glory-Jordan
- Education: Oklahoma State University

Rex Jordan is a Cherokee Nation politician who served on the Cherokee Nation tribal council between 2015 and 2023.

== Education and career ==
Rex Jordan graduated from Hulbert High School and later earned a bachelor's and master's degree in agricultural education from Oklahoma State University. He worked for the Housing Authority of the Cherokee Nation for 20 years. He also raises cattle on his family farm.

== Cherokee Nation tribal council ==
Jordan ran for the Cherokee Nation's 1st district tribal council seat being vacated by his wife, Tina Glory-Jordan, in 2015. He faced Ryan Sierra in the general election. He won the election with 63% of the vote and was inaugurated on August 14, 2015. In 2019, he ran for re-election in a rematch against Ryan Sierra, winning with 57% of the vote. He was sworn in for his second term on August 14, 2019. He was term limited in 2023.

== Personal life ==
He is married to former Cherokee Nation tribal councilor Tina Glory Jordan.
