= Cherokee National Youth Choir =

Youth choir

The Cherokee National Youth Choir was created in part by Chad "Corntassel" Smith, a former Principal Chief of the Cherokee Nation. It consists of youth of Cherokee descent who sing gospel music in the Cherokee language. The directors are Mary Kay Henderson and Kathy Sierra. The choir has sung at various venues around the United States, including for former president George W. Bush, at Ground Zero in New York City, and alongside Dolly Parton at her amusement park, Dollywood. They have won numerous awards, including a Nammy (the Native American Music Award), and they release a new gospel CD each year.
