= Kendra McGeady =

Cherokee politician and transportation executive

Cherokee Nation Tribal Councilor for the 11th district
- Incumbent
- Assumed office September 16, 2024
- Preceded by: Victoria Vazquez

Personal details
- Born: Oklahoma, U.S.
- Citizenship: Cherokee Nation; United States

Kendra Sue McGeady is a Cherokee politician and transportation executive serving as a Cherokee Nation tribal councilor for District 11 since 2024.

== Life ==
McGeady was born and raised in Oklahoma, with her Cherokee lineage tracing back through her mother, Jo Montana, and maternal grandmother. She is a citizen of Cherokee Nation.

McGeady began her career in public transportation, eventually becoming the director of Pelivan Transit and the Northeastern Tribal Transit Consortium in March 2016. In this role, she oversees operations across a 4,466 square mile service area, managing 46 employees and 55 transit vehicles. Under her leadership, Pelivan has secured over $2.5 million in discretionary grants to enhance and innovate their operations, with more than $600,000 dedicated specifically to tribal transit. In early 2023, McGeady was appointed chair of the regional South West Transit Authority (SWTA) after serving as vice chair. SWTA represents over 500 transit systems across eight states, providing education, communication, and advocacy for transit providers. As board president, McGeady's responsibilities include overseeing SWTA finances and budget, executing contracts, evaluating staff, and advocating for public and tribal transit legislation. McGeady's work focuses on improving transportation access for both Native and non-Native individuals in rural areas. She has been particularly active in addressing the challenges faced by transit systems during and after the COVID-19 pandemic. Her goals include securing dedicated capital funding for tribal providers and reducing bureaucratic obstacles for rural transit operations. McGeady held positions on the Cherokee Nation gaming commission and the Cherokee Phoenix editorial board.

On August 29, 2024, the Cherokee Nation Tribal Council rules committee selected McGeady to represent District 11, filling the vacancy left by Victoria Vazquez's resignation. She received 14 committee votes in favor, with two abstentions. Her selection was subject to a public comment period and official confirmation at the Tribal Council meeting on September 16, 2024. McGeady is serving as the interim Tribal Councilor for District 11 until the midterm elections in 2024. During her address to the council, McGeady outlined her priorities, which included addressing housing shortages in District 11, infrastructure development, and cultural preservation, particularly through the Anna Mitchell Cultural and Welcome Center.

McGeady is from Vinita, Oklahoma.

== See also ==
- List of Native American politicians
- Native American women in politics
