= Ashley Grant =

Cherokee Nation Tribal Councilor for the 5th district
- Incumbent
- Assumed office August 14, 2025
- Preceded by: E. O. Smith

Personal details
- Born: 1981 or 1982 (age 44–45)
- Citizenship: Cherokee Nation; United States
- Education: Oklahoma State University

Ashley L. Grant (born c. 1982) is an American healthcare professional and politician serving as the Cherokee Nation Tribal Councilor for District 5. A former employee of Cherokee Nation Health, she was elected to the council on June 7, 2025, winning the general election with over 51 percent of the vote and avoiding a runoff. She was sworn into her first four-year term on August 14, 2025. Her policy priorities include expanding healthcare access and housing rehabilitation for Cherokee citizens, protecting tribal sovereignty, and promoting cultural and language initiatives.

== Early life and education ==
Grant was born c. 1982 and grew up in Tahlequah, Oklahoma. Throughout her life, she received support from the Cherokee Nation, including educational scholarships and healthcare services. Grant earned a doctoral degree in health care administration from Oklahoma State University.

== Career ==
Grant is a healthcare professional who previously worked for Cherokee Nation Health. As of 2025, she currently works as a consultant for Oracle Health. Grant has stated that she was taught the values of hard work and perseverance by her parents and credits a mentor, Dr. Jones, with reinforcing the importance of integrity.

=== Cherokee Nation Tribal Council ===
==== 2025 Election ====
Grant stated she was motivated to run for the District 5 Cherokee Nation Tribal Council seat as a way to give back. Another motivating factor was her desire to address a feeling of disconnect from the tribal government that some Cherokee citizens in her district had expressed.

In the June 7, 2025, general election, Grant faced two opponents, Frank Whitlock and Charles Wilkes. She won the election with 158 votes, or 51.13 percent of the total, which was enough to meet the "50 percent plus one vote" threshold required to avoid a runoff. Grant replaced the incumbent councilor, E. O. Smith, who was term-limited.

Her district, District 5, was changed during the 2024 redistricting and now represents a portion of Tulsa County within the Cherokee Nation Reservation.

==== Tenure ====
Grant was sworn into office for her first four-year term on August 14, 2025. She serves on the 17-member Tribal Council.

Upon taking office, Grant stated her priorities included fostering collaboration within the council and increasing awareness of and access to Cherokee Nation programs and services. Her policy goals include expanding healthcare access, particularly through supporting a new clinic in North Tulsa, and advocating for resources to address housing rehabilitation. Grant also supports working across political lines to protect tribal sovereignty and Native rights. She has expressed a commitment to expanding cultural initiatives, such as Cherokee language programs and immersion schools.

== See also ==
- List of Native American politicians
- Native American women in politics
