= Secretary of State of the Cherokee Nation =

Cabinet-level government position

Secretary of State of Cherokee Nation
- Incumbent; Shella Bowlin since 2023
- Department of State
- Type: Secretary of State
- Appointer: Principal Chief of the Cherokee Nation
- Formation: 2003

The secretary of state of the Cherokee Nation is a cabinet-level position within the executive branch of the Cherokee Nation government. This role is appointed by the Principal Chief and confirmed by the Tribal Council.

== History ==
The position of Secretary of State was established in the Cherokee Nation Constitution, which was drafted in 1999 and ratified in 2003. Article VI, Section 12 of the Constitution specifically mentions the Secretary of State as one of the three original cabinet positions, along with the Treasurer and Secretary of Natural Resources. The Secretary of State is appointed by the Principal Chief and must be confirmed by the Tribal Council. As a cabinet member, the Secretary of State serves at the discretion of the Principal Chief.

=== Duties ===
The Secretary of State is one of seven cabinet positions within the Cherokee Nation's executive branch. The Secretary of State's office includes two Deputy Secretary positions:

- Deputy Secretary of State for Policy and Legislation: This role focuses on working with the Council of the Cherokee Nation and developing policies and legislative initiatives.
- Deputy Secretary of State for Community Engagement: This position concentrates on community engagement and grassroots organizing to empower Cherokee citizens.

As of August 2023, these Deputy Secretary roles were filled by Taralee Montgomery and Canaan Duncan, respectively.

== Officeholders ==
- Melanie Knight
- Charles Head (2012–2013)
- Chuck Hoskin Jr. (2013–2019)
- Tina Glory-Jordan (2019–2023)
- Shella Bowlin (2023–present)
