= Cherokee National Holiday =

Annual event in Tahlequah, Oklahoma, US

Coordinates: 35.915°N 94.970°W

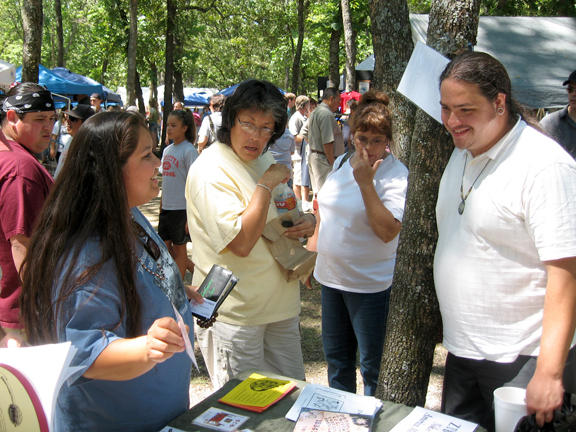
Arts and crafts booths on the Cherokee Heritage Center grounds, Cherokee National Holiday, 2007

The Cherokee National Holiday is an annual event held each Labor Day weekend in Tahlequah, Oklahoma. The event celebrates the September 6, 1839 signing of the Constitution of the Cherokee Nation in Oklahoma after the Trail of Tears Indian removal ended.

== Origins and activities ==
Originally begun in 1953, the event has grown into one of the largest festivals in Oklahoma, attracting in excess of 70,000 attendees coming from all over the United States. Many attendees are also tribal members of the "Five Civilized Tribes" (the Cherokee, and also the Chickasaws, the Choctaws, Creeks, and Seminoles). Others who routinely attend the event are the Eastern Band of Cherokee Indians located in western North Carolina and also the United Keetowah Band which, like the Cherokee Nation, are headquartered in Tahlequah.

The holiday hosts many different cultural and artistic events such as a two-night intertribal pow wow, stickball, Cherokee marbles, horseshoes and cornstalk shoot tournaments, softball tournaments, rodeos, car and art shows, gospel singings, the annual Miss Cherokee pageant, the Cherokee National Holiday parade, and the annual "State of the Nation" address by the Principal Chief of the Cherokee Nation.

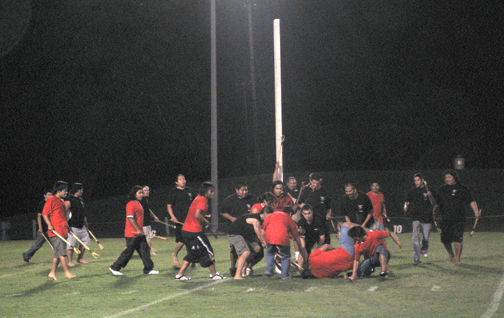
Cherokee National Holiday stickball match on the grounds of Sequoyah High School, Tahlequah, Oklahoma

== Celebration themes ==
Each year a committee chooses a new theme for the annual celebration. Some recent themes have included:

- Building our Nation, Strengthening our Sovereignty - (71st Annual) 2023
- Forging a Legacy: Seven Decades of Cherokee Fellowship - (70th Annual) 2022
- Cultivating Our Culture Language. Literacy. Lifeways. - (69th Annual) 2021
- We the People of the Cherokee Nation: Celebrating Tribal Sovereignty - (68th Annual) 2020
- Rising Together - (67th Annual) 2019
- Family: A bridge to the future, a link to the past - (66th Annual) 2018
- Water is Sacred - (65th Annual) 2017
- Stewards of Our Land - (64th Annual) 2016
- Reunion - (63rd Annual) 2015
- Homes. Health. Hope. - (62nd Annual) 2014
- Homes. Health. Hope. – (61st Annual) 2013
- From One Fire to a Proud Future – (60th Annual) 2012
- Jobs, Language and Community – (59th Annual) 2011
- Happy, Healthy People – (58th Annual) 2010
- Learn from all that I observe – (57th Annual) 2009
- Planting the Seed Corn For Our Children's Future – (56th Annual) 2008
- The Cherokee Nation Continues in Full Force and Effect – (54th Annual) 2006
- Celebrating the State of Sequoyah – (53rd Annual) 2005
- The Spirit of the Trail – (52nd Annual) 2004
- The Strength of Our Nation – (51st Annual) 2003
- Building One Fire – (50th Annual) 2002
- Celebrating The Seven Clans – (49th Annual) 2001

== Covid-19 ==
Due to COVID-19 pandemic, the 68th Annual Cherokee National Holiday was a "virtual holiday." Many events still took place and spectators were able to watch online to see the Chief's State of the Nation address, Cherokee art show, Miss Cherokee competition, as well as, demonstrations of traditional games. However, events such as the annual parade, fishing derby, powwow, softball tournament, arts and crafts, food markets and vendors were canceled and initially set to resume in 2021. However, due to the pandemic continuing into 2021, the 69th Annual Cherokee National Holiday was announced as a "hybrid" celebration featuring virtual and smaller scale in-person events, with the expected return to normal delayed until 2022. After two years of purely virtual participation the 70th annual celebration was held in-person. Officials stated that virtual participation would still be provided for some elements of the holiday due to COVID concerns.

== See also ==
- Cherokee Heritage Center
- Cherokee language
- Park Hill, Oklahoma
