= Wanda Hatfield =

Cherokee educator and politician

Cherokee Nation Tribal Councilor for the at-large district
- In office August 14, 2015 – August 13, 2019
- Preceded by: Julia Coates
- Succeeded by: Julia Coates

Personal details
- Born: Wanda Claphan Tahlequah, Oklahoma, U.S.
- Citizenship: Cherokee Nation; United States
- Children: 1
- Education: University of Oklahoma

Wanda Hatfield (née Claphan) is a Cherokee educator and politician who served as an At-Large Tribal Councilor for the Cherokee Nation from 2015 to 2019.

== Career ==
Wanda Hatfield was born at WW Hastings Hospital in Tahlequah, Oklahoma, and grew up in the Cherry Tree Community in Stilwell, Oklahoma. She is the daughter of the Jack Claphan and Carolyn Doublehead Claphan. Her great-great-grandfather, Rabbit Bunch, served as the Cherokee Nation assistant principal chief from 1880 to 1887. Hatfield graduated from Stilwell High School and earned a B.S. in education from the University of Oklahoma. Hatfield married Roger Hatfield and they had one daughter.

For 28 years, Hatfield taught in the Shawnee and Mid-Del School Districts. In 2015, Hatfield ran for the at-large seat of the Council of the Cherokee Nation. She finished first ahead of Betsy Swimmer and Shane Jett. Hatfield received 1,057 votes, Swimmer 770 votes, and Jett 717 votes. She assumed the position on August 14, 2015. She succeeded Julia Coates who was term-limited. As an At-Large councilor, Hatfield represented Cherokee Nation citizens living outside the tribe's 14-county jurisdiction in northeastern Oklahoma.

During her term, Hatfield was involved in sponsoring legislation, with records showing she sponsored 59 pieces of legislation during her time on the council. She ran for re-election in 2019, seeking to retain her At-Large seat. However, her campaign faced controversy when she was disqualified by the Cherokee Nation Election Commission on April 18, 2019. The disqualification came after a hearing and was related to Hatfield sending checks worth $500 to Cherokee communities in Oregon and California. Following her disqualification, Coates, who had previously held the At-Large seat, ran for the position again and won, returning to the Tribal Council in August 2019.

== See also ==
- List of Native American politicians
- Native American women in politics
