= Shella Bowlin =

Cherokee government official

Cherokee Nation Secretary of State
- Incumbent
- Assumed office September 1, 2023
- Appointed by: Chuck Hoskin Jr.
- Preceded by: Tina Glory-Jordan

Personal details
- Education: Oklahoma State University–Stillwater; Indiana University Bloomington

Shella Bowlin is a Cherokee government official and business executive serving as the secretary of state of the Cherokee Nation since 2023.

== Life ==
Bowlin was raised in Bowlin Spring in Craig County, Oklahoma where her great-grandfather had settled. She is a descendant of a Cherokee Freedman. She holds a Bachelor of Science in industrial engineering and management from Oklahoma State University. Bowlin began her career as an engineer in the airline industry. She earned a Master of Business Administration from Kelley School of Business at Indiana University Bloomington.

In 2004, Bowlin joined Cherokee Nation Businesses. By 2020, she was the senior director of strategy and analytics for, overseeing long-term growth planning. During her tenure, she mitigated the COVID-19 pandemic's impact on gaming, one of the tribe’s main business sectors. Bowlin advocated for greater representation of women in management roles, noting the "broken rung" that limits women’s advancement in leadership positions.

In 2023, Bowlin was appointed by principal chief Chuck Hoskin Jr. as the secretary of state of the Cherokee Nation, succeeding Tina Glory-Jordan. She joined the three-person Task Force on Cherokee Nation Freedmen participation in 2024 to provide recommendations to ensure equal access to tribal services including healthcare, education, housing, and workforce training.

== See also ==
- List of Native American politicians
- Native American women in politics
