= Cherokee Heritage Center =

Non-profit historical society and museum in Park Hill, Oklahoma

Coordinates: 35°52′02″N 94°57′20″W

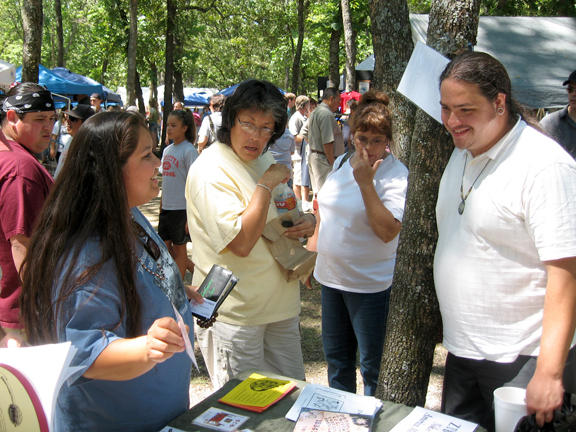
Arts and crafts booths on the Cherokee Heritage Center grounds, Cherokee National Holiday, 2007

The Cherokee Heritage Center (Cherokee: Ꮳꮃꭹ Ꮷꮎꮣꮄꮕꮣ Ꭰᏸꮅ, romanized: Tsalagi Tsunadalenvda Ayeli) is a non-profit historical society and museum campus that seeks to preserve the historical and cultural artifacts, language, and traditional crafts of the Cherokee. The Heritage Center also hosts the central genealogy database and genealogy research center for the Cherokee People. The Heritage Center is located on the site of the mid-19th century Cherokee Seminary building in Park Hill, Oklahoma, a suburb of Tahlequah, and was constructed near the old structure. It is a unit of the Cherokee National Historical Society (Note: Cherokee: ᏣᎳᎩ ᏗᎦᏓᎴᏅᎲᎢ ᎬᎾᏕᎾ ᎠᏂᏃᎮᏍᎩ ᎤᎾᏙᏢᎯ, romanized: tsalagi digadalenvhvi gvnadena aninohesgi unadotlvhi) and is sponsored by the Cherokee Nation, the United Keetoowah Band of Cherokee Indians, and other area tribes. The center was originally known as Tsa-La-Gi but is now known as the Cherokee Heritage Center.

== Collections ==
The Cherokee Heritage Center hosts an extensive collection of historic documents, art, cultural objects, and relics from the 1830s march along the Trail of Tears. The Cherokee National Museum exhibit hosts an extensive collection of ancient artifacts from the Cherokee culture from ancient to modern times.

The Ancient Village, located on the grounds of the Cherokee Heritage Center, is a complete reproduction of a mid-18th century Cherokee Township as it would have been encountered by European explorers or settlers. A guided tour of the village includes stops in a traditionally constructed, seven-sided council house and a brush arbor as well as demonstrations of traditional crafts, hunting techniques, religious and cultural practices. Visitors are invited to try their hand at using a blowgun and playing stickball during the tour.

Also on the grounds is the Adams Corner Rural Village which depicts a typical Cherokee settlement after removal to Indian Territory.

== History of the Cherokee Heritage Center ==
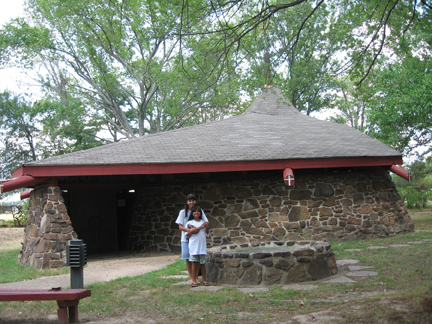
Ho-Chee-Nee Chapel on the grounds of the Cherokee Heritage Center

=== Founding ===
Retired Army Colonel Marty Hagerstrand founded the Cherokee Heritage Center in 1962, having begun research in Cherokee history and culture in the late 1950s. Joining him in this endeavor was Principal Chief of the Cherokee Nation William Wayne Keeler.

The project combined goals of economic development and cultural preservation. The first newspaper in Oklahoma was the Cherokee Advocate, published September 26, 1844.

The first four years the Heritage Center was in the basement of Hagerstrand's home. In 1966, a formal design contract was negotiated with the architectural-engineering firm of Hudgins, Thompson, Ball, and Associates (of Tulsa, Oklahoma), which included a provision that Charles "Chief" Boyd would be the designer of the project. Boyd and his family then moved to Tulsa from Colorado and joined the firm.

Resource materials on Cherokee culture and history were available in the Cherokee Collection at the library of the local college – Northeastern State University (NSU). There was also a collection of papers and pamphlets at the Gilcrease Institute in Tulsa and pertinent reports of the Bureau of American Ethnology of the Smithsonian Institution. Jack Frederick Kilpatrick, a scholar of Cherokee history and professor of music at Southern Methodist University, advised on planning and construction of the village. Data and descriptions developed by Drs. Kneberg and Lewis at the University of Tennessee were also helpful. Boyd researched Cherokee structures and independently developed a design for the village that aligned with earlier concepts from Hagerstrand and Kilpatrick.

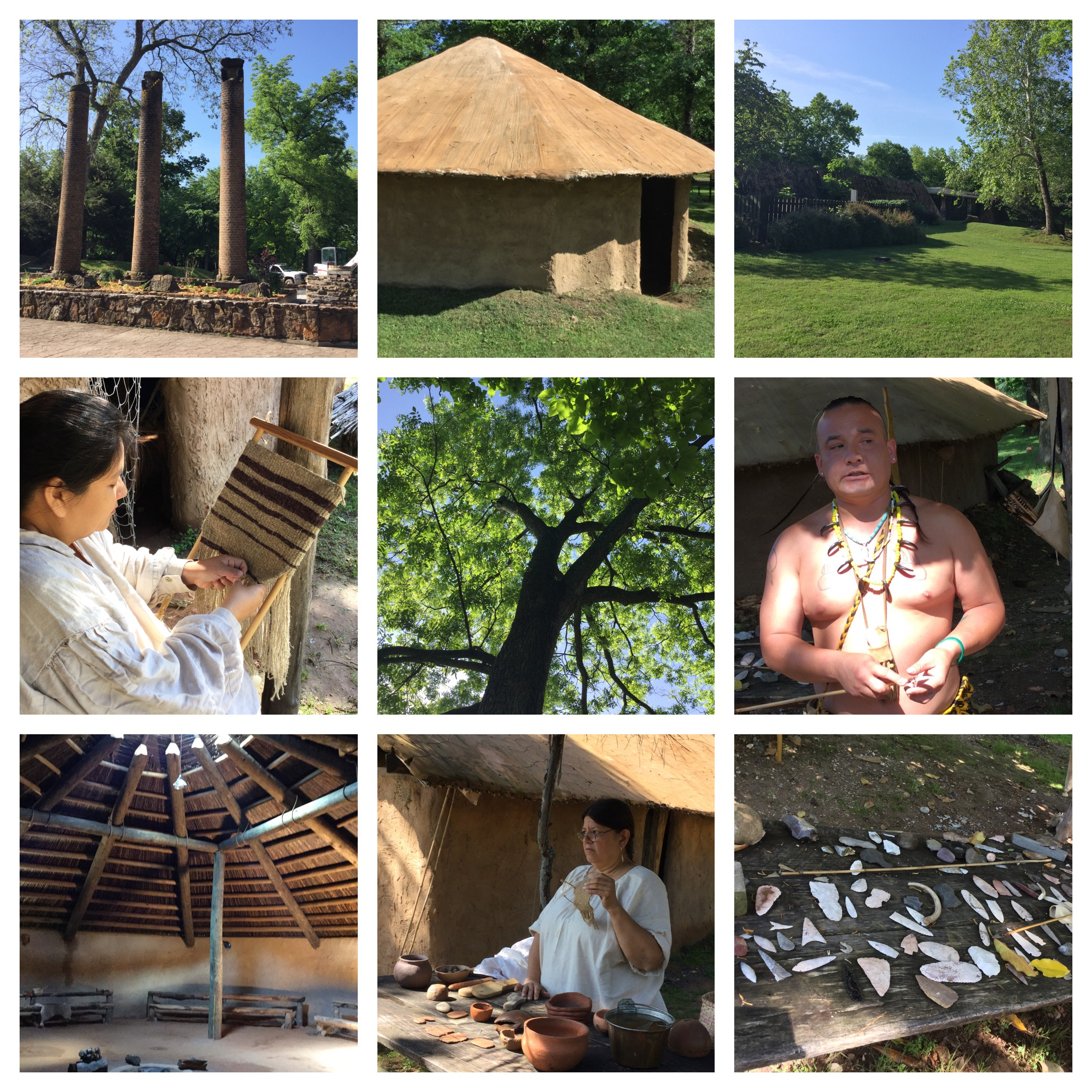
Ancient village

=== Construction begins ===
Actual work commenced on the site of the future Heritage Center on February 23, 1966, under the supervision of Hagerstrand who had agreed to terminate his private business interests and work full-time on the project as General Manager. The Cherokee Foundation, a private charitable foundation organized and largely maintained by Chief Keeler at Bartlesville, Oklahoma agreed to underwrite his salary and expenses during the construction period.

Starting with a work crew of 12 full-blood Cherokees, the initial effort involved selective clearing of the jungle of vines, bushes and trees which covered the entire site, and filling the sink holes that had a century before been a small basement under the old Cherokee seminary building, as well as excavating and salvaging foundation rock from the old seminary for later use. The force soon grew to four crews with up to 52 Cherokees employed. Village construction actually started in May 1966 and continued for over a year. Hand labor, native materials, and traditional methods were used to reproduce historical building techniques.

A three-month "villager" training program, conducted in cooperation with the Bureau of Indian Affairs and NSU, was instituted in the late spring of 1967 using Sequoyah High School facilities. Fifty to sixty Cherokees were trained for the village cast and as guides.

Cherokee artist Cecil Dick provided advice for planting trees and herbs important to Cherokee culture. The grounds feature a wide variety of plant species, used for medicine, food, construction, and tools. The abundant native plant life in turn has attracted animal life and the Cherokee Heritage Center grounds have evolved into an excellent spot for birdwatching and hiking.

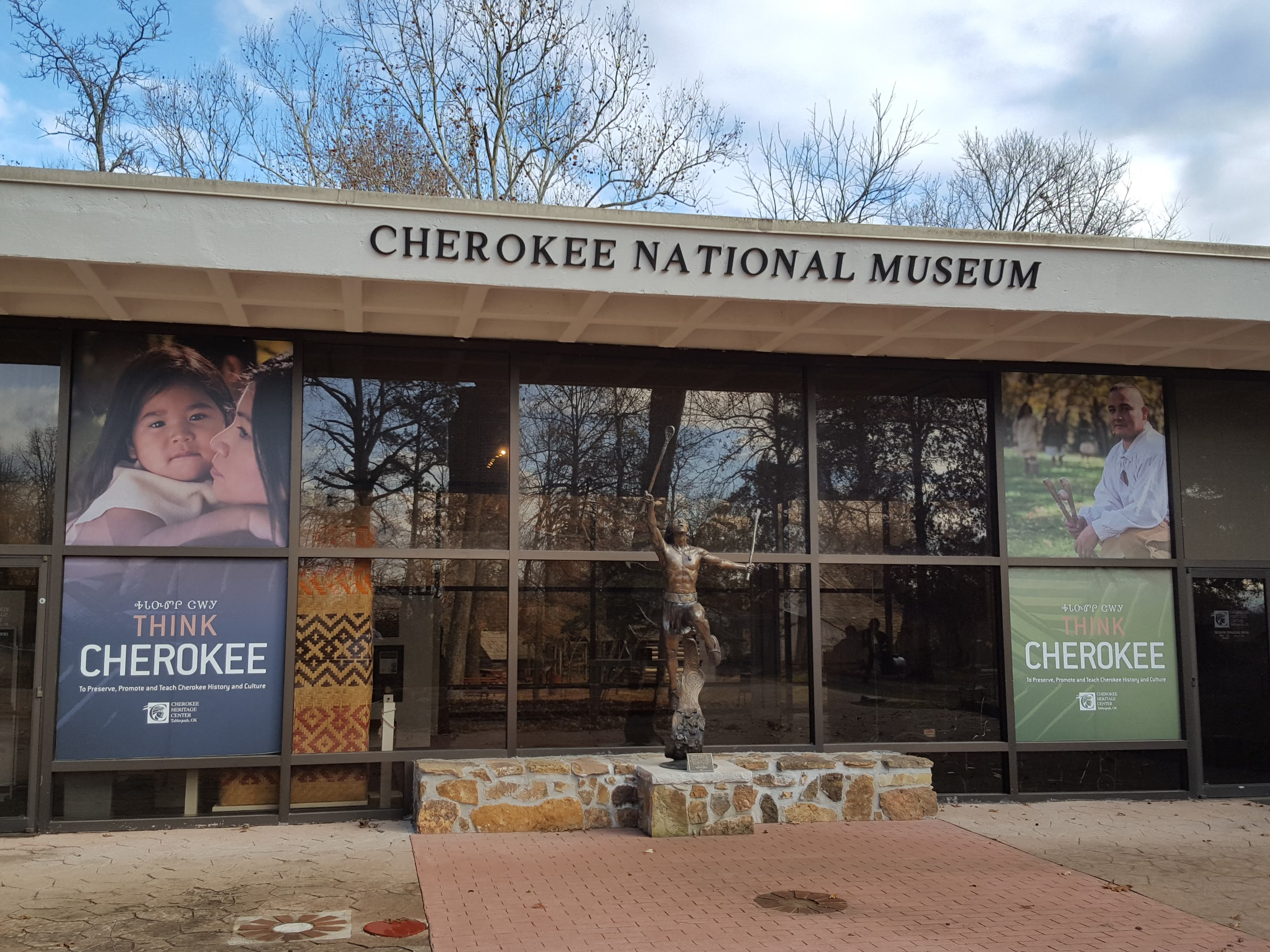

== Open to the public ==
The village at Tsa-La-Gi was dedicated and opened to the public on June 27, 1967. Attendees included Oklahoma Governor Dewey F. Bartlett, United States Senator A. S. "Mike" Monroney, Congressmen Ed Edmondson and Page Belcher.

Every spring since 1971, the Cherokee Heritage Center has hosted an annual juried art show, the Trail of Tears Art Show, open to all tribes. Each fall the Center hosts Cherokee Homecoming, an art show open to any artist enrolled in one of the three federally recognized Cherokee tribes.

From 1969 to 2005 an outdoor play commissioned by the Cherokee Nation, the Trail of Tears, was performed at a large outdoor amphitheater specially constructed for the production. A sequel to Unto These Hills, the play told the story of the forced removal and subsequent life in Oklahoma. The theater, which occasionally hosted other performers and productions, fell into disrepair in the 2000s.

== See also ==
- History of Oklahoma
- List of museums in Oklahoma
