= Lisa Hall (politician) =

American politician

Cherokee Nation Tribal Councilor for the 3rd district
- Incumbent
- Assumed office August 14, 2023
- Preceded by: Wes Nofire

Personal details
- Citizenship: American; Cherokee Nation

Lisa Robison Hall is a Cherokee Nation politician who has served as the Cherokee Nation tribal councilor for the 3rd district since 2023.

== Career ==
Prior to running for office, Hall worked as a trust accounts administrator at the Bureau of Trust Funds Administration's Cherokee Agency (part of the Bureau of Indian Affairs), in the Cherokee County county clerk's office, and for the Cherokee Nation’s Indian Child Welfare and Realty departments.

Hall ran for the Cherokee Nation's 3rd tribal council district in 2023 in a six candidate election against Joseph Tali Byrd, Sara Drywater-Barnett, Dyllon Fite, Brandon Girty, and Brian Speake. She advanced to a runoff alongside Sara Drywater-Barnett, which she won with 62% of the vote. She was sworn in on August 14, 2023.

== See also ==
- List of Native American politicians
- Native American women in politics
