= Tina Glory-Jordan =

Cherokee jurist and politician

Cherokee Nation Supreme Court Justice
- Incumbent
- Assumed office August 31, 2023
- Appointed by: Chuck Hoskin Jr.
- Preceded by: Lee Paden

Cherokee Nation Secretary of State
- In office August 14, 2019 – August 30, 2023
- Appointed by: Chuck Hoskin Jr.
- Preceded by: Chuck Hoskin Jr.
- Succeeded by: Shella Bowlin

Speaker of the Cherokee Nation Tribal Council
- In office February 23, 2012 – 2015
- Succeeded by: Joe Byrd

Cherokee Nation Tribal Councilor for the 1st district
- In office 2007–2015
- Preceded by: Audra Smoke-Conner
- Succeeded by: Rex Jordan

Personal details
- Born: Northeastern Oklahoma, U.S.
- Citizenship: Cherokee Nation; United States
- Spouse: Rex Jordan
- Parent: Tina Glory
- Education: Oklahoma State University–Stillwater; University of Tulsa

Tina Glory-Jordan is a Cherokee jurist and former politician serving as a justice of the Cherokee Nation Supreme Court since 2023. She was previously the secretary of state from 2019 to 2023. Glory-Jordan was a tribal councilor for district 1 from 2007 to 2015 during which time she was elected speaker of the council.

== Life ==
Glory-Jordan was born and raised in northeastern Oklahoma. Her mother is former Cherokee politician, Tina Glory. She earned a bachelor's degree in business from Oklahoma State University–Stillwater and a law degree from the University of Tulsa College of Law. She operated her own law firm in Tahlequah, Oklahoma for 42 years. She specialized in housing law. She is married to Cherokee politician Rex Jordan.

Glory-Jordan was a Cherokee Nation district court judge and delegate to the 1999 Cherokee Nation Constitutional Convention. She served as a Cherokee Nation Tribal Councilor from 2007 to 2015, representing District 1 covering Cherokee West. On February 23, 2012, during her second term, she was elected by her peers to serve as Speaker. Glory-Jordan was also the general counsel for the housing authority of the Cherokee Nation and a gaming commissioner.

After being appointed by principal chief Chuck Hoskin Jr., On August 14, 2019, Glory-Jordan was sworn in to serve as the Cherokee Nation Secretary of State. In this role, Glory-Jordan played a role in guiding the Cherokee Nation through the COVID-19 pandemic response and recovery. She strengthened the Cherokee Nation's relationships with federal partners, including the U.S. Department of Agriculture. Glory-Jordan completed a two-year term on the Federal Communications Commission Intergovernmental Advisory Committee. In December 2022, Glory-Jordan was named to the first-ever Tribal Intergovernmental Advisory Committee by the U.S. Department of Housing and Urban Development, with her term running from November 29, 2022, to November 28, 2024. Glory-Jordan was succeeded as secretary of state by Shella Bowlin on August 31, 2023.

On August 31, 2023, Glory-Jordan was confirmed as a Justice of the Cherokee Nation Supreme Court, replacing Lee Paden who resigned for health reasons. Her nomination by principal chief Hoskin Jr. was approved by the Tribal Council in a 14 to 2 vote.

== See also ==
- List of Native American jurists
- List of Native American politicians
- Native American women in politics
