= Shawn Crittenden =

Cherokee Nation politician

Cherokee Nation Tribal Councilor for the 8th district
- In office August 14, 2015 – August 14, 2023
- Preceded by: Jodie Fishinghawk
- Succeeded by: Codey Poindexter

Personal details
- Citizenship: Cherokee Nation; United States
- Education: Northeastern State University

Shawn Crittenden is a Cherokee Nation politician who served on the Cherokee Nation tribal council representing the 8th district between 2015 and 2023.

== Early life, education and career ==
Shawn Crittenden was raised in Peavine, Oklahoma and graduated from Stilwell High School. He earned his bachelor's degree in education from Northeastern State University in 2007. Prior to running for office, Crittenden worked as a auctioneer, musician, and Greasy Public Schools teacher.

== Tribal Council ==
Crittenden ran for the Cherokee Nation tribal council's 8th district in 2015 to succeed Jodie Fishinghawk. He won the general election with 61% of the vote, defeating Corey Bunch. He was sworn on August 14, 2015. Crittenden ran for re-election in 2019 and faced former tribal councilors Ralph Keen and Jodie Fishinghawk in the election, but Fishinghawk was disqualified before the election for forging signatures on election forms. He defeated Keen with 83% of the vote. He was sworn in for his second term August 14, 2019. He is term limited in 2023.
