= Cherokee Nation =

Native American tribe in Oklahoma, United States

Cherokee Nation ᏣᎳᎩᎯ ᎠᏰᎵ (Cherokee) Tsalagihi Ayeli Cherokee Nation of Oklahoma
- Indian reservation
- Flag Seal

- Location (red) in the U.S. state of Oklahoma

- Location in the United States
- Coordinates: 35°51′8″N 94°59′27″W
- Pre-1794 Cherokee: Pre-Columbian era
- Cherokee Nation (1794–1907): 1794–1907
- Constitution Ratified: September 6, 1839; 187 years ago
- Tribal General Convention convened: August 8, 1938; 88 years ago
- 2nd Constitution Ratified: June 26, 1976; 50 years ago
- 1999 Constitution Ratified: 2003; 23 years ago
- Reservation Recognized: March 11, 2021; 5 years ago
- Capital: Park Hill

Government
  - Type: Republic
  - Body: Cherokee Nation Tribal Council
  - Principal Chief: Chuck Hoskin Jr. (D)
  - Deputy Principal Chief: Bryan Warner (D)
  - Speaker: Johnny Kidwell (I)
  - Chief Justice: John C. Garrett (I)
  - U.S. House Delegate-designee: Kimberly Teehee (D)

Area
  - Total: 6,963 sq mi (18,030 km^{2})
  - Land: 6,694 sq mi (17,340 km^{2})
  - Water: 269 sq mi (700 km^{2})

Population (2026)
  - Total: 477,673
- Demonym: Cherokee
- Time zone: UTC– 06:00 (CST)
  - Summer (DST): UTC– 05:00 (CDT)
- Area code(s): 918 and 539
- Website: cherokee.org

The Cherokee Nation (Cherokee: ᏣᎳᎩᎯ ᎠᏰᎵ, romanized: Tsalagihi Ayeli or ᏣᎳᎩᏰᎵ, Tsalagiyehli) is the largest of three federally recognized tribes of Cherokee people in the United States. Headquartered in Park Hill, Oklahoma, in proximity to Tahlequah, the nation had 477,673 enrolled citizens as of 2026 (including 289,619 living in Oklahoma), making it one of the largest tribal nations in the country.

The tribe includes people descended from members of the Old Cherokee Nation who relocated, due to increasing pressure, from the Southeast to Indian Territory and Cherokee who were forced to relocate on the Trail of Tears. The tribe also includes descendants of Cherokee Freedmen and the Natchez Nation.

The nation operates under a constitution ratified in 2003, with executive, legislative, and judicial branches. In 2020 and 2021, federal and state courts affirmed that the Cherokee Nation's reservation—spanning 14 counties in northeastern Oklahoma—was never disestablished, restoring reservation status under the McGirt v. Oklahoma precedent. The nation has jurisdiction within this territory.

The nation publishes the Cherokee Phoenix, the first Native American newspaper, and operates Cherokee language immersion schools.

The Cherokee Nation has a reservation spanning 14 counties in the northeastern corner of Oklahoma. These are Adair, Cherokee, Craig, Delaware, Mayes, McIntosh, Muskogee, Nowata, Ottawa, Rogers, Sequoyah, Tulsa, Wagoner, and Washington counties.

== History ==
=== Reconstruction and the 1866 Treaty ===
After Cherokee removal on the Trail of Tears, the Cherokee Nation existed in Indian Territory. After the American Civil War, the United States promised the Cherokee Nation "a permanent homeland" in an 1866 treaty. In exchange, the Cherokee Nation (and the other four of the Five Civilized Tribes) gave the United States parts of its western territory that were then organized into Oklahoma Territory. Unlike most reservations, the Cherokee Nation owned fee simple title to its lands, and they were not held in trust by the United States. While the General Allotment Act had exceptions for the Five Tribes, later acts forced the Cherokee Nation to allot its reservation to members. In 1906, Congress enacted the Five Tribes Act which contemplated the dissolution of tribes, but also included a clause stating "the tribal existence and present tribal governments of [the Five Tribes] are hereby continued in full force and effect for all purposes authorized by law." In the early 20th century, courts interpreted the legislation as having dissolved tribal governments, but by the late 1970s courts shifted their interpretations to finding tribal government had never been disestablished.

=== Early 20th century ===
After the near dissolution of the tribal government of the Cherokee Nation in the 1900s and the death of William Charles Rogers in 1917, the Federal government began to appoint chiefs to the Cherokee Nation in 1919. The service time for each appointed chief was so brief that it became known as "Chief for a Day". Six men fell under this category, the first being Andrew B. Cunningham, who served from November 8 to November 25.

In the 1930s, the Franklin D. Roosevelt administration worked to improve conditions by supporting the Indian Reorganization Act of 1934, which encouraged tribes to reconstitute their governments and write constitutions. On August 8, 1938, the tribe convened a general convention in Fairfield, Oklahoma to elect a Chief. They chose J. B. Milam as Principal Chief. President Franklin D. Roosevelt confirmed the election in 1941. W. W. Keeler was appointed chief in 1949. After the U.S. government under President Richard Nixon had adopted a self-determination policy, the nation was able to rebuild its government. The people elected W. W. Keeler as chief. Keeler, who was also the president of Phillips Petroleum, was succeeded by Ross Swimmer. In 1975, the tribe drafted a constitution, under the name Cherokee Nation of Oklahoma, which was ratified on June 26, 1976. In 1985 Wilma Mankiller was elected as the first female chief of the Cherokee Nation.

=== 1997 constitutional crisis ===
The Cherokee Nation was seriously destabilized in May 1997 in what was variously described as either a nationalist "uprising" or an "anti-constitutional coup" instigated by Joe Byrd, the Principal Chief. Elected in 1995, Byrd became locked in a battle of strength with the judicial branch of the Cherokee tribe. The crisis came to a head on March 22, 1997, when Byrd said in a press conference that he would decide which orders of the Cherokee Nation's Supreme Court were lawful and which were not.

A simmering crisis continued over Byrd's creation of a private, armed paramilitary force. On June 20, 1997, his private militia illegally seized custody of the Cherokee Nation Courthouse from its legal caretakers and occupants, the Cherokee Nation Marshals, the Judicial Appeals Tribunal, and its court clerks. The courts demanded the courthouse's return, but Byrd refused. The Federal authorities of the United States initially refused to intervene because of potential breach of tribal sovereignty.

Byrd was required to attend a meeting in Washington, D.C. with the Bureau of Indian Affairs, at which he was compelled to reopen the courts. Byrd served the remainder of his term but lost the 1999 election for Principal Chief to Chad Smith. He was later elected to the Tribal Council in 2013.

A new constitution was drafted in 1999 that included procedures for voters to remove officials from office, changed the structure of the tribal council, and removed the need to ask the Bureau of Indian Affairs' permission to amend the constitution. The tribe and Bureau of Indian Affairs negotiated changes to the new constitution, and it was ratified in 2003. Confusion resulted when the US Secretary of the Interior Gale Norton would not approve it. To overcome the impasse, the Cherokee Nation voted by referendum to amend its 1975/1976 Constitution "to remove Presidential approval authority," allowing the tribe to independently ratify and amend its own constitution. As of August 9, 2007, the BIA gave the Cherokee Nation consent to amend its Constitution without approval from the Department of the Interior.

=== 21st century ===
==== Same-sex marriage ====
On June 14, 2004, the Cherokee Nation Tribal Council voted to officially define marriage as a union between a woman and man, thereby excluding same-sex marriage. This decision came in response to an application by a lesbian couple submitted on May 13.

On December 9, 2016, same-sex marriage was legalized through an opinion by Todd Hembree, the Cherokee Nation's attorney general. In the opinion, Hembree stated that the 2004 law violated the Cherokee Constitution, which requires equal treatment of tribal citizens. He issued the opinion because the director of the tribe's tax commission sought a decision as to whether the tribe could issue a vehicle tag to a same-sex couple married outside the tribe's jurisdiction.

==== Reservation reconstituted ====
On July 9, 2020, the United States Supreme Court ruled in a 5–4 decision that the original treaties, and promise of a reservation, with the Five Civilized Tribes (specifically the Muscogee in McGirt v. Oklahoma) were never withdrawn. This decision allowed for the restoration of the reservation status of the Cherokee Nation in a later decision. The majority opinion was held by justices Sonia Sotomayor, Ruth Bader Ginsburg, Elena Kagan, Stephen Breyer, and Neil Gorsuch. Hogner v. Oklahoma was decided on March 11, 2021, in Oklahoma Courts and found that the Cherokee Nation "reservation was established and had never been disestablished."

Cherokee Nation Principal Chief Chuck Hoskin, Jr. said: "We have long held that Cherokee Nation has a reservation, rooted in our treaties, as the Supreme Court of the United States has now affirmed" and "This proposed legislation will cement our reservation boundaries and the broad tribal jurisdiction the Supreme Court recognized in the McGirt decision. We will continue to work with the state of Oklahoma and our federal partners to ensure the safety of the public." The United Keetoowah Band of Cherokee Indians claims it has rights to the reservation as well as a "successor in interest" because they contend the original Cherokee Nation was "sunset" after "the last of its original members who signed the Dawes Roll died in 2012 at age 107." Therefore, the current Cherokee Nation is no longer the same Cherokee Nation that made the agreements with the federal government, it is only a "successor" like the UKB. However, the Cherokee Nation has argued the United Keetoowah Band's argument is legally incorrect and only the Cherokee Nation has jurisdiction to the 14 county reservation and that the United Keetoowah Band only has jurisdiction over their 76 acres of trust land.

==== COVID-19 pandemic ====
The COVID-19 pandemic struck the Cherokee Nation hard in 2020. Hundreds of Cherokee lost their lives under the pandemic. On March 18, 2021, the Cherokee Nation held a memorial to remember those Cherokee lost to the virus. The memorial honored 107 Cherokee including more than 50 Cherokee first-language speaking elders.

On August 3, 2021, the Cherokee Nation Health Services suspended elective surgeries after experiencing an 80% increase in COVID-19 cases. It also activated its "surge plan" for W.W. Hastings Hospital in Tahlequah, Oklahoma. The "surge plan" increases the in-patient capacity of the hospital by 50% by reallocating non-Intensive Care Unit space to emergency room space. The COVID-19 delta variant accounted for 80% of new cases in the nation.

== Demographics ==
As of 2018, 360,589 people were enrolled in the Cherokee Nation as citizens. Citizens live in every state, with 2018 populations of 240,417 in Oklahoma, 22,124 in California, 18,406 in Texas, 12,734 in Arkansas, 11,014 in Kansas, and less than 10,000 in each other state. By 2021, enrollment reached 400,000, making the Cherokee Nation the second most populous tribe, closely behind the Navajo Nation. About 140,000 citizens live in the Cherokee Nation reservation area. In 2023, the nation's enrollment reached 450,000. In 2024, the nation released updated demographics maps showing the nation's total population in the United States was approximately 466,118.

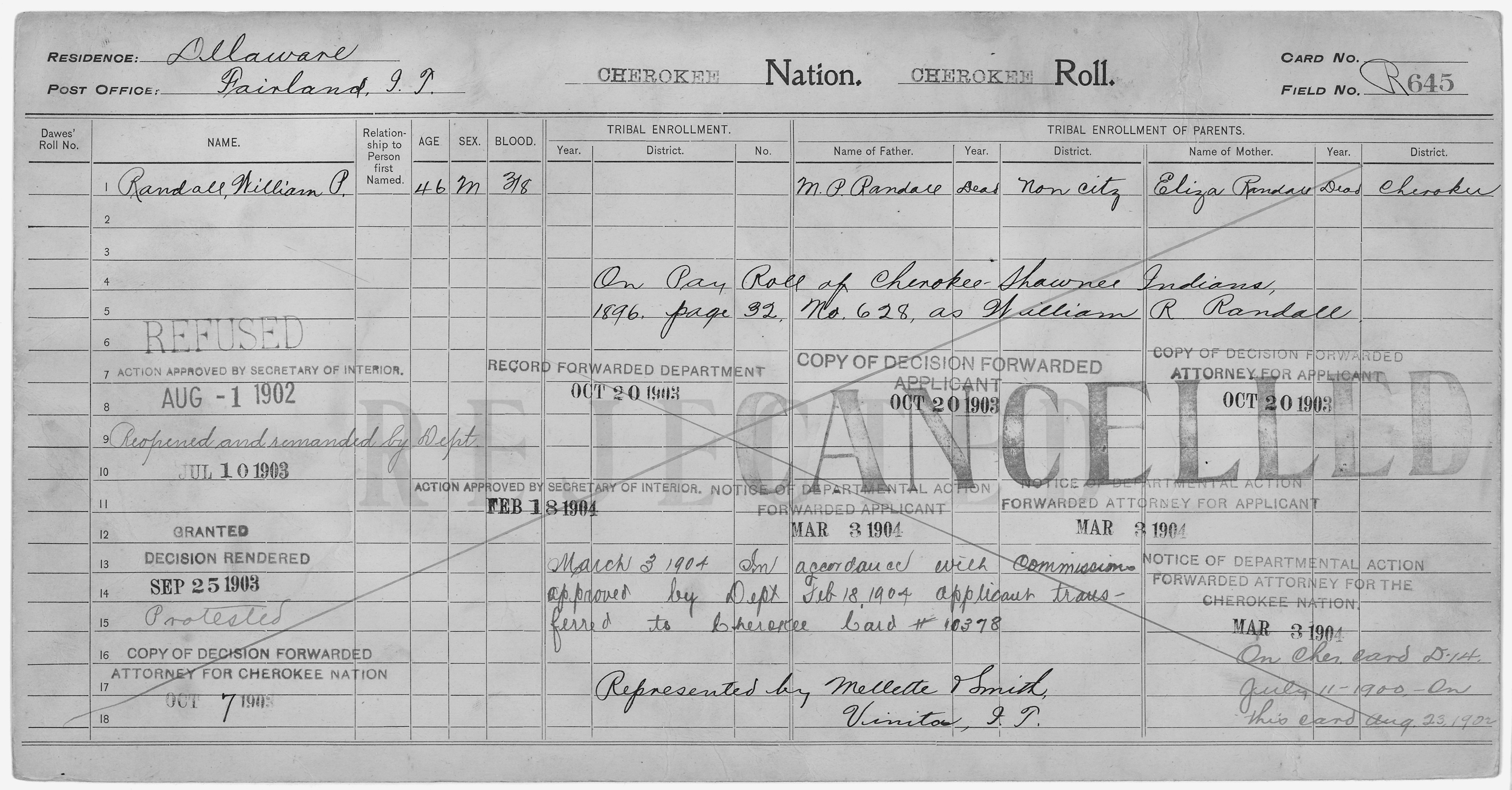
Example of a Cherokee census card for Fairland, Oklahoma, from the first few years of the 20th century.

=== Citizenship requirements ===
To be considered a citizen in the Cherokee Nation, an individual needs a direct ancestor listed on the Dawes Rolls as a citizen of the nation, whether as a Cherokee Indian or as one of the Cherokee Freedmen. The tribe has members who also have some degree of African, Latino, Asian, European, and other ancestries. In the case of the Cherokee Freedmen, members may be predominantly or wholly African American. Members of the Natchez Nation joined the Cherokee Nation, as did other southeastern tribes in the 18th century. Unlike the United Keetoowah Band of Cherokee Indians (UKB) and Eastern Band of Cherokee Indians (EBCI), blood quantum is not a factor in Cherokee Nation tribal citizenship eligibility. Neither is race, though race came into play when creating the Dawes Roll, where legitimate "Cherokee citizens of mixed blood who could get away with it were enrolled as less Cherokee than they really were in order to be able to sell or lease their land sooner" and some "whites without a legitimate claim were falsely enrolled."

==== Criticism of the Dawes Rolls ====
Author Robert J. Conley has critiqued the use of the Dawes Roll to determine membership, stating that at one point he was only a registered voter in the nation but did not actually hold a CDIB card as required by the nation, leading him to leave the tribe for the UKB, which required less "documentation" at the time, but still required blood quantum. Conley condemns the Dawes Rolls for "being inefficient, faulty, even fraudulent" and stating that if "the Cherokee Nation is really serious about exercising its sovereignty and determining its membership," then it should not use the roll that "was put together by the U.S. government and then closed by the U.S. government," meaning that the nation is "not allowed to have [a current roll] by the U.S. Congress" and therefore is still subject to the settler definitions of its members. Scholars like Osage Nation member Tink Tinker critique tribes for functioning like a state, labeling it a "European construct" and wishing tribes would turn their attention from "reforming the state to (re)building the 'small, local, autonomous communities' that flourished around the world prior to 1492." They believe that this "would allow actual Indigenous sovereignty and self-determination" and that "history tells us that nations and peoples can be organized in multiple and overlapping ways. Territories have long been shared between peoples, and individuals have often identified themselves within networks of relationships rather than as subjects of a particular state sovereign."

Basing citizenship off the Dawes Rolls and other rolls is what scholar Fay A. Yarbrough calls "dramatically different from older conceptions of Cherokee identity based on clan relationships, in which individuals could be fully Cherokee without possessing any Cherokee ancestry" and that by the tribe later "developing a quantifiable definition of Cherokee identity based on ancestry", this "would dramatically affect the process of enrollment late in the nineteenth century and the modern procedure of obtaining membership in the Cherokee Nation, both of which require tracing an individuals' lineage to a 'Cherokee by blood.'" Thus, the Dawes Roll itself still upholds "by blood" language and theory. Mark Edwin Miller acknowledges in his work that many of descent people left the tribes and "assimilated into existing, non-tribal (if also nonwhite) communities," and thus, without a tribe, cannot be recognized by the BIA. Miller also states that even "so-called purely 'descendancy' tribes such as the Five Tribes with no blood quantum requirement jealously guard some proven, documentary link by blood to distant ancestors. More than any single BIA requirement, however, this criterion has proven troublesome for southeastern groups [seeking federal recognition] because of its reliance on non-Indian records and the confused (and confusing) nature of surviving documents."

=== Cherokee Freedmen ===
The Cherokee Freedmen, descendants of African American slaves owned by citizens of the Cherokee Nation during the Antebellum Period, were first guaranteed Cherokee citizenship under a new treaty made in 1866 with the United States. This was in the wake of the American Civil War, when the US emancipated slaves by passing a constitutional amendment granting freedmen citizenship in the United States. After the war the US government required that the Cherokee Nation, which under pressure had briefly allied with the Confederate States of America, end slavery and grant full citizenship to Freedmen living within their nation. Those who left could become United States citizens.

However, despite "the promises of the 1866 treaty, the freedmen were never fully accepted as citizens of the Cherokee Nation" during the 19th and 20th centuries.

In practice, enrollment in the Cherokee Nation rolls was often strongly influenced by race. During creation of the Dawes Rolls prior to allotment of tribal communal lands to households, many Freedmen and Afro-Cherokees were listed separately from Cherokee by blood, regardless of their ancestry or culture. As a result, they did not receive land allotments and later were for a time excluded from tribal membership.

==== Rights revoked ====
A sizable number of Freedmen "were ignorant of the treaty clause which provided for their right of incorporation into the tribe."

In the 20th century, the Cherokee Nation passed a law to limit membership to descendants of those listed as "Cherokee by blood" on the Dawes Rolls, excluding numerous African Americans and Afro-Cherokees who had been members of the tribe. In a recognition of Cherokee sovereignty, in 1989 the federal court in the Freedmen case of Nero v. Cherokee Nation held that the Cherokee Nation could legally determine its own citizenship requirements, even if that meant excluding descendants of Freedmen who had formerly been considered citizens.

==== Rights restored ====
But on March 7, 2006, the Cherokee Nation Judicial Appeal Tribunal ruled that the Cherokee Freedmen were eligible for Cherokee citizenship. The Cherokee Freedman had historically been recorded as "citizens" of the Cherokee Nation since 1866, and their ancestors were recorded on the Dawes Commission Land Rolls (although generally in the category of Cherokee Freedmen, even if they qualified as "Cherokee by blood", as many did.) The ruling "did not limit membership to people possessing Cherokee blood," as some Freedmen and their descendants had never intermarried with Cherokees. Well-known genealogist, historian, and Freedmen advocate David Cornsilk notes that other historical citizenship bases are still excluded to this day (such as an ancestor tied to an older roll). On May 15, 2007, the Cherokee Nation Tribal Courts reinstated the Cherokee Freedmen as citizens while appeals were pending in the Cherokee Nation Courts and Federal Court. On May 22, 2007, the Cherokee Nation received notice from the United States Bureau of Indian Affairs that the BIA and Federal Government had denied the amendment to the 1975 Cherokee Nation Constitution because it required BIA approval, which had not been obtained. The BIA also noted that the Cherokee Nation had excluded the Cherokee Freedmen from voting on the amendment. On this issue, the Cherokee Nation Supreme Court ruled that the Cherokee Nation could take away the approval authority which it had previously granted the federal government. Pending the resolution of litigation, the Cherokee Freedman had all rights as full Cherokee Nation citizens, including voting rights and access to tribal services. In early 2011, the tribal district court ruled that the special election in 2007 on the constitutional amendment was unconstitutional, as it excluded Freedmen from voting. The Nation appealed. On August 22, 2011, the Cherokee Supreme Court upheld the results of the 2007 special election. Chuck Trimble, a former executive director of the National Congress of American Indians, characterized the decision as the "Cherokee Dred Scott Decision", for depriving a group of citizenship.

At the same time, the Cherokee Supreme Court ordered a special run-off election to be held September 24, 2011 to settle the office of Principal Chief. Earlier voting in this year's election had been so close that the incumbent Chad Smith and challenger Bill John Baker, longtime Cherokee National Council member, had each twice been declared the winner. On September 11, the nation sent letters to Freedmen, notifying them of their loss of citizenship and voting rights. The US Department of Housing and Urban Development froze $33 million in funds to the Cherokee Nation while studying the case, pursuant to a stipulation in the 2008 congressional renewal of Self-Determination Act. On September 13, 2011, the Department of the Interior strongly urged the Cherokee Nation to restore voting rights and benefits to descendants of Cherokee Freedmen, including the right to vote in the special election for Principal Chief, at the risk of violating its constitution and the US Constitution. On September 14, the Cherokee AG recommended reinstatement of the Freedmen, pending a hearing for oral arguments. On September 20, Judge Henry H. Kennedy Jr. of the US District Court announced the Cherokee Nation, Freedmen plaintiffs and US government had come to an agreement in a preliminary hearing to allow the Freedmen to vote, with voting to continue through October 5 if necessary. On August 30, 2017, the United States District Court for the District of Columbia ruled in favor of the Freedmen descendants and the U.S. Department of the Interior, granting the Freedmen descendants full rights to citizenship in the Cherokee Nation. The Cherokee Nation has accepted this decision, effectively ending the dispute.

In 2021, Shawna Baker, a justice on the Cherokee Nation Supreme Court, published the written opinion, Effect of Cherokee Nation v. Nash & Vann v. Zinke, CNSC-2017-07. The Supreme Court then ruled to remove the words "by blood" from its constitution and other legal doctrines because "[t]he words, added to the constitution in 2007, have been used to exclude Black people whose ancestors were enslaved by the tribe from obtaining full Cherokee Nation citizenship rights." However, all citizenship is still based on finding an ancestor tied to the Dawes Rolls, which is not without its own controversy apart from blood quantum. Some people of descent are still excluded, like the author Shonda Buchanan who states in her memoir Black Indian that she has ancestors on Cherokee Rolls that were not the Dawes, so would thus still not be recognized. The changes to the Cherokee Nation constitution are still being challenged after the change, most recently by Robin Mayes who appealed for a new election.

On September 13, 2021, Marilyn Vann became the first Cherokee Freedmen descendant to be confirmed to a Cherokee government commission when she was appointed to the Environmental Protection Commission by Principal Chief Chuck Hoskin Jr.

== Government ==
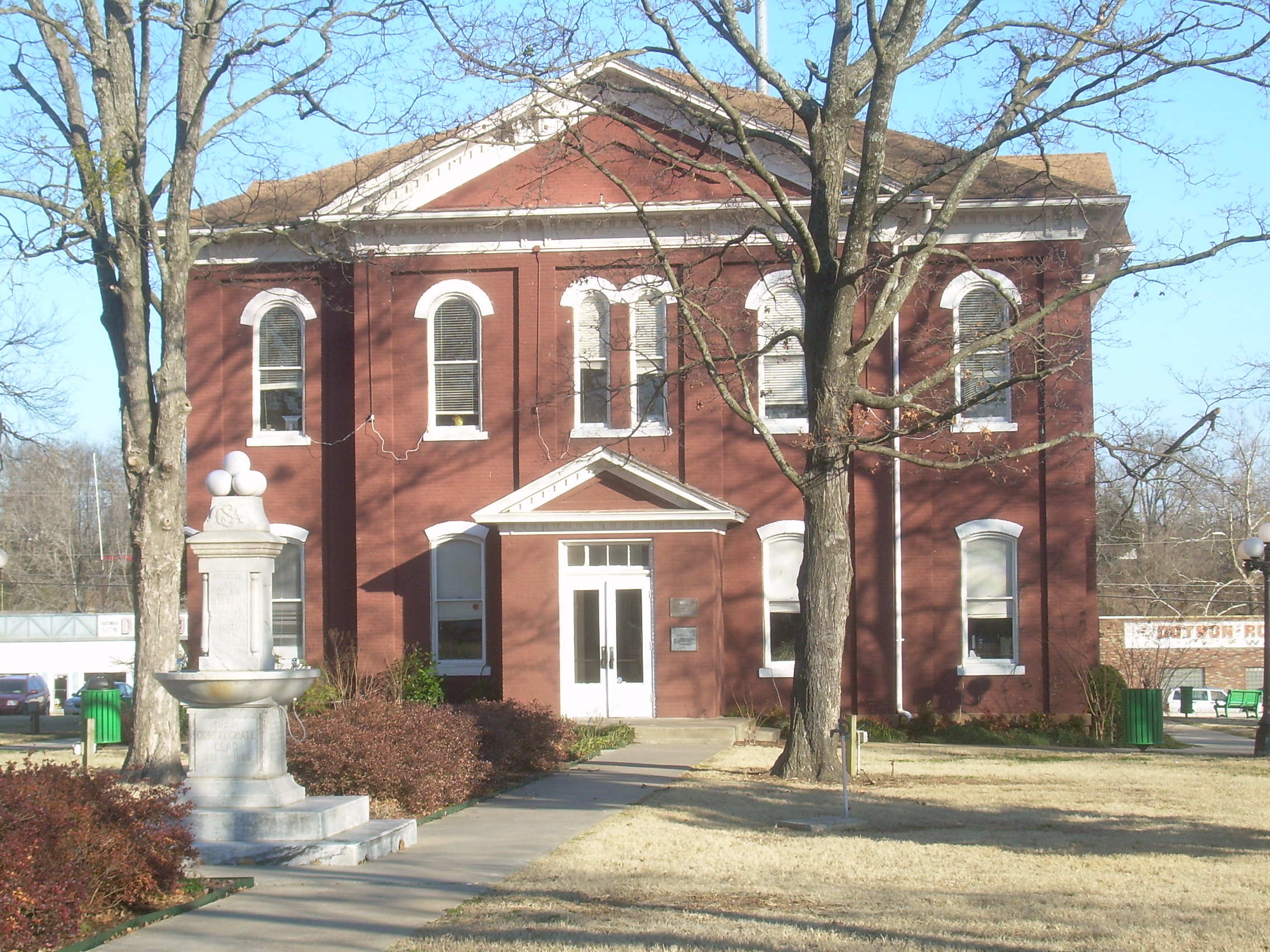
Cherokee Nation Historic Courthouse in Tahlequah, built in 1849, is the oldest public building standing in the state of Oklahoma.

The nation's headquarters is in W.W. Keeler Tribal Complex in the Park Hill census-designated place, an unincorporated area in Cherokee County. The building has a "Tahlequah, Oklahoma" post office address city name.

Map of Cherokee Nation's tribal jurisdictional area (OTSA) and nearby jurisdiction areas, with shown subdivisions.

The 1999 revision of the Cherokee Nation constitution

The Cherokee Nation has legislative, executive and judicial branches with executive power vested in the principal chief, legislative power in the Tribal Council, and judicial power in the Tribal Supreme Court. The principal chief, deputy chief, and tribal council are elected to four-year terms by the registered tribal voters over the age of 18.

The nation's current system of government was established by the constitution of 1999, which was adopted by tribal citizens in 2003, and implemented in 2006. Every 20 years, the constitution requires a vote among tribal members, to decide whether a new constitutional convention should be held.

The Congress of the United States, the federal courts, and state courts have repeatedly upheld the sovereignty of Native Tribes, defining their relationship in political rather than racial terms, and have stated it is a compelling interest of the United States. This principle of self-government and tribal sovereignty is controversial. According to the Boston College sociologist and Cherokee, Eva Marie Garroutte, up to 32 separate definitions of "Indian" are used in federal legislation, as of a 1978 congressional survey. The 1994 Federal Legislation AIRFA (American Indian Religious Freedom Act) defines an Indian as one who belongs to an Indian Tribe, which is a group that "is recognized as eligible for the special programs and services provided by the United States to Indians because of their status as Indians."

=== Legislative branch ===
The council is the legislative branch of government. One councilor is elected to represent each of the 15 districts of the Cherokee Nation in the 14 county tribal jurisdictional area. Two tribal council members represent the at-large citizenry – those who live outside the tribe's 14-county jurisdictional area in northeastern Oklahoma. The 17 councilors total are elected to staggered four-year terms. The deputy chief serves as president of the council, and casts tie-breaking votes when necessary.

Tribal Councilors
District	Councilor	First elected	Next Re-election Year	Officers
1	Sasha Blackfox-Qualls	2023	2027	
2	Candessa Tehee	2021	2029	
3	Lisa Hall	2023	2027	
4	Uriah Grass	2025	2029	
5	Ashley Grant	2025	2029	
6	Daryl Legg	2019	2027	
7	Joshua Sam	2021	2029	Secretary
8	Codey Poindexter	2023	2027	
9	Clifton Hughes	2025	2029	
10	Melvina Shotpouch	2021	2029	
11	Kendra McGeady	2024	2029	
12	Dora Patzkowski	2019	2027	
13	Joe Deere	2019	2027	
14	Kevin Easley Jr.	2023	2027	Deputy Speaker
15	Danny Callison	2021	2029	
At-Large	Johnny Jack Kidwell	2021	2029	Council Speaker
At-Large	Julia Coates	2019	2027	

=== Executive branch ===
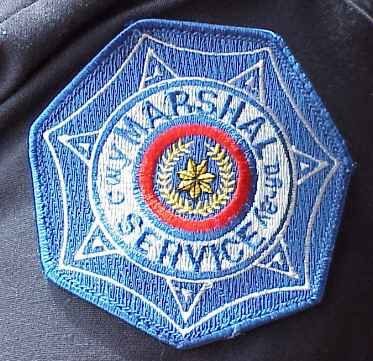
Cherokee Nation Marshal Service Patch

The principal chief is the head of the executive branch of the Cherokee National Government, responsible for overseeing an annual budget of over $600 million and more than 3,000 full-time employees. The current principal chief, elected June 1, 2019, is Chuck Hoskin Jr., who formerly held the office of Cherokee Nation secretary of state. The deputy chief acts as the chief in his or her absence. The chief is assisted in managing the executive branch by the secretary of state, the attorney general, the marshal, the treasurer, and several group leaders. The government's functions are divided into several groups, each headed by a group leader. These groups are further divided into several service areas which provide governmental services to the Cherokee people. As of July 2011, there are fifteen groups:

- Education Services Group – oversees all early childhood development programs, cultural and historical preservation efforts, higher education scholarships, and operates several schools for Cherokee students
- Health Services Group – provides direct care and community health services, including the operation of eight regional health clinics and one central hospital facility
- Financial Resources Group – central accounting, budgeting, and acquisition services for the entire Government
- Community Services Group – provides public transit services, constructs road and sanitary sewer infrastructure projects, environmental health services, and self-help housing assistance
- Management Resources Group – provides centralized support services to the entire government, including facilities management, risk management, natural resources preservation, and long range planning and development
- Commerce Services Group – operates the nation's Small Business Assistance Center which provides financial support to Cherokee-owned business, provides mortgage assistance to Cherokee homebuyers, and promotes cultural tourism
- Human Services Group – provides family assistance programs, child support services, child care centers, child welfare and protective services, and veterans affairs services
- Government Resources Group – oversees funds received from the Federal Government, manages all Tribal property, and oversees Tribal registration
- Housing Services Group – operates low-income and elderly rental property for citizens, provides rehabilitation to private homes, provides mortgage assistance to citizens, and provides subsidy for rental properties
- Career Services Group – provides job training, job relocation assistance, vocational rehabilitation, and operates "Talking Leaves" Job Corps Facility
- Leadership Services Group – operates the Cherokee Ambassador program, manages the Cherokee National Youth Choir, the Cherokee Youth Leadership Council, and various Summer Camps
- Office of the Attorney General – provides legal advice and representation to the tribe and prosecutes violators of Tribal law
- Cherokee Marshal Service – provides full service law enforcement services to the nation
- Human Resources Group – provides centralize personnel management for all employee recruitment and management affairs of the government
- Information Systems Group – provides centralized information technology management for the government

The executive branch is also composed of five independent agencies that exercise power autonomously from the control of the principal chief:

- Tax Commission
- Election Commission
- Environmental Protection Commission
- Gaming Commission
- The Cherokee Phoenix

=== Judicial branch ===
The judicial branch of tribal government includes the District Court and Supreme Court, which is comparable to the U.S. Supreme Court. The Supreme Court consists of five members who are appointed by the principal chief to ten-year, staggered terms and confirmed by the council. It is the highest court of the Cherokee Nation and oversees internal legal disputes and appeals from the District Court. The District Court hears all cases brought before it under jurisdiction of the Cherokee Nation Judicial Code. The Court on the Judiciary is a seven-member body which oversees the judicial system. It consists of two members appointed by each of the three branches of government; one of the two must be a lawyer and the other must not be. A seventh member is chosen jointly by the three branches of government.

Current members of the Cherokee Nation Supreme Court are:

- Tina Glory-Jordan
- Mark L. Dobbins
- John C. Garrett
- Rex Earl Starr
- Amy Page

=== U.S. House of Representatives delegate ===
The Cherokee Nation also has the right to appoint a delegate to the U.S. House of Representatives, per the 1835 Treaty of New Echota. In 2019, Kimberly Teehee was appointed the first ever delegate to the U.S. House of Representatives from the Cherokee Nation, in accordance with the 1835 treaty, though Congress has not yet seated her.

=== Services ===
As of 2014, the Cherokee Seed Project of the Natural Resources Department offers "two breeds of corn, two kinds of beans (including Trail of Tears beans), two gourds and medicinal tobacco" to Cherokee Nation members.

Eleven satellite communities have been organized by the tribe in areas of high Cherokee Nation populations. These communities are composed of a majority of enrolled Cherokee Nation citizens. These communities are a way for enrolled Cherokee citizens to connect with Cherokee heritage and culture, and to be more politically engaged. These communities are located in Arizona, California, Colorado, New Mexico, Texas, Florida, and central Oklahoma.

==== Health ====
The Cherokee Nation has constructed health clinics throughout Oklahoma, contributed to community development programs, built roads and bridges, constructed learning facilities and universities for its citizens, instilled the practice of Gadugi and self-reliance, revitalized language immersion programs for its children and youth, and is a powerful and positive economic and political force in Eastern Oklahoma. In the early 21st century, the tribe assumed control of W. W. Hastings Hospital in Tahlequah, previously operated by the US Indian Health Service. The Cherokee Nation has gotten positive feedback on their COVID-19 response in comparison to the rest of the US.

== Intertribal relations ==
=== Inter-Tribal Environmental Council ===
Since 1992, the nation has served on Inter-Tribal Environmental Council. The mission of ITEC is to protect the health of Native Americans, their natural resources and their environment as it relates to air, land and water. To accomplish this mission, ITEC provides technical support, training, and environmental services in a variety of environmental disciplines.

=== Intertribal citizenship ===
The Cherokee Nation participates in numerous joint programs with the Eastern Band of Cherokee Indians, including cultural exchange programs and joint Tribal Council meetings involving councilors from both Cherokee tribes that address issues affecting all Cherokee people. The United Keetoowah Band tribal council unanimously passed a resolution to approach the Cherokee Nation for a joint council meeting between the two nations.

The "Loyal Shawnee," Shawnee people who sided with the Union Army during the American Civil War, were forcibly removed from Kansas, and 722 Loyal Shawnee joined the Cherokee Nation in Indian Territory in 1869. In 2000, they left the Cherokee Nation and achieved independent federal recognition as the Shawnee Tribe.

Similarly, a band of Lenape joined the Cherokee Nation in 1867. On July 28, 2009, they achieved independent federal recognition as the Delaware Tribe of Indians.

=== Tribal heritage groups ===
Many groups have sought recognition by the federal government as Cherokee tribes, but today there are only three groups so recognized. Cherokee Nation spokesman Mike Miller has said that some groups, which he calls Cherokee Heritage Groups, are encouraged. Others have created controversy by their attempts to gain economically through their claims to be Cherokee. The three federally recognized groups say that only they have the legal right to present themselves as Cherokee Indian Tribes.

The Mount Tabor Indian Community was recognized as a tribe by the State of Texas in 2017. Cherokee descendants must trace lineal descent from one or more of the six progenitor families. All citizens of the Cherokee Nation must be original enrollees or descendants of original enrollees listed on the Dawes Commission Rolls.

== Economy ==
The Cherokee Nation controls Cherokee Nation Businesses, a holding company which owns companies in gaming, construction, aerospace and defense, manufacturing, technology, real estate, and healthcare industries. The Nation also operates its own housing authority and issues Tribal vehicle and boat tags. The Cherokee Nation's estimated annual economic impact is $1.06 billion on the state's economy, $401 million in salaries, and supports 13,527 Cherokee and non-Cherokee jobs.

== Culture ==
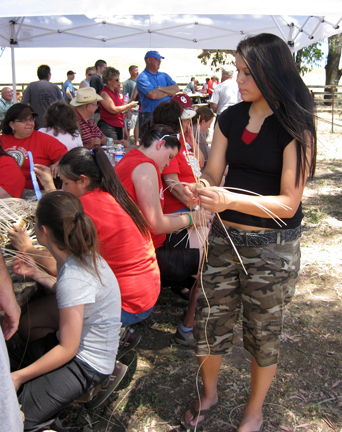
Basket weaving workshop sponsored by the nation.

The Cherokee Nation council appropriates money for historic foundations concerned with the preservation of Cherokee culture, including the Cherokee Heritage Center. It operates living history exhibits including a reconstructed ancient Cherokee village, Adams Rural Village (a turn-of-the-century village), Nofire Farms, and the Cherokee Family Research Center for genealogy, which is open to the public. The Cherokee Nation hosts the Cherokee National Holiday on Labor Day weekend each year, attracting 80,000 to 90,000 Cherokee to Tahlequah for the festivities. Miss Cherokee is an annual competition taking place during the Cherokee National Holiday.

=== Art ===
The Cherokee Heritage Center is home to the Cherokee National Museum, which has numerous exhibitions also open to the public. The CHC is the repository for the Cherokee Nation as its National Archives. The CHC operates under the Cherokee National Historical Society, Inc., and is governed by a board of trustees with an executive committee. The nation also supports the Cherokee Nation Film Festivals in Tahlequah and participates in the Sundance Film Festival in Park City, Utah.

=== Music and dance ===
Ethno-musicologists such as Gertrude Prokosch Kurath and Charlotte Heth, a member of the Cherokee nation, undertook fieldwork and academic study of Cherokee music and dance, publishing widely on the topics and, in Heth's case, teaching courses on comparative American Indian music.

=== Bison ===
Greeted by songs and prayers in the fall of 2014, 38 bison were transferred to the tribe from Badlands National Park. The herd, which has grown to about 215 bison, roams a 500-acre pasture (200 ha) in Bull Hollow.

=== Language ===
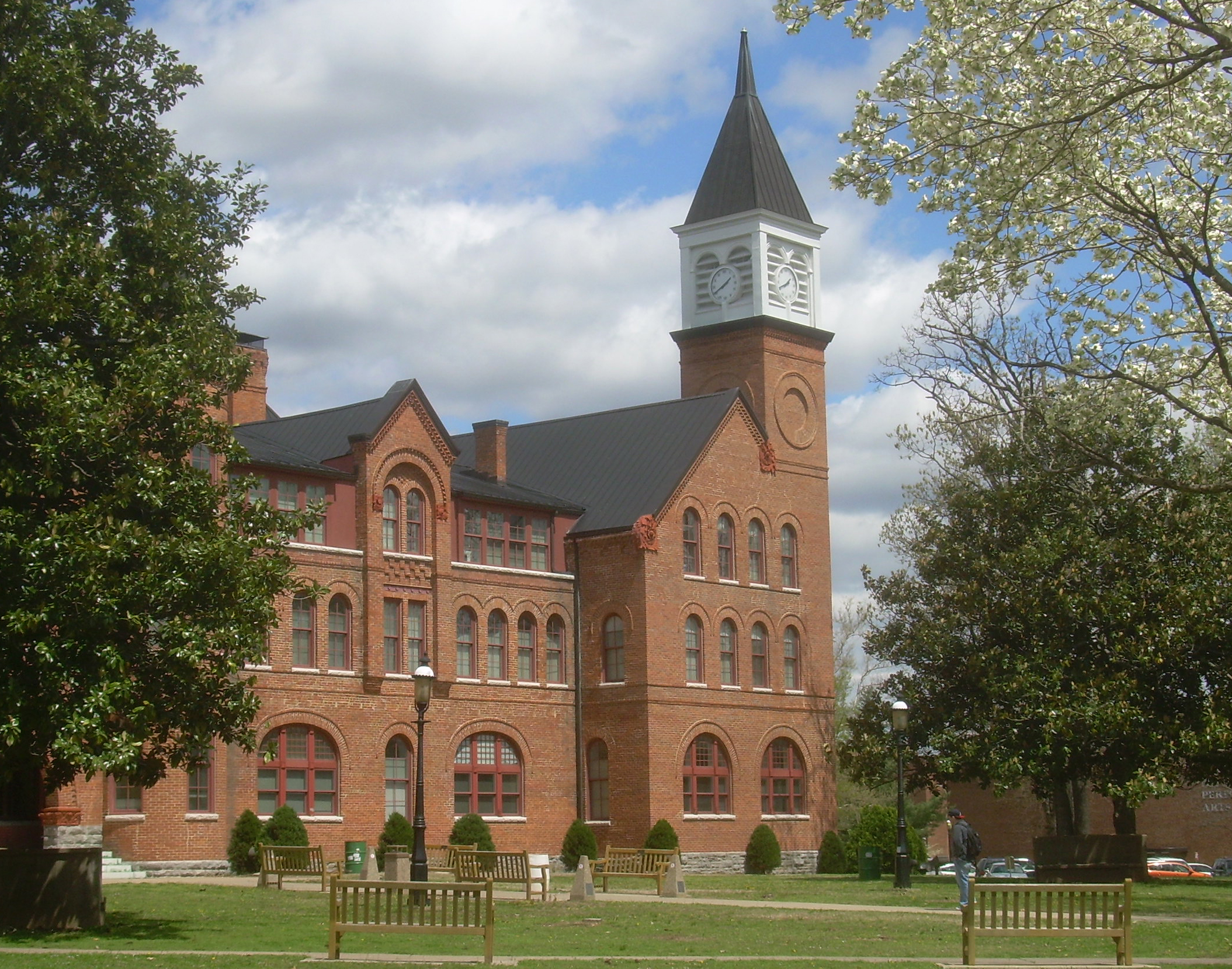
Second Cherokee Female Seminary in Tahlequah (present-day Seminary Hall of Northeastern State University)

The Cherokee Nation instigated a 10-year language preservation plan that involved developing new fluent speakers of the Cherokee language from childhood on up through school immersion programs, as well as a collaborative community effort to use the language at home. This plan was part of an ambitious goal so that in 50 years, 80% or more of the Cherokee people will be fluent in the language. The Cherokee Preservation Foundation has invested $3 million into opening schools, training teachers, and developing curricula for language education, as well as initiating community gatherings where the language can be used.

Formed in 2006, the Kituwah Preservation & Education Program (KPEP) of the Eastern Band of Cherokee Indians, located on the Qualla Boundary in North Carolina, focuses on language immersion programs for children from birth to fifth grade. It is also developing cultural resources for the general public and community language programs to foster use of the Cherokee language among adults.

A Cherokee language immersion school in Tahlequah, Oklahoma educates students from pre-school through eighth grade.

Several universities offer Cherokee as a second language, including the University of Oklahoma, Northeastern State University, and Western Carolina University. Western Carolina University (WCU) has partnered with the federally recognized Eastern Band of Cherokee Indians (EBCI) to promote and restore the language through the school's Cherokee Studies program. It offers classes in and about the language and culture of the Cherokee Indians. WCU and the EBCI have initiated a ten-year language revitalization plan consisting of: (1) a continuation of the improvement and expansion of the EBCI Atse Kituwah Cherokee Language Immersion School, (2) continued development of Cherokee language learning resources, and (3) building a Western Carolina University programs to offer a more comprehensive language training curriculum.

On November 30, 2020, the Cherokee Nation unveiled plans for the new Durbin Feeling Language Center, a converted casino that will house all of the tribe's language programs under one roof in Tahlequah. The project includes five nearby houses in which native speakers will be invited to live, to facilitate interaction between native speakers and others at the facility.

== Indigenous identity fraud ==
On April 9, 2008, the Councils of the Cherokee Nation and the Eastern Band of Cherokee Indians at the Joint Council Meeting held in Catoosa, Oklahoma, passed a resolution: "Opposing Fabricated Cherokee 'Tribes' and 'Indians'". It denounced further state or federal recognition of so-called Cherokee tribes or bands. These tribes committed to exposing and assisting state and federal authorities in eradicating any group that attempts or claims to operate as a government of the Cherokee people. The resolution asked that no public funding from any federal or state government should be expended on behalf of non-federally recognized Cherokee tribes or bands. The Nation stated it would call for a full accounting of all federal monies given to state-recognized, unrecognized or 501(c)(3) charitable organizations that claimed any Cherokee affiliation. It called for federal and state governments to stringently apply a federal definition of "Indian", to include citizens of federally recognized Indian tribes, to prevent non-Indians from selling membership in so-called Cherokee tribes for the purpose of exploiting the Indian Arts and Crafts Act of 1990. In a controversial segment that could affect Cherokee Baptist churches and charitable organizations, the resolution stated that no 501(c)(3) organization, state recognized, or unrecognized groups shall be acknowledged as Cherokee.

The resolution challenged celebrities who claim Cherokee ancestry (Examples are in the "List of self-identified Cherokees".)

"Any individual who is not a member of a federally recognized Cherokee tribe, in academia or otherwise, is hereby discouraged from claiming to speak as a Cherokee, or on behalf of Cherokee citizens, or using claims of Cherokee heritage to advance his or her career or credentials." – Joint Council of the Cherokee Nation and the Eastern Band of the Cherokee Indians

The United Keetoowah Band did not sign or approve the resolution. The Cherokee Nation acknowledges the existence of people of Cherokee descent "... in states such as Arkansas, Kansas, Missouri, and Texas," who are Cherokee by ancestry but who are not considered citizens of the Cherokee Nation.

There are more than 200 groups that we've been able to recognize that call themselves a Cherokee nation, tribe, or band," said Mike Miller, spokesman for the Cherokee Nation. "Only three are federally recognized, but the other groups run the gamut of intent. Some are basically heritage groups – people who have family with Cherokee heritage who are interested in the language and culture, and we certainly encourage that," said Miller. "But the problem is when you have groups that call themselves 'nation', or 'band', or 'tribe', because that implies governance.

In 2008, the Cherokee Nation passed the Cherokee Nation Truth in Advertising for Native Art. This law states that only citizens of the three federally recognized Cherokee tribes can sell their artwork, books, or other creative works as being "Cherokee."

== Media ==
The Cherokee Nation publishes the Cherokee Phoenix, currently a monthly newspaper. The paper has operated nearly continuously since 1828, publishing editions in both English and the Cherokee syllabary (also known as the Sequoyah syllabary). It holds historical significance as both the first newspaper to be published by Native Americans in the United States and the first to be published in a Native American language.

== See also ==
- List of federally recognized tribes
- List of Indian reservations in the United States
- List of Native American tribes in Oklahoma
