= List of Native American artists from Oklahoma =

This list indexes notable Native American artists from Oklahoma, Oklahoma Territory, or Indian Territory. Artists listed in this index were born in, at one time lived in, or presently live in what is now Oklahoma.

== Basket makers ==
- Lena Blackbird, Cherokee Nation, basket weaver
- Mike Dart (born 1977), Cherokee Nation, basket weaver
- Mavis Doering (1929–2007), Cherokee Nation, basket weaver

== Beadwork artists ==
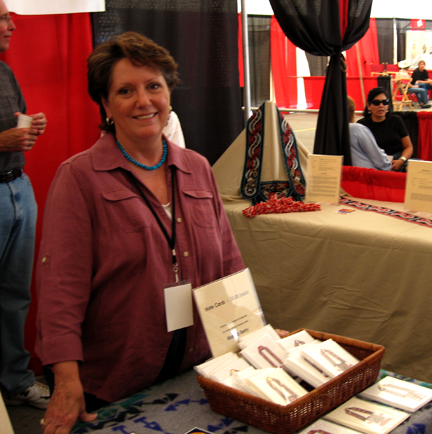
Martha Berry, Cherokee Nation bead artist

- Tahnee Ahtone, Kiowa/Muscogee/Seminole
- Richard Aitson (1953–2022), Kiowa/Kiowa Apache
- Martha Berry, Cherokee Nation
- Les Berryhill, Yuchi/Creek, bead artist
- Vanessa Jennings, Kiowa/Kiowa Apache/Pima, beadwork artist, regalia maker, and tipi maker
- Lois Smoky Kaulaity (1907–1981), Kiowa beadwork artist and painter (one of the Kiowa Six)

== Ceramic artists ==
- Mel Cornshucker (born 1952), Keetoowah Band Cherokee
- Anita Fields (born 1950), Osage/Muscogee
- Bill Glass Jr., Cherokee Nation
- Anna Mitchell, Cherokee Nation (1926–2012), revived the art of Cherokee pottery for the Western Cherokee
- Jane Osti, Cherokee Nation
- Jeri Redcorn, Caddo/Citizen Potawatomi (born ca. 1940)

== Dancers ==
- Yvonne Chouteau (1929–2016), Shawnee Tribe, ballerina
- Rosella Hightower (1920–2008), Choctaw ballerina
- Moscelyne Larkin (1925–2012), Peoria/Shawnee ballerina
- Maria Tallchief (1925–2013), Osage ballerina
- Marjorie Tallchief (born 1926), Osage ballerina

== Diverse cultural artists ==
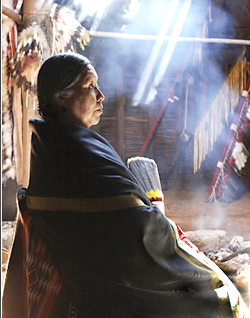
Vanessa Paukeigope Jennings, Kiowa-Pima-Kiowa Apache regalia maker

- Mildred Cleghorn (1910–1997), Fort Sill Apache Tribe, dollmaker
- Vanessa Jennings, Kiowa/Pima, beadwork, customary clothing and tipis
- Alice Littleman (1910–2000), Kiowa, beadwork and regalia maker
- Ardina Moore, Quapaw/Osage, 1930–2022), fashion designer, language instructor, regalia maker, textile artist
- Josephine Myers-Wapp (1912–2014), Comanche, finger weaver, beader, textile artist
- Georgeann Robinson (1917–1985), Osage, traditional apparel, ribbonwork
- Hastings Shade (1941–2010), Cherokee Nation, marble- and gig-maker
- Tommy Wildcat, Cherokee Nation/Muscogee/Natchez, flute maker
- Sandy Fife Wilson (born 1950), Muscogee, basket maker, fingerweaver, shell carver, textile artist, fashion designer

== Draftspeople ==
- Roy Boney Jr., Cherokee Nation, draftsman, painter, animator
- Joseph L. Erb, Cherokee Nation, painter, sculptor, animator
- St. David Pendleton Oakerhater, "Making Medicine" (1847–1931), Southern Cheyenne, ledger artist

== Fashion designers ==
- Ardina Moore, Quapaw/Osage, 1930–2022), fashion designer, language instructor, regalia maker, textile artist
- Lloyd Kiva New (Cherokee Nation, 1916–2002), educator, fashion designer, painter, textile designer
- Wendy Ponca, Osage (born 1960), fashion designer, textile designer
- Margaret Roach Wheeler (Chickasaw/Choctaw, born 1943), weaver

== Installation artists ==
- Edgar Heap of Birds (born 1954), Cheyenne-Arapaho Tribes installation artist, painter, conceptual artist
- Richard Ray Whitman (born 1949), Yuchi/Muscogee Creek Nation, actor, photographer, painter, installation artist
- Holly Wilson (Delaware Nation/Cherokee, born 1968), sculptor, installation artist

== Jewelers ==
- Heidi Bigknife, Shawnee Tribe, jeweler, mixed-media artist, sculptor

== Painters ==
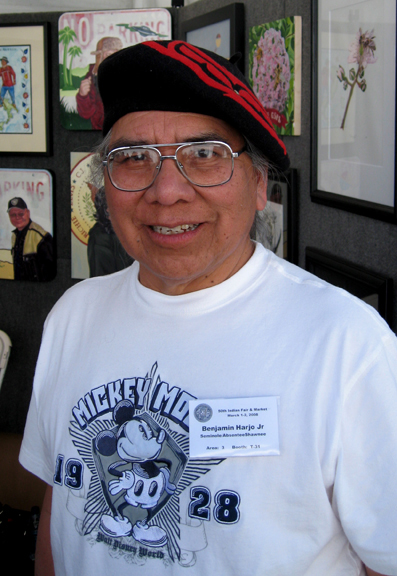
Benjamin Harjo, Jr., Absentee Shawnee/Seminole painter and printmaker

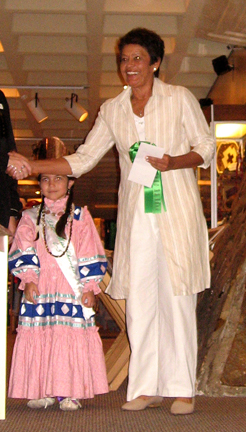
Virginia Stroud, United Keetoowah Band painter

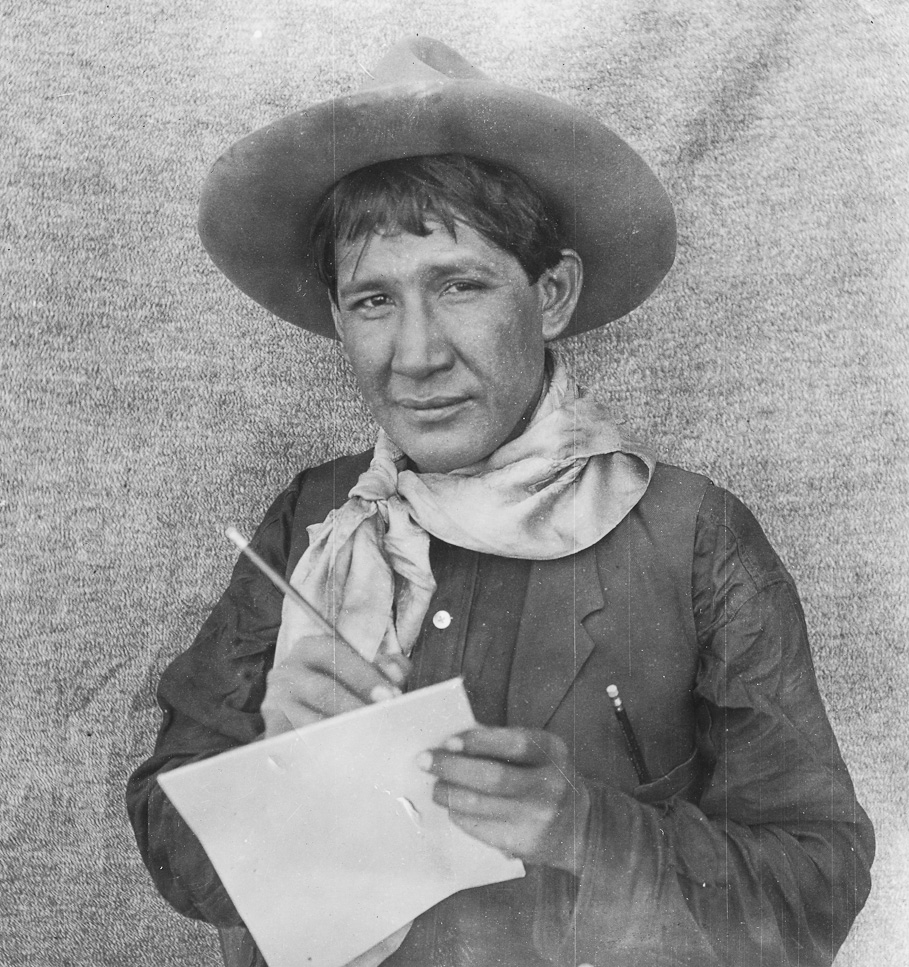
Ernest Spybuck, Absentee Shawnee painter, ca. 1910

- Mary Adair (born 1936), Cherokee Nation painter
- Spencer Asah (c. 1905–1954), Kiowa, painter (one of the Kiowa Six)
- James Auchiah (1906–1975), painter (one of the Kiowa Six)
- Jean Bales (1946–2003), Iowa painter
- Louis W. Ballard (1931–2007), Honga-no-zhe, Quapaw/Cherokee, painter and composer
- Fred Beaver (1911–1976), Muscogee Creek/Seminole, painter
- Archie Blackowl (1911–1967), Cheyenne, painter
- Acee Blue Eagle (1907–1959), Muscogee Creek, painter
- Roy Boney, Jr., Cherokee Nation, draftsman, painter, animator
- Blackbear Bosin (1921–1980), Kiowa/Comanche, painter, sculptor
- Gibson Byrd (1923–2002), Shawnee Tribe, painter
- T.C. Cannon (Pai-doung-u-day), Kiowa/Caddo
- Sherman Chaddlesone (1947–2013), Kiowa, painter
- Adele Collins (Chickasaw, 1908–1996), painter
- Mirac Creepingbear (1947–1990), Kiowa/Pawnee/Arapaho, painter
- Woody Crumbo (1912–1989), Citizen Potawatomi, painter
- Talmadge Davis (1962–2005), Cherokee Nation painter
- Cecil Dick (1915–1992), Cherokee Nation, painter
- Joseph L. Erb, Cherokee Nation, painter, sculptor, animator
- Gina Gray (1954–2014), Osage painter, mixed-media designer
- Franklin Gritts (1915–1996), Keetowah Cherokee, painter
- Enoch Kelly Haney (born 1940), Seminole/Muscogee, painter, sculptor
- Albert Harjo (1937–2019), Muscogee Creek
- Benjamin Harjo Jr. (1945–2923), Absentee Shawnee/Seminole Nation, draftsperson, painter, printmaker
- Sharron Ahtone Harjo (born 1945), Kiowa, painter, ledger artist
- Edgar Heap of Birds (born 1954), Cheyenne-Arapaho Tribes installation artist, painter, conceptual artist
- Valjean McCarty Hessing (1934–2006), Choctaw, painter
- Joan Hill (1930–2020), Muscogee Creek/Cherokee, painter
- Jack Hokeah (1902–1973), Kiowa, painter (one of the Kiowa Six)
- Allan Houser (Chiricahua Apache, 1914–1994), sculptor, painter
- Norma Howard (born 1958), Choctaw Nation/Chickasaw/Mississippi Choctaw, painter
- Sharon Irla (born 1957), Cherokee Nation painter
- Ruthe Blalock Jones (Chu-Lun-Dit, born 1939), Eastern Shawnee/Peoria
- Merlin Little Thunder, Southern Cheyenne, painter
- Jane McCarty Mauldin (1936–1997), Choctaw, painter
- Barbara McAlister (born 1941), Cherokee Nation painter, opera singer
- America Meredith (born 1972), Cherokee Nation painter, printmaker
- Stephen Mopope (1898–1974), Kiowa, painter (one of the Kiowa Six)
- Jackson Narcomey (1942–2012), Muscogee Creek, painter and printmaker
- Doc Tate Nevaquaya (Comanche Nation, 1932–1996), Flatstyle painter and Native American flautist
- Fernando Padilla, Jr. (born 1958), San Felipe Pueblo/Navajo painter and sculptor
- Harvey Pratt (1941–2025), Cheyenne-Arapaho painter, sculptor
- Robert Redbird (1939–2016), Kiowa painter
- Paladine Roye (1946–2001), Ponca painter
- Silver Horn (1860–1940), Kiowa, painter
- Lois Smoky Kaulaity (1907–1981), Kiowa painter (one of the Kiowa Six)
- Ernest Spybuck (1883–1949), Absentee Shawnee painter
- Jimmie Carole Fife Stewart (born 1940), Muscogee Creek "Master Artist" painter and fashion designer
- Virginia Stroud (born 1951), United Keetoowah Band-Muscogee painter
- Carl Sweezy (1881–1953), Arapaho painter
- Dana Tiger (born 1961), Muscogee Creek/Seminole/Cherokee painter
- Jerome Tiger (1941–1967), Muscogee Creek/Seminole painter
- Johnny Tiger, Jr. (1940–2015), Muscogee Creek/Seminole painter and sculptor
- Monroe Tsatoke (1904–1937), Kiowa, painter (one of the Kiowa Six)
- W. Richard “Dick” West, Sr. (1912–1996), Cheyenne painter
- David E. Williams (1933–1985), Kiowa/Tonkawa/Kiowa Apache painter

== Photographers ==
- Jennie Ross Cobb (1881–1959), Cherokee
- Shan Goshorn (1957–2018), Eastern Band Cherokee
- Sharon Irla (born 1957), Cherokee Nation
- Parker McKenzie (1897–1999), Kiowa
- Horace Poolaw (1906–1984), Kiowa
- Richard Ray Whitman (born 1949), Yuchi/Muscogee Creek Nation photographer, painter, installation artist

== Printmakers ==
- T.C. Cannon (Pai-doung-u-day), Kiowa/Caddo
- Benjamin Harjo Jr. (1945–2923), Absentee Shawnee/Seminole Nation, draftsperson, painter, printmaker
- Ruthe Blalock Jones (Chu-Lun-Dit, born 1939), Eastern Shawnee/Delaware/Peoria
- America Meredith (born 1972), Cherokee Nation painter, printmaker
- Jackson Narcomey (born 1942), Muscogee Creek, painter, printmaker

== Sculptors ==
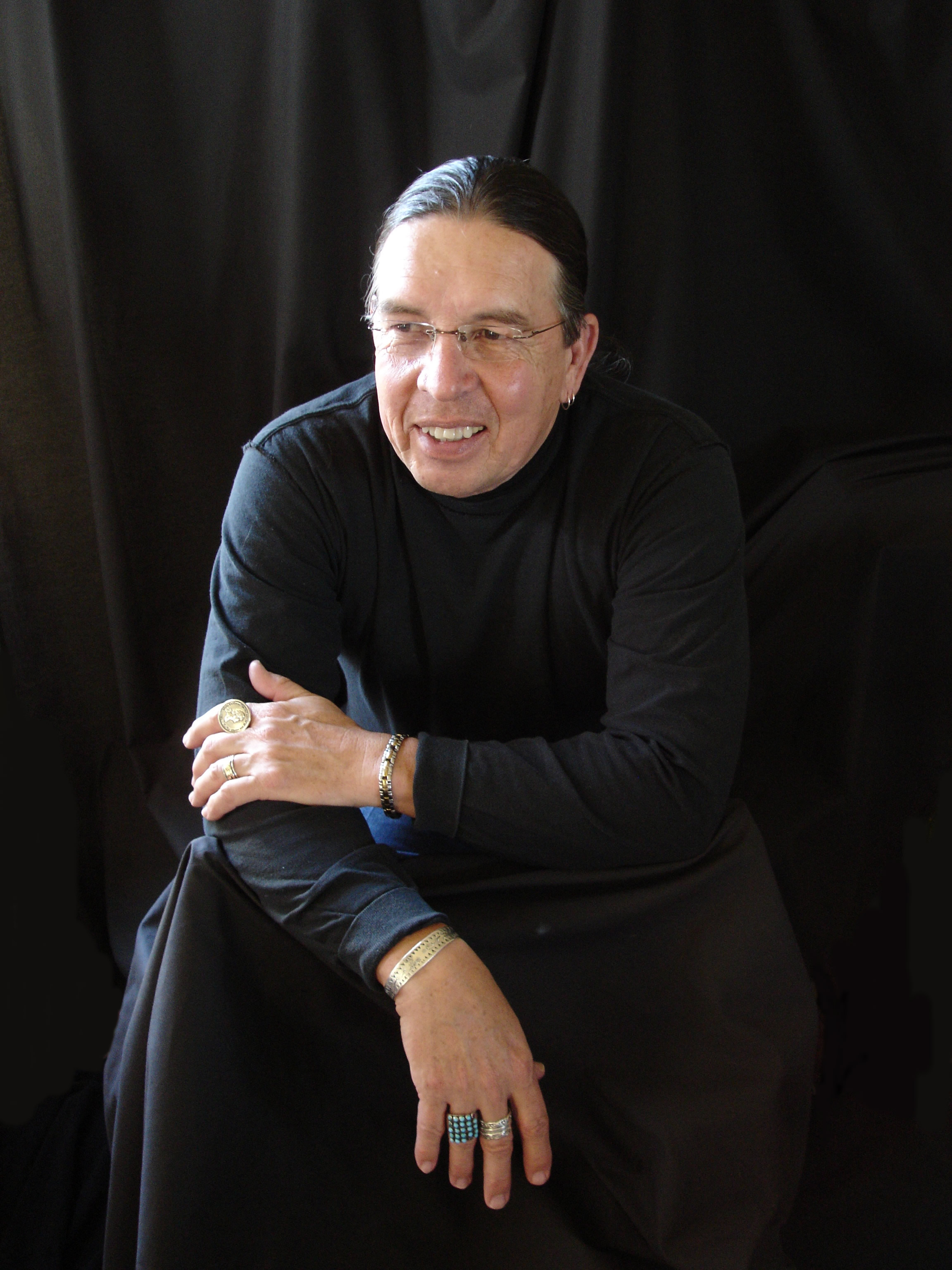
Harvey Pratt, Cheyenne-Arapaho painter and sculptor

- Sara Bates (born 1944), Cherokee Nation, mixed media artist, sculptor
- Blackbear Bosin (1921–1980), Kiowa/Comanche, painter, sculptor
- Joseph L. Erb, Cherokee Nation, painter, sculptor, animator
- Bill Glass Jr., Cherokee Nation
- Enoch Kelly Haney (1940–2022), Seminole/Muscogee, painter, sculptor
- Allan Houser (1914–1994), Chiricahua Apache, sculptor and painter
- Fernando Padilla, Jr. (born 1958), San Felipe Pueblo/Navajo painter and sculptor
- Harvey Pratt (born 1941), Cheyenne-Arapaho painter, sculptor
- Johnny Tiger, Jr. (born 1940), Muscogee/Seminole painter and sculptor
- Holly Wilson (born 1968), Delaware Nation/Cherokee, sculptor, installation artist

== See also ==
- Native American art
- List of Native American artists
- Timeline of Native American art history
- List of indigenous artists of the Americas
- Native Americans in the United States
- Native American women in the arts
- List of writers from peoples indigenous to the Americas
- Native American basketry
- Native American pottery
- Bacone school
- List of Native American tribes in Oklahoma
