= Roy Boney Jr. =

Cherokee artist and language specialist (born 1978)

- ᎧᏂᎦ ᎪᎳᎭ
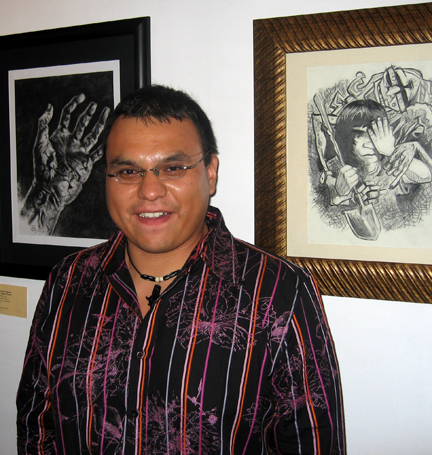
- Boney in 2006
- Born: December 1, 1978 (age 47); Locust Grove, Oklahoma, U.S.
- Citizenship: Cherokee Nation
- Education: BFA Oklahoma State University, MA University of Arkansas
- Known for: Comics, animation, drawing, painting

Roy Boney Jr. (ᎧᏂᎦ ᎪᎳᎭ, born December 1, 1978) is a Cherokee comic artist, fine artist, computer animator and language preservationist from Locust Grove, Oklahoma, a citizen of the Cherokee Nation, and a hereditary member of the Deer Clan. Boney was named a Cherokee National Treasure on 29 August 2024.

== Background ==
Roy Boney Jr. grew up speaking the Cherokee language. He studied at Oklahoma State University, earning a BFA in Graphic Design. He received his Master of Arts degree at the University of Arkansas at Little Rock, where he was a member of the Sequoyah Research Center team and received the Prairie Band Potawatomi Nation Fellowship.

== Cherokee language ==
Boney works as the manager of the Cherokee Nation language program, and previously was as a language media specialist for the Cherokee Nation.

== Visual arts ==
With Matthew Shepherd, Boney created the graphic novel series, Dead Eyes Open, published by Slave Labor Graphics. From a comic background, Boney ventured into fine art drawing and painting. His fine art debut in 2006 yielded the Grand Prize at the Cherokee Heritage Center's Trail of Tears art show and inclusion in the traveling exhibit, Frybread and Roses: The Art of Native American Labor. Several of Boney's paintings are in the permanent collection of the Sequoyah National Research Center.

== Media arts ==
Boney collaborated with Joseph L. Erb at American Indian Resource Center, Inc., teaching animation to Muscogee Creek and Cherokee Children. Their Native language animated films have received numerous awards. Erb and Boney developed an iPhone application for Cherokee language text messaging and are developing Cherokee language social network and video games.

== Writing ==
Boney is a regular contributor to Indian Country Today Media Network and First American Art Magazine.

== See also ==
- List of Native American artists from Oklahoma
- Visual arts by indigenous peoples of the Americas

== External Sources ==
- Oral History Interview with Roy Boney Jr.
