= Southeastern Indian Artists Association =

- Abbreviation: SEIAA
- Pronunciation: see-ya
- Predecessor: GWY Cherokee Artists Association
- Formation: 2006
- Type: Nonprofit
- Tax ID no.: 20-3064851
- Legal status: 501(c)(3) nonprofit
- Purpose: Arts, Cultural Organizations - Multipurpose (A20)
- Location: Tahlequah, Oklahoma, United States
- Fields: Native American art
- Members: More than 100
- President: Mary Lupton
- Vice President: Beth Anderson
- Secretary: Candice Byrd-Boney
- Treasurer: Shelley Patrick
- Website: seiaa.org

The Southeastern Indian Artists Association (SEIAA) is an intertribal Native American nonprofit arts organization headquartered in northeastern Oklahoma.

The group promotes and protects the interests of Native American artists, particularly Southeastern Woodlands. Group members are verified citizens of federally recognized tribes in compliance with the Indian Arts and Crafts Act.

== Founding ==
The group was formed officially in 2004 (22 years ago) as the Cherokee Artists Association after Native American artists came together and decided that they needed to begin helping each other to be successful artists in the art world. Many artists travel to Santa Fe Indian Market, Cherokee Art Market, and various other national Native art events. The group used to operate a cooperative art gallery. Members included Martha Berry, Mike Dart, Bill Glass Jr., Demos Glass, Sharon Irla, Jane Osti, Troy Jackson, and Shan Goshorn.

The Cherokee Nation provided the CAA a grant to expand their online web gallery. Sharon Irla, CAA Executive Officer says of the group, "These artists preserve our tribal culture and deserve to have their works represented in mainstream media."

== Administration ==
The 2025–2026 SEIAA officers are:

- President – Mary Lupton (Cherokee Nation)
- Vice President – Beth Anderson (Cherokee Nation)
- Secretary – Candice Byrd-Boney (Quapaw, Osage, and Cherokee Nation)
- Treasurer – Shelley Patrick (Muscogee Nation)
- At-Large #1 – America Meredith (Cherokee Nation)
- At-Large #2 – Robbie Atabaigi (Absentee Shawnee)
- At-Large #3 – Diana Folsom (Choctaw Nation)

== Activities ==
The SEIAA now promotes artists from any Indigenous people of the Southeastern Woodlands. The organization hosts and promotes groups exhibitions, such as Indigenous Gender Identity (2022).
