= Ralph T. Coe =

American art historian

Ralph Tracy "Ted" Coe (August 27, 1929 – September 14, 2010) was a notable art collector and scholar, best known for developing modern appreciation of Native American art. "He was kind of the beginning player, enormously significant in the growth of appreciation of Native American art in the 20th century", noted a curator from the Metropolitan Museum of Art. His collection of over 2,000 objects of Indigenous art form the basis of the Ralph T. Coe Center for the Arts collection holdings.

== Biography ==
Coe grew up in Cleveland, Ohio, where his parents and sister were also involved in the art world, with his father an art collector specializing in Impressionist art as a trustee of the Cleveland Museum of Art. He earned a bachelor's degree at Oberlin College, and a master's at Yale University, both in art history. At Yale he worked for John Pope Hennessy as a research assistant. He worked at the Victoria and Albert Museum in London and then at the National Gallery of Art in Washington, D.C. He was hired by what was then the Nelson Gallery of Art as curator of painting and sculpture in 1959.

His lifelong interest in Native American art was sparked serendipitously in 1955, when he happened upon a Northwest coast totem pole standing in a shop on Lexington Avenue in Manhattan. This chance encounter led to an interest in collecting Native American art, over the years amassing a collection of more than 1,000 pieces that dated from prehistoric times to the 20th century. Included in Coe's collection were kachina dolls, war bonnets, ceramic pieces and beaded garments. The material he found was located by crisscrossing the country to visit Indian reservations across the United States, where he acquired pieces and learned about the history and significance of the articles he collected. In 1976, an exhibition based on his work titled Sacred Circles: 2,000 Years of North American Indian Art opened at the Hayward Gallery in London. The exhibit was relocated to the Nelson-Atkins Museum of Art in Kansas City, Missouri, in 1977, where Coe served as the museum's director until 1982. After leaving his position as museum director, Coe said he felt liberated, exchanging "a pinstripe suit for a pair of jeans" and having "the Indian world became the real world" to him, "a beguiling world of color and visual excitement, of pungent and humorous people". A 1986 exhibition that debuted at the American Museum of Natural History was titled Lost and Found Traditions: Native American Art, 1965-1985, focusing on works of contemporary artists, which Coe developed as part of what The New York Times called "his determination to show that Indian art is a living tradition". An exhibition at the Metropolitan Museum of Art that included some 200 items from his collection opened in 2003, titled The Responsive Eye: Ralph T. Coe and the Collecting of American Indian Art. Coe donated significant portions of his collection to the Met in 2003.

Coe also influenced the work of other collectors, including Marion and Henry W. Bloch's well-regarded collection of Impressionist works and Eugene V. Thaw. Bloch said that he "would never have had a collection if not for Ted," and credited Coe with having guided the selection of virtually every piece in their collection.

Coe died at age 81 on September 14, 2010, at his home in Santa Fe, New Mexico.

== Significant exhibitions curated ==
- "The Imagination of Primitive Man: A Survey of the Arts of the Non-Literate Peoples of the World" The Nelson Gallery and Atkins Museum, Kansas City, MO, 1962. Bulletin, Vol. IV No. 1
- Sacred Circles: 2,000 Years of North American Indian Art (opened at Hayward Gallery, London, 1976) ISBN 0-295-95584-8
- Lost and Found Traditions: Native American Art, 1965-1985 (opened at American Museum of Natural History, 1986) ISBN 0-295-96699-8. Contemporary Native American artists.
- The Responsive Eye: Ralph T. Coe and the Collecting of American Indian Art (opened at the Metropolitan Museum of Art, 2003) ISBN 0-300-10187-2.

== Ralph T. Coe Center for the Arts ==
Ralph T. Coe Center for the Arts

In 2007, the Ralph T. Coe Center for the Arts was established in Santa Fe, New Mexico as a not for profit institution devoted to increasing educational and public awareness of Indigenous art and culture. The collection includes over 2,000 objects of Indigenous art from cultures throughout the world. The center has a partnership with First American Art Magazine. In 2020, the center began discussions with America Meredith regarding programing.

== Books ==
- Ralph T. Coe and the Collecting of American Indian Art
