= Jackson Wink MMA Academy =

Mixed martial arts gym based in Albuquerque, New Mexico

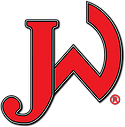
- Est.: 1992; 34 years ago
- Founded by: Greg Jackson
- Primary owners: Greg Jackson; Mike Winkeljohn
- Primary trainers: Greg Jackson; Israel Martinez; Mike Winkeljohn; Roberto Alencar
- Past titleholders: Andrei Arlovski; B.J. Penn; Carlos Condit; Frank Mir; Georges St-Pierre; Holly Holm; Jon Jones; Rashad Evans
- Training facilities: Albuquerque, New Mexico, U.S.
- Website: Official website

Jackson Wink MMA Academy (formerly known as Jackson's Submission Fighting) is a mixed martial arts gym based in Albuquerque, New Mexico. The gym has been featured in several sports documentaries and has been called one of the best MMA gyms in the world by various MMA magazines.

== History ==
Gaidojutsu
- Focus: Hybrid
- Hardness: Full-contact
- Country of origin: United States
- Creator: Greg Jackson; Mike Winkeljohn
- Parenthood: Boxing, Kickboxing, Collegiate wrestling, Judo
- Olympic sport: No

In 1992, after graduating from Rio Grande High School, Greg Jackson founded his own martial art, Gaidojutsu, which combines rudimentary techniques from Boxing, Kickboxing, and Wrestling with basic joint locks from Judo. His school officially turned into an MMA school in 2000. The gym started gaining notoriety when Diego Sanchez won the first Ultimate Fighter in 2005.

In 2007 Jackson teamed up with long time friend and collaborator, and fellow martial artist, Mike Winkeljohn to create the academy as it stands today. Winkeljohn is a former professional kickboxer with a record of 25–7–2 who captured two International Sport Karate Association Championships and one Muay Thai world title.

In December 2019, Jackson and Winkeljohn announced they would begin entertaining naming rights offers for their training facility Albuquerque, New Mexico. However, a price wasn't given. Jackson also announced they will begin offering mixed martial arts fans a chance to travel to Albuquerque, New Mexico and train like his gym's fighters. He said prices for personalized MMA packages would vary and stays could last a week to two weeks at a time.

Due to COVID-19, in March 2020, Jackson Wink MMA Academy announced it would be adjusting its training. This includes moving to "more striking-based training" to curtail contact among fighters as well as preventing anyone who was sick or may have had exposure to COVID-19 from training at the facility.

== Incidents ==
=== Fighters ===
Due to the large size of the gym, there have been occasions where fighters would be booked to fight against each other professionally. This has caused internal conflicts within the gym.

In March 2011, Rashad Evans announced that he was done training at Jackson-Wink MMA Academy. Originally, Evans was slated to fight Maurício Rua for the UFC Light Heavyweight title at UFC 128. However Evans injured his knee during training and was replaced by Jon Jones, who was from the same gym and would eventually go on to defeat Rua to win the title. When Evans and Jones were slated to fight, the gym decided to side with Jones and corner him at UFC 145. Evans considered this as the gym turning its back on its older fighters in favor of younger ones. Evans would eventually move to the Blackzilians.

In August 2018, Donald Cerrone left Jackson-Wink MMA Academy to open his own training center on his ranch. It all came after Cerrone was signed to fight his fellow welterweight, Mike Perry, who was a newcomer to the same gym. Cerrone requested that his coaches solely focus on him due to his long-standing status as a Jackson-Wink fighter. However, according to Cerrone on The Joe Rogan Experience podcast, Winkeljohn told him the gym decided to side with Perry which angered Cerrone. Cerrone went on to criticize the modern-day Jackson-Wink MMA Academy, citing problems he has with the day-to-day running of the gym as one of the reasons behind his decision to open his own training center on his ranch – something he also feels caused increased tension.

Other examples include Georges St-Pierre defending his title against Carlos Condit, as well as Andrei Arlovski being booked to fight against Alistair Overeem.

In October 2021, Jon Jones was banned from the Jackson Wink MMA Academy as a result of his arrest stemming from domestic violence against his fiancée.

== Notable fighters ==
(Bold denotes current and past UFC champions)

- Adlan Amagov (UFC)
- Ali Bagautinov (UFC) - Former UFC Flyweight Title Challenger
- Alistair Overeem (UFC) - Former Strikeforce Heavyweight Champion, 2010 K-1 Grand Prix Champion
- **Andrei Arlovski** (UFC) - Former UFC 2-Time Heavyweight Champion
- **B.J. Penn** (UFC)- Former UFC Lightweight Champion and UFC Welterweight Champion
- **Carlos Condit** (UFC) - Former Welterweight Title Contender and Challenger, Former UFC Interim Welterweight Champion, Former WEC Welterweight Champion
- Claressa Shields (PFL) - Two time Olympic Boxing Gold Medalist, undisputed boxing female middleweight champion from 2019 to September 2020
- Clay Guida (UFC) - Former Strikeforce Lightweight Champion
- Cub Swanson (UFC)
- Derek Brunson (UFC)
- Diego Sanchez (UFC) - UFC Lightweight Title Challenger, TUF 1 Middleweight Winner
- Donald Cerrone (UFC) - Former WEC Lightweight Title Challenger
- Erik Perez (UFC)
- **Frank Mir** (UFC)- Former UFC Heavyweight Champion
- **Georges St-Pierre** (UFC) - Former UFC Welterweight and Middleweight Champion, 10 title defenses
- Gina Carano (Strikeforce)
- **Holly Holm** (UFC) - Former UFC Women's Bantamweight Champion
- Joe Stevenson (RFA) - Former UFC Lightweight Title Challenger, TUF 2 Welterweight Winner
- John Dodson (UFC) - Former UFC Flyweight Title Challenger, TUF 14 Bantamweight Winner
- **Jon Jones** (UFC) Former 2 Time UFC Light Heavyweight Champion and UFC Heavyweight Champion
- Josh Hokit (UFC)
- Julie Kedzie (Retired)
- Keith Jardine (UFC) - Former Strikeforce Middleweight Title Challenger
- Kyle Noke (UFC)
- Lando Vannata (UFC)
- Leonard Garcia (Retired) - Former WEC Featherweight Title Challenger
- Michelle Waterson (UFC) - Former Invicta Atomweight Champion
- Nate Marquardt (UFC) - Former Strikeforce Welterweight Champion, Former UFC Middleweight Title Challenger, Former Pancrase Middleweight Champion
- Omari Akhmedov (UFC)
- **Rashad Evans** (UFC) - Former UFC Light Heavyweight Champion, The Ultimate Fighter season 2 winner
- Ray Borg (UFC)
- Roger Huerta (One FC)
- Rustam Khabilov (UFC)
- Sarah Kaufman (UFC) - Former Strikeforce Women's Bantamweight Champion
- Tara LaRosa
- Hamza Hamry (BYB EXTREME)
- Tim Kennedy (UFC) - (Retired) Former Strikeforce Middleweight Title Challenger
- Tim Means (UFC)
- Tony Ferguson (UFC) - Former UFC Interim Lightweight Champion
- Vitaly Minakov (Bellator MMA) - Former Bellator Heavyweight Champion, 4-Time World Sambo Champion +100 kg
- Yoshihiro Akiyama (UFC)

== Awards ==
- World MMA Awards
- 2015 Gym of the Year
- 2011 Coach of the Year: Greg Jackson
- 2010 Coach of the Year: Greg Jackson
- 2009 Gym of the Year
- 2009 Coach of the Year: Greg Jackson

== See also ==
- List of professional MMA training camps
