= Pamela Jumper-Thurman =

American epidemiologist, academic, and researcher

- Born: Pamela Sue Jumper; September 1, 1947 (age 79)
- Education: Oklahoma State University
- Occupations: Epidemiologist, researcher, author
- Spouse: Gary Oliver Thurman (m. 1971)

Pamela Jumper-Thurman (born Pamela Sue Jumper; September 1, 1947) is an American academic, epidemiologist, researcher, evaluator, and grantsmanship consultant. She is best known for her role in the development of the Community Readiness Model and as co-editor of the legacy book Cherokee National Treasures: In Their Own Words. She is a citizen of the Cherokee Nation and a jeweler.

Jumper-Thurman is the President and co-owner of Council Oak Training and Evaluations, Inc., with Barbara Plested.

== Career ==
Jumper-Thurman began her academic career working as a research associate at the Tri-Ethnic Center for Prevention Research at Colorado State University (CSU) and moved to the position of senior research scientist. She later worked as senior research scientist in the CSU's ethnic studies department. There she also served as the project. director of the National Center for Community and Organizational Readiness.

She has worked on cultural issues utilizing participatory community research, prevention of Alcohol, Tobacco and Other Drugs (ATOD), methamphetamine treatment and prevention, prevention of violence and victimization, rural women's concerns, prevention and education about HIV/AIDS, opioid use, COVID-19, and solvent abuse. She is one of the primary developers of the Community Readiness Model, which assists communities in creating positive community change around a specific issue by facilitating their progression through a series of nine stages of readiness. The model has been used extensively in Native American communities for a variety of social challenges. It has also been used by many other races. The World Health Organization has also adapted the model to fund five countries to address the issue of child maltreatment. The model has been used extensively throughout the world.

Jumper-Thurman assisted the First Nations people throughout Canada to utilize the Community Readiness Model in various projects and worked with First Lady Laura Bush and First Lady of Ohio, Hope Taft, as a trainer on Community Readiness for the Helping America's Youth campaign and the Building Bridges campaign, respectively.

She has served as a member of the national Center for Substance Abuse Treatment (CSAT) Advisory Council and Rosalynn Carter's Caregiving Panels and has served as Principal Investigator/Co-Principal Investigator for 18 federally funded grants and evaluated more than 100 federally funded projects throughout the United States.

== Publications ==
Jumper-Thurman has co-authored numerous papers. Some of her publications are as follows:

- Jumper-Thurman, P., Edwards, R. W., & Plested, B. (2003). Ethnic and Cultural Considerations in Caregiving. In Caregiving and Mental Health. The Rosalynn Carter Institute for Human Development, Georgia Southwestern College. Americus: GA.
- Jumper-Thurman, P., Edwards, R. W., & Plested, B. (2003). Honoring the differences: Using community readiness to create culturally valid community interventions. In G. Bernal, J. E. Trimble, A. K. Burlew, & F. T. L. Leong (Eds.), Handbook of racial & ethnic minority psychology (pp. 591–607). Thousand Oaks, CA: Sage.
- Jumper-Thurman, P., Plested, B.A., Edwards, R.W., Foley, R., & Burnside, M. (2003). Community Readiness: The Journey to Community Healing. Journal of Psychoactive Drugs, 35(1), 27–31.
- Jumper-Thurman, P. (2000). In D. Bigfoot (Ed.), Community Readiness: A promising model for community healing. (Native American topic specific monograph series). The University of Oklahoma Health Sciences Center. Washington, DC: U.S. Department of Justice.
- Jumper-Thurman, P., Bates, S.C., & Plested, B. (2000). Solvent use, school attendance, gender and ethnicity. Prevention Researcher, 7(3), 10–11.
- Jumper-Thurman, P. & Plested, B. (2000). Community readiness: A model for healing in a rural Alaskan community. The Family Psychologist, (Summer), 8–9.
- Model, Curricula Development and Other Publications
- Oetting, E.R., Plested, B.A., Jumper-Thurman, P., & Edward, R.W. (1994) Community readiness model (CRM).
- Thurman, P.J. & Young, A.E. (1988). The Medicine Wheel Curriculum – A Prevention Approach to Substance Abuse. Cherokee Nation of Oklahoma, Tahlequah, Oklahoma.
- Thurman, P.J. & Young, A.E. (1988). Journey to Fitness, A Chemical Prevention Curriculum for Kickapoo Children. American Indian Resource Center, Tulsa, Oklahoma.
- Thurman, P.J. & Plested, B.A. (1990). Presented testimony to Senate Select Committee on Child Abuse Prevention on Indian Reservations for the American Psychological Association, Washington, D.C.
- Thurman, P.J. & Plested, B.A. (1990). Presented testimony to the House Select Committee on Maternal Child Health Issues among American Indians, Washington, D.C.
- Thurman, P.J. (1990). Presented testimony to Senate Select Committee on Indian Affairs, Mental Health Issues of American Indians, Washington, D.C.
- Original Videos/DVDs
- Jumper-Thurman, P., Plested, B., & Edwards, R. (2005). Community Readiness. Ft. Collins, Colorado: Tri Ethnic Center for Prevention Research: Colorado State University (Videotape and discussion guide); Co-Script writer, Co-Executive Producer, and co-director.

She has also created and produced 20 PSAs targeted at HIV/AIDS prevention, testing, and awareness while serving as the lead for the Annual Launch of National Native HIV/AIDS Awareness Day campaign, and has held over 1,500 presentations, keynote speeches, and workshops in the U.S., the U.S. territories, Israel, Italy, Wales, Ireland, and Canada.

Jumper-Thurman is the co-editor and author of Cherokee National Treasures: In Their Own Words, a collection of biographical information and quotations from Cherokee National Treasures.
