= Jackson Narcomey =

American painter

Jackson Leon Narcomey (January 25, 1942 – March 22, 2012) was a Muscogee Creek painter and printmaker from Oklahoma. He was born in Tahlequah, Oklahoma. His parents were the Rev. Raymond (1908–1962) and Frances Narcomey (1910–2001), who were both fullblood Creeks. Narcomey grew up in Eufaula, Oklahoma, located in the Muscogee Nation. In high school, he returned to Tahlequah to attend Sequoyah Indian School. There he studied studio arts under Riley White. His classes included very influential instruction in serigraphy.

Upon graduation, Narcomey joined the U.S. Air Force, serving as an on-board flight mechanic. He was honorably discharged after two years of service and returned to Oklahoma and the Muscogee Nation.

Beginning in the 1970s, Narcomey developed his art career in earnest. He painted in the Bacone School flat style as well as non-objective abstraction and sculpture.

His paintings have won state and national awards and today are in private and museum collections. Narcomey also pursued a career as a commercial screen printer.

He died in Muskogee in 2012.

== See also ==
- List of Native American artists
- List of Native American artists from Oklahoma
- Muscogee Creek Nation
