= Durbin Feeling =

Cherokee linguist (1946–2020)

- ᏫᎵ ᏚᎥᎢᏅ
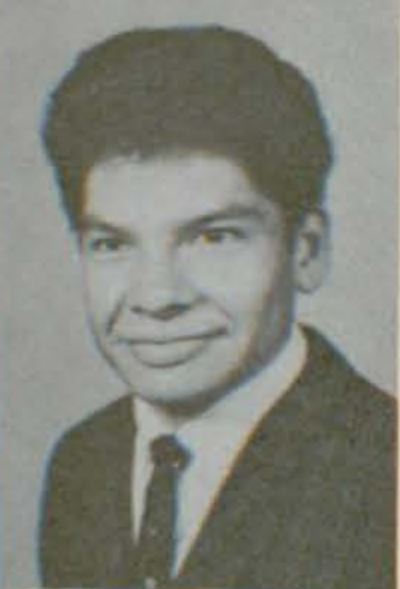
- Durbin Feeling, 1964
- Born: April 2, 1946; Mayes County, Oklahoma, US
- Died: August 19, 2020 (aged 74); Tahlequah, Oklahoma, US
- Education: Bacone College; Northeastern State University; University of California, Irvine
- Occupations: Linguist, educator

Durbin Duran Feeling (Cherokee: ᏫᎵ ᏚᎥᎢᏅ, romanized: Wili Duvinv; April 2, 1946 – August 19, 2020) was a Cherokee Nation linguist who wrote the primary Cherokee–English dictionary in 1975. He is considered the greatest modern contributor to the preservation of the endangered Cherokee language.

== Early life and education ==
Feeling was born on April 2, 1946, to Jeff and Elizabeth Feeling in the Little Rock community east of Locust Grove, Oklahoma. Cherokee was his first language; he learned English when he was in the first grade. He began to read the Cherokee syllabary when he was 12 years old.

Feeling graduated from Chilocco Indian School (a Native American boarding school) in 1964 and earned an associate's degree from Bacone College in 1966. He was drafted into the Army in 1967 and served as a door gunner during the Vietnam War. He began to write in the Cherokee syllabary when corresponding with his mother while he was in Vietnam. He was awarded a Purple Heart, and he was honorably discharged in 1970.

Feeling earned a bachelor's degree in journalism from Northeastern State University in 1979 and a master's degree in social sciences from the University of California, Irvine in 1992.

== Career ==
Durbin began his work with the Cherokee language when he returned from Vietnam. In 1975, Feeling co-wrote the first Cherokee–English dictionary. It remains the "standard publication for Cherokee language reference".

Feeling taught Cherokee at universities including the University of Oklahoma and the University of Tulsa. He authored or contributed to many books and research articles about Cherokee. His materials for Cherokee language learners remain widely used, and many Cherokee language teachers learned directly from Feeling.

Feeling worked for the Cherokee Nation from 1976 to 2020, including in its language translation and technology department. In the 1980s, he added the Cherokee syllabary to a word processor. He also contributed to the addition of the Cherokee syllabary to Unicode, which allows it to be widely available on computers and smartphones.

== Personal life and death ==
Feeling was a Baptist lay minister.

He died August 19, 2020.

== Influence and legacy ==
For his contributions to the preservation of the Cherokee language and Cherokee culture, Feeling was named a Cherokee National Treasure by the Cherokee Nation. He was also awarded an honorary doctorate by Ohio State University. Cherokee Nation Principal Chief Chuck Hoskin, Jr. has described Feeling as "a modern-day Sequoyah" (referring to the creator of the Cherokee syllabary) and said that "[e]verything we are doing for language revitalization is because of Durbin.” In 2019, the Cherokee Nation chose Feeling as the first signatory of the Cherokee Language Speakers Roll.

Feeling is the namesake of the Cherokee Nation's language learning center (the Durbin Feeling Language Center) and a 2022 amendment of the Native American Languages Act for promoting the use of indigenous languages in the United States.

The Sam Noble Museum holds the Durbin Feeling Collection, containing his extensive Cherokee-language materials, including letters written in Cherokee to and from members of Feeling’s family.

== Selected works ==
- Feeling, Durbin. Cherokee–English Dictionary. Tahlequah: Cherokee Nation, 1975.
- Feeling, Durbin. A structured approach to learning the basic inflections of the Cherokee verb. Neff Publishing Company, 1994.
- Tuyl, Charles D. Van; Durbin Feeling (1994). An Outline of Basic Verb Inflections of Oklahoma Cherokee. Indian University Press. ISBN 978-0-940392-07-6.
- Pulte, William, and Durbin Feeling. "Morphology in Cherokee Lexicography." Making dictionaries: Preserving indigenous languages of the Americas (2002): 60.
- Feeling, Durbin, ed. See-say-write: Method of Teaching the Cherokee Language. Cherokee Nation, Indian Adult Education, 2002.
- Feeling, Durbin, et al. "A handbook of the Cherokee verb: a preliminary study." Tahlequah, Okla.: Cherokee Heritage Center (2003).
- Feeling, Durbin, et al. "Why revisit published data of an endangered language with native speakers? An illustration from Cherokee." Language Documentation & Conservation 4 (2010): 1-21.
- Feeling, Durbin; Christiansen, Lisa Christine (2015). Cherokee Hymn Book. Penguin International Publishing. ISBN 978-0-692-47367-2.
- Herrick, Dylan, Marcellino Berardo, Durbin Feeling, et al. "Collaborative documentation and revitalization of Cherokee tone." Language Documentation & Conservation 9 (2015): 12-31.
- Feeling, Durbin. Cherokee Narratives: A Linguistic Study. University of Oklahoma Press, 2018.
