= Cherokee National Treasure =

Distinction created in 1988 by the Cherokee Nation

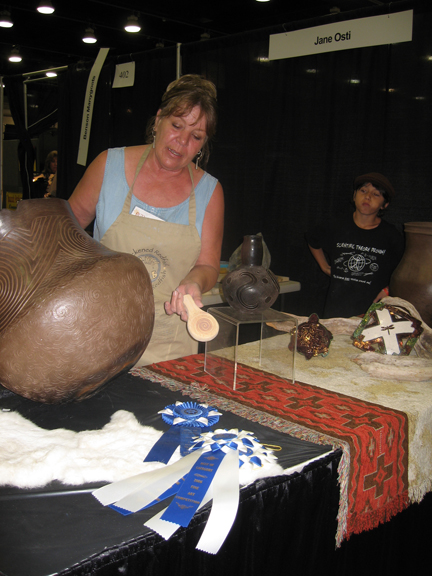
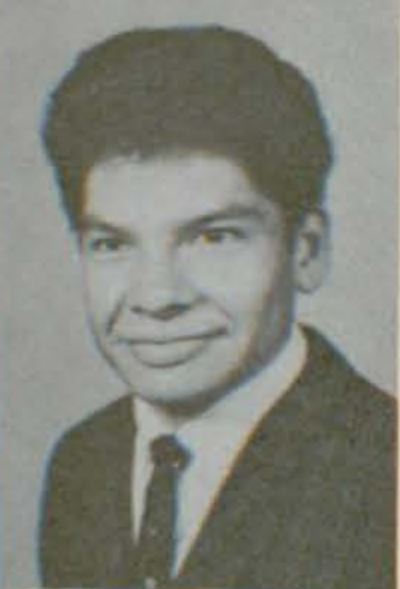
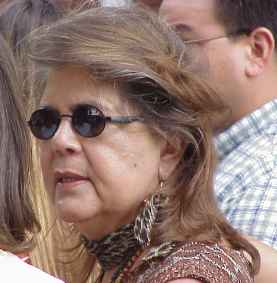
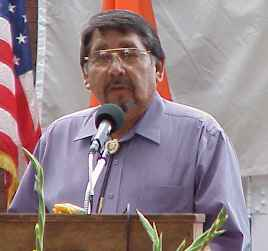
Several people designated as Cherokee National Treasures. Clockwise from top left: Jane Osti, Durbin Feeling, Hastings Shade, Wilma Mankiller

Cherokee National Treasure is a distinction created in 1988 by the Cherokee Nation to recognize people who have made significant contributions to the preservation of the tribe's art, language, and culture.

The tribe published a biographical overview of these cultural bearers, Cherokee National Treasures: In Their Own Words, co-edited by Shawna Morton-Cain and Pamela Jumper-Thurman in 2017.

== List of recipients ==
List of Cherokee National Treasures
Name	Year Inducted	Birthday (Note: Birthdays for all Cherokee National Treasures up to 2017 are from the "Cherokee National Treasures" book.)	Death Day	Reason for Induction
Alex England	1988	September 3, 1903	Before 2017 (Note: While specific death dates are unavailable, the book "Cherokee National Treasures" confirms their death.)	Bow making
Todum Hair	1988	February 1, 1917	2010	Gig making
Anna Sixkiller Mitchell	1988	October 16, 1926	March 3, 2012	Pottery
Lyman Vann	1988 (posthumously)	May 22, 1907	June 15, 1985	Bow making
William Cabbagehead	1989			Blowgun/Darts
Stella Livers	1990	April 20, 1911	1994	Basketry
Knokovtee Scott	1990	February 10, 1951	December 12, 2019	Carving
Lucille Hair	1990	April 2, 1917	October 11, 2012	Weaving
Lorene Drywater	1990	June 19, 1932	July 30, 2021	Traditional clothing sewing
Mattie Wildcat Drum	1990	February 26, 1920	1991	Weaving
Rogers McLemore	1990	September 18, 1912	Before 2017	Weaving
Hester Chair Guess	1990	September 15, 1915	Before 2017	Weaving
Ella Mae Blackbear	1990	August 23, 1930		Basketry
Clarence Downing	1990			Carving
Ruth England	1990			Traditional clothing
Mary Foreman	1990	September 24, 1926	Before 2021	Basketry
Sally Lacy	1990	September 11, 1920	Before 2017	Basketry
Thomas Muskrat	1990			Carving
Jennie Sapp	1990	February 21, 1923	Before 2017	Basketry
Maxine Stick	1990			Basketry
Hastings Shade	1991	May 20, 1941	February 9, 2010	Carving/Gig making, one-term deputy chief of the Cherokee Nation
Wendell Cochran	1991			Traditional clothing
Alan Herrin	1991			Bow making
Dorothy Ice	1991			Weaving
Eunice O'Field	1991			Basketry/Weaving
Scott Rackliff	1991	May 29, 1923	1994	Flintknapping/Carving
Anna Sixkiller-Huckaby	1991			Basketry
Nancy Smith	1991			Turtleshell Shackles
Eva Smith	1991			Turtleshell Shackles
Betty Jo Smith	1991	March 26, 1931		Traditional Cooking
Edith Catcher Knight	1992		2016	Traditional clothing
Minnie Handle Jumper	1992	July 25, 1922	Before 2017	Doll making
John Ketcher	1992	June 5, 1922	October 17, 2011	Weaving
George Fourkiller	1992	December 8, 1907	Before 2017	Basketry
Thelma Forrest	1992	1939/1940	November 17, 2024	Basketry
Betty Scraper Garner	1993	February 23, 1924	June 1997	Basketry
Vivian Bush	1993			Turtle shell shackles
Jess Oosahwee	1993			Blowgun/Darts
David Neugin	1994	August 26, 1920		Bow making
Luther "Toby" Hughes	1994			Carving
Tom Webber Wildcat	1995	August 11, 1922	2008	Turtleshell Shackles
Vivian Garner Cottrell	1995	May 24, 1959		Basketry
Lena Blackbird	1996			Basketry
Richard Rowe	1996			Carving
William Foster	1997	August 13, 1920		Bow making
Nadine Wilbourn	1997			Basketry
Noel Timothy Grayson	1998			Bow making/Flintknapping
Lee Foreman	1999	October 19, 1928		Marble making
Mildred Justice Ketcher	1999	November 26, 1922		Basketry
Bessie Russell	1999			Basketry
Albert Wofford	1999	July 2, 1929		Gig making/Carving
Wyona Dreadfulwater	2000			Loomweaving
Marie A. Proctor	2000			Basketry
Pollie Whitekiller	2001	September 18, 1917	Before 2017	Quilting
Willie Jumper Sr.	2001 (posthumously)	March 31, 1911	August 1977	Stickball Sticks
Margaret Wilson	2001			Quilting
Wanna Lou Barton	2002		2010	Turtle shell shackles
Jim Buckhorn	2002	September 13, 1943	September 28, 2020	Bow making
Linda Lou Mouse Hansen	2002	March 25, 1925	Before 2017	Basketry
Sam Lee Still	2002	January 28, 1925	Before 2017	Wood Carving
Lizzie Jane Whitekiller	2002			Hand Sewn Quilting
Kathryn Kelley	2003	June 12, 1930 or December 6, 1930	June 20, 2021	Traditional basketry
Rosie Chewie	2003			Basketry
Kathy Mae VanBuskirk	2004			Basketry
Perry Lynn VanBuskirk	2004			Bowmaking
Jane Osti	2005			Pottery
Shawna Morton Cain	2006			Basketry
Rachel Michelle Dew	2006			Basketry
Roger Cain	2007			Masks
David Scott	2008			Languages
Bill Glass Jr.	2009			Sculpture
Wilma Mankiller	2010 (posthumously)	November 18, 1945	April 6, 2010	First woman Principal Chief of the Cherokee Nation
Ed Fields	2010			Language
Betty Christie Frogg	2010			Basketry
Edna Sue Thompson	2010			Language
Lisa Smith	2011			Turtle Shells
Bill Rabbit	2011	December 3, 1946	April 9, 2012	Artistry and preserving Cherokee culture
Durbin Feeling	2011	April 2, 1946	August 19, 2020	Advancing the Cherokee Language, Published first Cherokee-English dictionary
Victoria Vazquez	2012			Pottery
Cecil Dick	2012 (posthumously)	September 16,1915	April 25, 1992	Arts
Tonia Weavel	2012			Traditional clothing
Martha Berry	2013			Beading
Donald Vann	2013			Painting
Tommy Wildcat	2013			Blowgun and flute making
David Comingdeer	2014			Stickball sticks
Clesta Manley	2014	November 23, 1924		Painting
Eddie Morrison	2014			Sculpture
John Ross	2014			Language
Robert Lewis	2015			Storytelling
Dan Mink	2015			Graphic Design
Dennis Sixkiller	2015			Language
Richard Fields	2016			Bow making
Demos Glass	2016			Metalsmithing
Vyrl Keeter	2016	October 28, 1931		Flintknapping
Jesse Hummingbird	2017	February 12, 1952	June 17, 2021	Unique paintings and graphics
Mike Dart	2017	February 1, 1977		Contemporary Basketry
Troy Jackson	2018			Sculpture
Lisa Rutherford	2018			Pottery
Loretta Shade	2018			Language
Annie Wildcat	2018	1945	2018	Clay Beads
Candessa Tehee	2019			Weaving
Choogie Kingfisher	2019			Storyteller
Lula Elk	2019	March 22, 1961	November 18, 2024	Shell Shaker
David Crawler	2020			Language
Crosslin Smith	2020	November 27, 1929	February 24, 2024	Language
Traci Rabbit	2020			Painter
Dorothy Sullivan	2020	January 8, 1939	February 13, 2026	Painter
Danny McCarter	2021			Blowguns
Cathy Abercrombie	2021			Weaving
Harry Oosahwee	2021			Artist and Stonecarver
Barbara Adair	2022			Basketry
Weynema Smith	2022			Cherokee language preservation
Lena Stick	2022			Basketry
Diana Smith Cox	2023			Turtle shell shackles
Steven Daugherty	2023			Traditional weapons
Louisa Soap	2024			Basketry
Darrell Littledeer	2024			Traditional clothing
Roy Boney Jr.	2024			Painting
Ronald Mitchell	2025			Painting
Mary Aitson	2025	November 11, 1931	September 19, 2025	Basketry
