= Candessa Tehee =

American artist, professor and politician

Cherokee Nation Tribal Councilor for the 2nd district
- Incumbent
- Assumed office August 14, 2021
- Preceded by: Joe Byrd

Personal details
- Citizenship: American; Cherokee Nation
- Awards: Cherokee National Treasure

Candessa Tehee is a Cherokee Nation artist, professor, and politician who has served on the Cherokee Nation tribal council since 2021. She was named a Cherokee National Treasure in 2019.

== Family and education ==
Candessa Tehee is from Tahlequah, Oklahoma. Her grandfather was Cherokee National Treasure Roger McLemore and her grandmother was Elizabeth Pumpkin McLemore. Tehee speaks Cherokee and is "full blood" Cherokee. (Note: "Full blood" refers to blood quantum tracked by the United States federal government.) She earned her bachelor's and master's degrees from the University of Oklahoma, before earning her doctorate in linguistic anthropology from the same university.

== Career ==
In December 2013, she was appointed as the executive director of the Cherokee Heritage Center and she was the first woman, "full blood," and Cherokee language speaker to hold that position. Prior to her appointment she had worked for the Cherokee Nation for five years. She resigned in August 2016 to accept a position as an assistant professor of American Indian studies at Northeastern State University. While at NSU, she served as the coordinator for the Cherokee language and Cherokee cultural studies programs. In December 2016, she worked with Southeastern Indian Artist Association to raise funds for the Standing Rock Indian Reservation during the Dakota Access Pipeline protests. She was named a Cherokee National Treasure in 2019.

== Cherokee Nation tribal council ==
Tehee ran to succeed Joe Byrd in 2021 when he was term-limited from his Cherokee Nation tribal council seat for the 2nd district in a seven candidate race against Vicki Creel, Dusty Fore, Jami Murphy, Bobby Slover, Tonya Teaney and Claude Stover. After the June primary, she advanced to a runoff with Bobby Slover which she won by seven votes. After the election Slover was retroactively struck from the ballot for violating Cherokee Nation election laws. She was sworn into office on August 14, 2021. In May 2022, Tehee criticized fellow tribal councillor Wes Nofire's statements made during his 2022 congressional campaign that were critical of McGirt v. Oklahoma as "clearly treasonous, clearly traitorous" to the interests of the Cherokee Nation. She later voted in favor of a tribal council resolution opposing his appointment as Oklahoma's Native American Affairs Liaison in September 2023.

== See also ==
- List of Native American politicians
- Native American women in politics
