= Greg Jackson (MMA trainer) =

American martial arts trainer (born 1974)

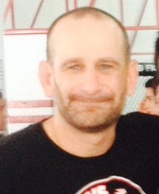
- Jackson in 2010
- Born: Gregory Jackson; June 16, 1974 (age 52); Washington D.C., U.S.

Other information
- Occupation: Trainer at Jackson Wink MMA Academy
- Spouse: Michele Iemolo (now known as Michele Jackson)
- Children: 2
- Notable school: Rio Grande High School
- Website: jacksonwink.com

Gregory Jackson (born June 16, 1974) is an American mixed martial arts (MMA) trainer who co-owns Jackson Wink MMA Academy in Albuquerque, New Mexico, widely considered one of the top MMA training centers in the world. Jackson has trained many successful fighters, including former UFC Heavyweight and Light Heavyweight Champion Jon Jones, former UFC Welterweight and Middleweight Champion Georges St-Pierre, former UFC Women's Bantamweight Champion Holly Holm, former Light Heavyweight Champion Rashad Evans, and a roster of other UFC contenders and World Extreme Cagefighting champions.

== History ==
Greg Jackson was born in Washington D.C. to Kris and Jim Jackson, who were Quakers originally from the Midwest. He and his family moved to Albuquerque, New Mexico, when he was three years old. He came from a family of wrestlers—his father, brother, and uncle were all champions in the sport—and grew up in a rough neighborhood. For his protection, he began learning judo through books and learning some boxing and kickboxing to complement his wrestling. He was suspended from school on more than one occasion for instigating fights.

In 1992, after graduating from Rio Grande High School, Jackson founded his own martial art, Gaidojutsu, which combines rudimentary techniques from boxing, kickboxing, and wrestling with basic judo locks. His school officially transitioned into an MMA academy in 2000. In 2007, Jackson partnered with striking coach Mike Winkeljohn, a seminal moment in the academy's development; since then, the gym has been known as Jackson Wink MMA Academy (JW MMA Academy), reflecting their partnership.

== Awards ==
Greg Jackson and his gym have won five World MMA Awards altogether. He won the Coach of the Year award in 2009, 2010 and 2011. His old gym, Greg Jackson Fighting Systems won the Gym of the Year award in 2009. The contemporary Jackson-Wink MMA Academy won the same award in 2015. In 2008, he was named Sports Illustrated's Best Trainer and Rear Naked News's Trainer of the Year. Jackson was also named Instructor of the Year by Black Belt magazine in 2015.

Jackson is a member of the New Mexico Sports Hall of Fame.

== Filmography ==
In July 2012, Jackson was featured in the premiere episode of Sports Illustrated presented by Lexus in a segment titled War and Peace in Jackson's Gym, which aired on July 24, 2012, on NBC Sports Network. Later that year, he also appeared in the YouTube-based comedy series Enter The Dojo.

=== Reality television ===
On February 5, 2013, Jackson signed with Bellator to coach on the promotion's reality series titled Fight Master: Bellator MMA.
