= Ken Giles =

American baseball player (born 1990)

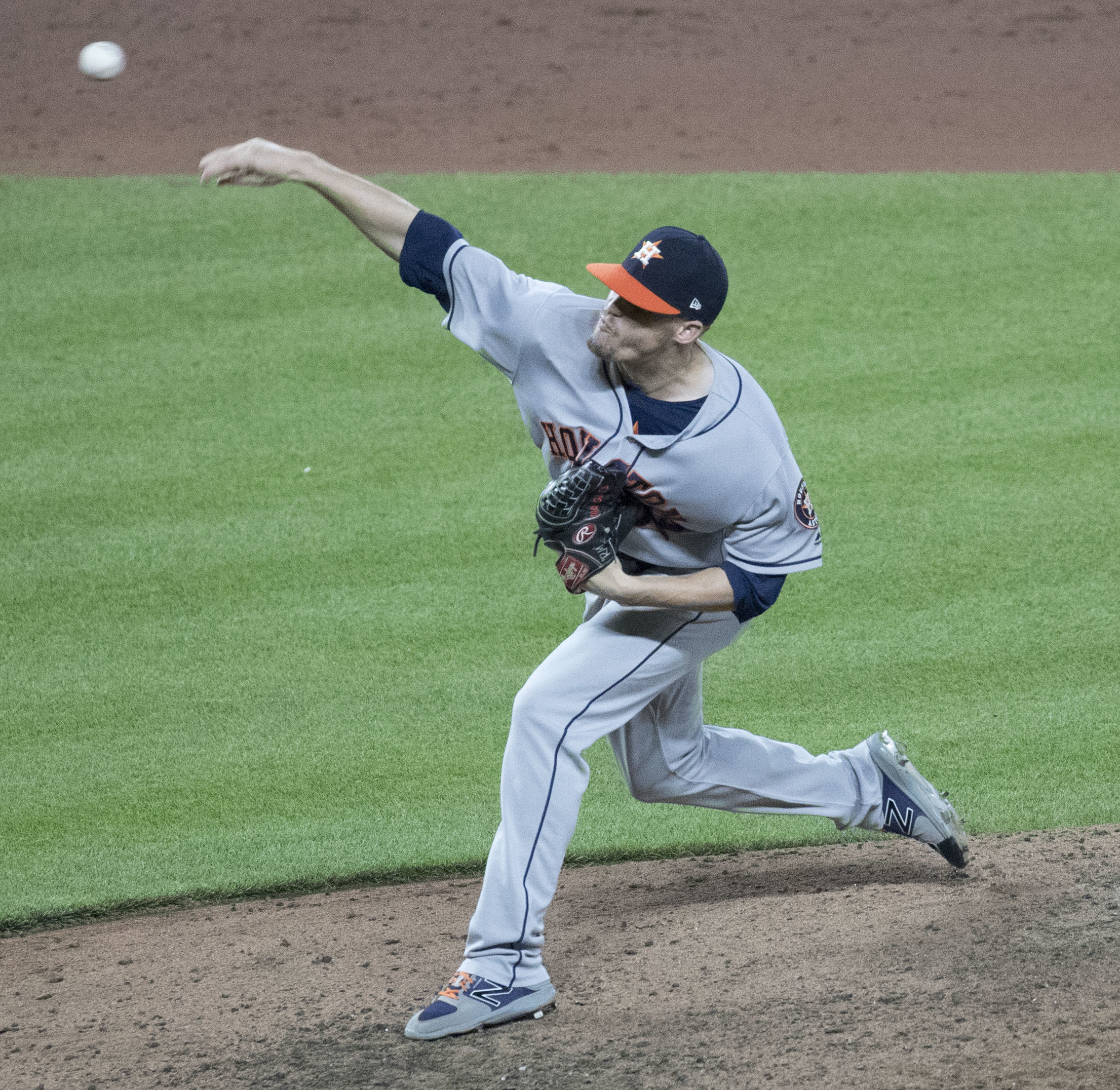
- Giles with the Houston Astros in 2017

Free agent
- Pitcher
- Born: September 20, 1990 (age 36); Albuquerque, New Mexico, U.S.
- Bats: Right Throws: Right

MLB debut
- June 12, 2014, for the Philadelphia Phillies

MLB statistics (through 2022 season)
- Win–loss record: 14–18
- Earned run average: 2.71
- Strikeouts: 484
- Saves: 115
- Stats at Baseball Reference

Teams
- Philadelphia Phillies (2014–2015); Houston Astros (2016–2018); Toronto Blue Jays (2018–2020); Seattle Mariners (2022)

Career highlights and awards
- World Series champion (2017); Pitched a combined no-hitter on September 1, 2014

Kenneth Robert Giles (born September 20, 1990) is an American professional baseball pitcher who is a free agent. He has previously played in Major League Baseball (MLB) for the Philadelphia Phillies, Houston Astros, Toronto Blue Jays, and Seattle Mariners.

Exposed to baseball at an early age, Giles played the game while attending Rio Grande High School in Albuquerque, New Mexico. Although he was drafted out of high school by the Florida Marlins, Giles instead enrolled at Yavapai College, where he played college baseball until the Phillies drafted him in the seventh round (241st overall) of the 2011 Major League Baseball draft.

Giles quickly progressed through the Phillies' Minor League Baseball (MiLB) system, overcoming two oblique injuries to participate in major league spring training before the 2014 season. Although he began that season in MiLB, Giles soon received a promotion to the major leagues, making his debut on June 12. One of the team's few bright spots that season, Giles finished fourth in National League Rookie of the Year voting.

Giles opened the 2015 season as the team's primary setup man, but when the Phillies traded their closer (Jonathan Papelbon), Giles assumed that role. Renowned for his fastball that can reach upwards of 100 miles per hour (160 km/h), Giles is a power pitcher who pairs his fastball with a slider to compile high strike-out rates.

== Early life ==
Giles was born on September 20, 1990, in Albuquerque, New Mexico. From an early age, he was exposed to baseball. His father, Glenn, who had never played baseball himself, apparently saw potential in Ken when he was in pre-school to be a baseball player, and encouraged him to pursue the sport at that young age. Giles attended Rio Grande High School in Albuquerque, New Mexico, where he played baseball, although he was mainly an outfielder, and used his arm strength to throw out runners rather than pitch. He also played football and basketball in college, but focused predominantly on baseball.

Giles was drafted by the Florida Marlins in the 44th round of the 2009 Major League Baseball draft, but did not sign and instead attended Yavapai College, which Giles praised as a great place to focus on baseball without having to go to a large university. At Yavapai, the alma mater of Curt Schilling, Giles began pitching regularly, and realized his talent on the mound. At Yavapai, he posted a 1.18 earned run average (ERA) with 67 strikeouts in 38 innings pitched (15.9 strikeouts per nine innings pitched (K/9)).

== Professional career ==
=== Philadelphia Phillies ===
==== Minor leagues ====
Giles was drafted by the Philadelphia Phillies in the seventh round, with the 241st overall selection, of the 2011 Major League Baseball draft, and he signed with the club despite initially committing to transfer to play college baseball for the University of Arizona. He made his professional debut with the Gulf Coast League Phillies that year, and made three appearances with the team, pitching to a 5.79 ERA, and averaging 5.8 walks per 9 innings.

Giles opened the 2012 season with the Low-A Lakewood BlueClaws, and after finding success there – he recorded five saves and a 3.61 ERA, working mostly as a reliever (although occasionally as a starter) – he earned a promotion to the High-A Clearwater Threshers, with whom he worked solely out of the bullpen, and posted a 3.07 ERA and .183 batting average against (BAA).

In 2013, he returned to Clearwater. During the season, he strained each oblique, limiting him to 24 appearances in which he was 2–2 with a 6.31 ERA, and perhaps hurting his control on the mound, as his walk rate ballooned to 6.7 every nine innings, in comparison to 5.5 the preceding year. After the season, he pitched in the Arizona Fall League, at which point MLBPipeline.com commentator Bernie Pleskoff said "his (Giles') command and control are a little behind his velocity", but that he was a "terrific, closer-type arm" who reminded him of Jonathan Papelbon, whom Giles was a candidate to – and ultimately did – replace as the Phillies' closer. Other scouts questioned his aptitude as a major league pitcher due to his "penchant for wildness." Aside from one outing in which he surrendered six runs without recording a single out, Giles' ERA in the Arizona Fall League was 0.00 (with that outing, it was 5.23), as he gave up eight walks in 10 1/3 innings. He finished the season facing an uncertain developmental future, as his velocity was universally acknowledged, but his durability and control universally questioned.

As observers expected, Giles began the 2014 season with the Reading Phillies after spending some time with the major league club during spring training. Through his first seven appearances, he allowed only two hits, and routinely reached over 100 miles per hour (160 km/h) with his fastball. His primary focus was developing a secondary pitch, namely a slider, and working on locating his fastball within the strike zone. With the worst bullpen in the major leagues, the Phillies faced mounting pressure to accelerate Giles' ascent through the minor leagues, but both manager Ryne Sandberg and general manager Rubén Amaro, Jr. preached patience, asserting that he needed more time to develop. On May 9, Giles was promoted to the Triple-A Lehigh Valley IronPigs to further hone his skills, and receive the chance to face better hitters, closer to what he would eventually face in the major leagues. In 11 appearances at Triple-A, he posted a 2.63 ERA, but struck out just nine in comparison to eight walks issued. In regards to striking out fewer batters, Giles said, "They (Triple-A hitters) were more experienced, but I wasn't trying to do too much. I wasn't trying to strike everyone out kind of thing. I just tried to make good pitches and get outs. Get out of innings as quick as possible. The less pitches I had, the better."

==== Major leagues ====
On June 7, 2014, Giles was promoted to the major leagues after the Phillies placed Mike Adams on the disabled list (DL). Four days after the promotion, he made his major league debut in a game against the San Diego Padres, and relinquished a home run to his first batter, but then worked through the inning to preserve a lead for the Phillies, who won the game. His first winning decision came on August 10 against the New York Mets. On September 1, Giles was part of a combined no-hitter against the Atlanta Braves; Cole Hamels, Giles, Jake Diekman, and Papelbon did not allow a hit in the game's nine innings. Later that month, Giles picked up his first save as a major league pitcher in a game against the Oakland Athletics on September 20. Giles ranked among the best relievers in the major leagues in many key statistical categories relating to strikeouts, ERA, and walks plus hits per innings pitched (WHIP). He also represented a bright spot for the Phillies – and a point of pride for the fan base – during a rebuilding phase for the team. Adam Dembowitz of Crashburn Alley, an ESPN affiliated blog, wrote, "He's pretty awesome. He's cheap and young and he's a Phillie. Ken Giles is one of the reasons we should all feel good about this offseason and the current rebuilding period." Giles finished fourth in the National League Rookie of the Year voting. He finished the season with a 3–1 record, a 1.18 ERA, and one save in 44 games.

Coming off a "meteoric rise through the Phillies' organization last season en route to becoming one of the top young relievers in baseball", Giles opened the 2015 Philadelphia Phillies season firmly implanted as the team's setup man, with his goal of being the team's closer something he did not take for granted, noting he had to "earn that position." Early in the season, he was not as dominant as he had been during his rookie season, but still was among the best relievers in the major leagues. Scouts observed that Giles had an inclination to use his slider more often to compensate for command of his fastball that needed improvement. When the Phillies traded Jonathan Papelbon to the Washington Nationals on July 28, Giles became the team's regular closer; in his first outing as such, he recorded a save against the Toronto Blue Jays.

=== Houston Astros ===
On December 12, 2015, the Phillies traded Giles and Jonathan Arauz to the Houston Astros in exchange for Mark Appel, Vince Velasquez, Brett Oberholtzer, Tom Eshelman, and Harold Arauz.

In 2016, Giles made 69 appearances with a 2–5 record, a 4.11 ERA, and 15 saves.

In 2017, he made 63 appearances with a 1–3 record, a 2.30 ERA, and 34 saves. The Astros finished the year 101–61, and eventually won the 2017 World Series for their first championship. However, Giles was ineffective in the postseason; by the end of the World Series, the Astros had stopped using him.

On February 2, 2018, Giles won his arbitration case versus the Astros, for a $4.6 million salary. The Astros had proposed $4.2 million. Giles struggled throughout the beginning of the 2018 season, allowing 17 earned runs on 36 hits in 30 2/3 innings for a 4.99 ERA. The Astros demoted him to the Fresno Grizzlies of the Triple-A Pacific Coast League on July 11, where in 5.1 innings he gave up 9 hits and had an 8.44 ERA.

=== Toronto Blue Jays ===
On July 30, 2018, the Astros traded Giles, Héctor Pérez, and David Paulino to the Toronto Blue Jays for Roberto Osuna. Giles appeared in 21 games for the Blue Jays in 2018, pitching to a 4.12 ERA with 14 saves and 22 strikeouts over 19 2/3 innings.

Giles successfully converted 34 consecutive save opportunities in a streak that began on September 12, 2017, when he was still a member of the Astros, and ended on April 11, 2019, in a game against the Boston Red Sox. On May 10, Giles earned his 100th career save when he closed out a 4–3 win against the Chicago White Sox. Giles entered the All-Star break with a 1.45 ERA, 13 saves, and 53 strikeouts over 31 innings. His ERA was the seventh best among qualified relievers prior to the break, and his 1.50 fielding independent pitching (FIP) was the best among qualified American League relievers, and the second best among all qualified major league relievers. On July 20, Giles set a Blue Jays franchise record by recording his 26th consecutive relief appearance with at least one strikeout. Giles finished the 2019 season with a 1.87 ERA and 83 strikeouts in 53 innings.

With the 2020 Toronto Blue Jays, Giles appeared in four games, with 9.82 ERA and four hits, four walks, and six strikeouts in 3 2/3 innings pitched. On September 30, 2020, Giles underwent Tommy John surgery.

=== Seattle Mariners ===
On February 19, 2021, Giles signed with the Seattle Mariners on a two-year, $7M major league contract. On March 31, Giles was placed on the 60-day injured list. He missed the entire year while recovering from Tommy John.

On May 8, 2022, Giles was placed on the 60-day injured list with a right middle finger sprain. Giles was activated from the injured list on June 20. He made five scoreless appearances for Seattle, recording six strikeouts over 4 1/3 innings pitched. Giles was designated for assignment by the Mariners on August 12. On August 14, he elected free agency.

=== San Francisco Giants ===
On August 22, 2022, Giles signed a minor league deal with the San Francisco Giants. After one start with the rookie-level Arizona Complex League Giants, Giles made three appearances for the Triple-A Sacramento River Cats, logging a 3.38 ERA with two strikeouts in 2 2/3 innings of work. He was released by the Giants organization on August 30.

=== Los Angeles Dodgers ===
On May 20, 2023, Giles signed a minor league deal with the Los Angeles Dodgers. He pitched in 19 games for the Triple-A Oklahoma City Dodgers, allowing 19 earned runs in 18 innings for a 9.50 ERA. Giles elected free agency following the season on November 6.

=== Atlanta Braves ===
On February 2, 2024, Giles signed a minor league contract with the Atlanta Braves that included an invitation to spring training. He made 42 appearances out of the bullpen for the Triple-A Gwinnett Stripers, logging a 4-2 record and 6.28 ERA with 58 strikeouts and four saves across 38 2/3 innings pitched. Giles elected free agency following the season on November 4.

=== Leones de Yucatán ===
On June 17, 2025, Giles signed with the Leones de Yucatán of the Mexican League. In 16 appearances for Yucatán, he struggled to an 0-3 record and 7.71 ERA with 15 strikeouts over 14 innings of work. Giles was released by the Leones on July 22.

=== Piratas de Campeche ===
On July 28, 2025, Giles signed with the Piratas de Campeche of the Mexican League. He made four appearances for Campeche, recording 4 1/3 scoreless innings of relief with one victory and eight strikeouts. Giles was released by the Piratas on April 14, 2026.

== Pitching style ==
A power pitcher, Giles' fastball has hit as high as 103 miles per hour (166 km/h), and he relies on it in tandem with a slider in which he spent much of his developmental phase building confidence. His fastball typically registers around 97 miles per hour (156 km/h), in contrast to a slider that registers around 87 mph (140 km/h). Very occasionally, he mixes in a change up and sinker. He has always had an aptitude for striking out hitters, which potentially obviated the need for him to record as many groundouts as other pitchers needed to be successful. A slight decline in fastball velocity, at the beginning of the 2015 season, helped him develop more command, something he called a "blessing in disguise."

== Personal life ==
Giles married Estela Piñon, a former softball pitcher at the University of Arizona, in 2015. They have two sons and reside in Peoria, Arizona.

Preceded by Tim Lincecum	No-hit game September 1, 2014 (with Hamels, Diekman & Papelbon)	Succeeded by Jordan Zimmermann
