= Billy Walkabout =

United States Army soldier (1949–2007)

- Born: March 31, 1949; Cherokee County, Oklahoma, United States
- Died: March 7, 2007 (aged 57); Montville, Connecticut, United States
- Burial place: Arlington National Cemetery
- Military career
- Allegiance: United States
- Branch: United States Army
- Rank: Second Lieutenant
- Units: 58th Infantry; 101st Airborne Division
- Conflicts: Vietnam War
- Awards: Distinguished Service Cross; Bronze Star; Purple Heart; Army Commendation Medal; Ranger Tab.

Billy Walkabout (March 31, 1949 – March 7, 2007) is thought to be the most decorated Native American soldier of the Vietnam War. He received one Distinguished Service Cross (upgraded from Silver Star), one Bronze Star Medal, one Army Commendation Medal, and one Purple Heart.

== Background and family ==
Walkabout was born on March 31, 1949, in Cherokee County, Oklahoma. He was a citizen of the Cherokee Nation, belonging to the Blue Holly Clan, Anisahoni, and was the son of Warren Walkabout and Bobby Jean Chaudoin Walkabout.

== Military service ==
Walkabout served as a combat infantryman in Vietnam, serving in Company F (LRP) ( 1 Feb 1969 became L co 75th Inf RGR ) 58th Infantry, which was attached to the 101st Airborne Division. Walkabout distinguished himself by exceptionally valorous actions on 20 November 1968 during a long range reconnaissance patrol southwest of Hue.

After successfully ambushing an enemy squad on a jungle trail, the friendly patrol radioed for immediate helicopter extraction. When the extraction helicopters arrived and the lead man began moving toward the pick-up zone, he was seriously wounded by hostile automatic weapons fire. PFC Walkabout quickly rose to his feet and delivered steady suppressive fire on the attackers while other team members pulled the wounded man back to their ranks. Sergeant Walkabout then administered first aid to the soldier in preparation for medical evacuation. As the man was being loaded onto the evacuation helicopter, enemy elements again attacked the team.

Maneuvering under heavy fire, PFC Walkabout positioned himself where the enemy were concentrating their assault and placed continuous rifle fire on the adversary. A command-detonated mine ripped through the friendly team, instantly killing three men and wounding all the others. Although stunned and wounded by the blast, PFC Walkabout rushed from man to man administering first aid, bandaging one soldier's severe chest wound and reviving another soldier by heart massage. He then coordinated gunship and tactical air strikes on the enemy's positions. When evacuation helicopters arrived again, he worked single-handedly under fire to board his disabled comrades. Only when the casualties had been evacuated and friendly reinforcements had arrived, did he allow himself to be extracted.

== Death ==
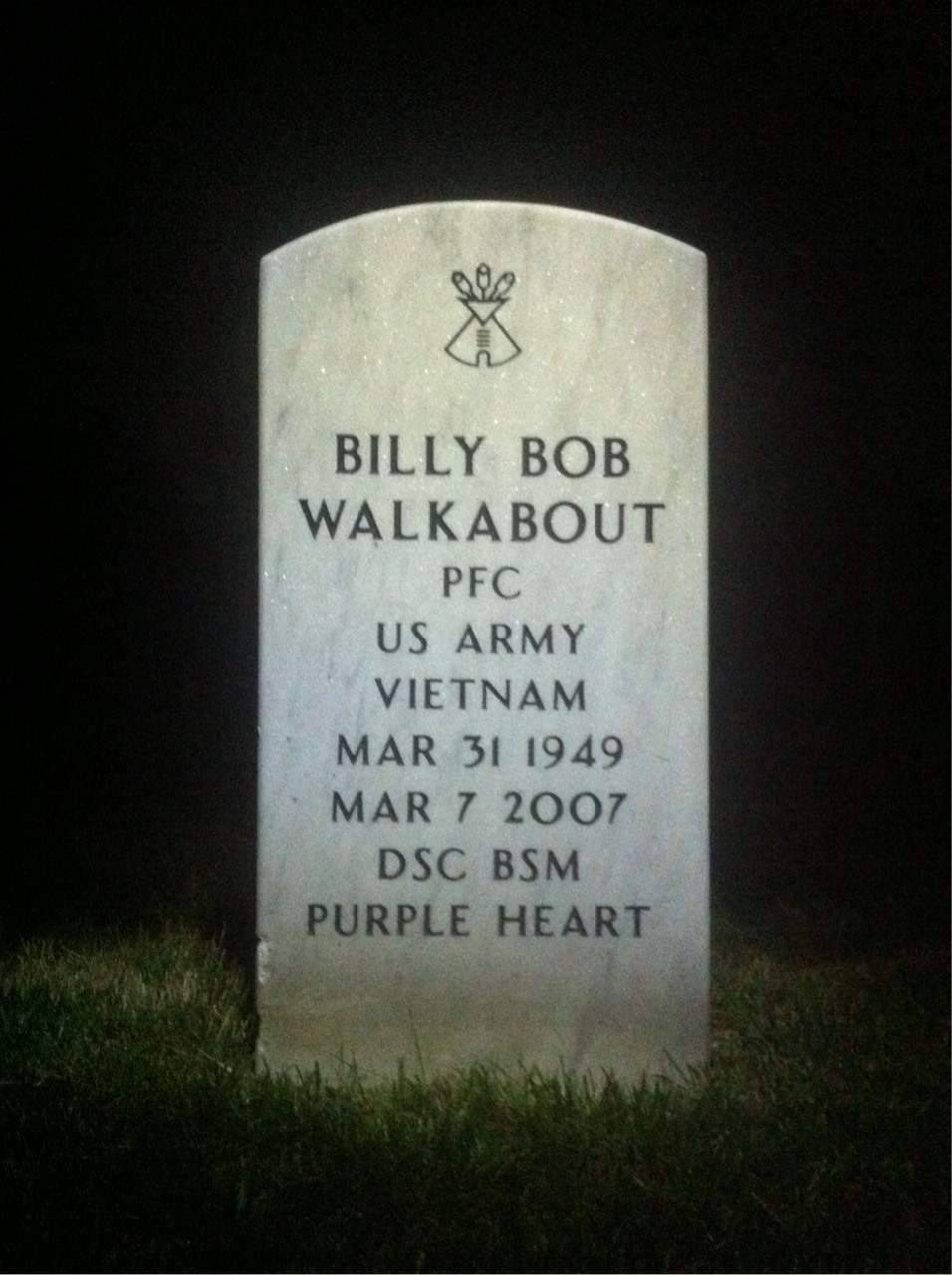
Grave at Arlington National Cemetery

He suffered from complications arising from exposure to the Agent Orange defoliant used in Vietnam. He was waiting for a kidney transplant and took dialysis three times a week. He died of pneumonia and renal failure in a hospital in Norwich, Connecticut, survived by his wife and several children from earlier marriages.

Walkabout was buried at Arlington National Cemetery, in Arlington, Virginia.

He was honored in a portrait, Walkabout: A Warrior's Spirit, by Cherokee artist Talmadge Davis.
