= Fernando Padilla Jr. =

American painter

- Born: July 29, 1958; Huntington Park, CA
- Website: http://www.padillaofsanfelipe.com

Fernando Padilla Jr. (born July 29, 1958) is a Native American artist. His father was full blood San Felipe Pueblo and his mother is Navajo and Apache. Padilla is enrolled with the San Felipe Pueblo and is listed as half San Felipe Pueblo and half Navajo. Padilla was born in Huntington Park, California. He grew up in various places in New Mexico and Arizona due to his father's job with the U.S. Forestry Service. He moved to Oklahoma in 1978 and still lives there to date. Best known for his painting of the Southwestern landscape and Pueblo life, Padilla also creates multi-dimensional artwork, sculpture and jewelry.

== Education ==
Padilla graduated from Rio Grande High School in Albuquerque, NM in 1976. He attended college in Albuquerque, NM and later transferred to Bethany Nazarene College in Bethany, Oklahoma in 1978.

== Public collections ==
“Spirit of the People" – Denver International Airport (Permanent Exhibit) Selected as one of ten artists by Western American Indian Chamber to create site-specific work for the Denver International Airport. Chosen to illustrate Native American life during the Anasazi Period, Padilla's mural shows a panoramic view of a cliff dwelling community (1992).

== Museums and exhibitions ==
- Red Earth Master's Show, Oklahoma City, OK
- Dallas Museum of Art, Dallas, TX
- Story of the Sacred Hoop Exhibit, Stuttgart, Germany
- Millicent Rogers Museum, Taos, NM
- Institute of the Franco American Exhibit, Renes, France
- Red Earth Museum, Oklahoma City, OK
- Natural History Museum of Los Angeles County, CA
- Denver Art Museum, Denver, CO
- Museum of the Great Plains, Woodward, OK
- Denver International Airport, Denver, CO
- Indian Pueblo Cultural Center, Albuquerque, NM
- Fred Jones Jr. Museum of Art, Norman, OK
- Cherokee National Museum, Tahlequah, OK

== Publications ==
Besides being listed in "The Biographical Directory of Native American Painters", Padilla and his artwork also appear in Turner Publishing's "The Native Americans" and "Artistic Tastes – Favorite Recipes of Native American Artists" by Barbara Harjo and Julie Pearson Little Thunder.

== Personal life ==
Fernando Padilla Jr. lives in Ada, Oklahoma
