= Talmadge Davis =

American painter

Talmadge Lee Davis
- Born: May 30, 1962; McAlester, Oklahoma
- Died: November 3, 2005 (aged 43); Broken Arrow, Oklahoma
- Known for: Painting (naturalism, portraiture)
- Awards: Five Civilized Tribes Museum Master Artist, Cherokee Medal of Honor

Talmadge Davis (1962–2005) was a Cherokee artist, who explored historical and military themes in his highly naturalistic paintings.

== Personal ==
Talmadge Davis was born May 30, 1962. His parents were Robert Lee Davis and Patricia (Horton) Davis, of Porum, Oklahoma. Talmadge had 2 younger brothers, James W. Davis and Bobby R. Davis Sr. His paternal grandmother was full-blood Cherokee traditionalist and midwife, Sallie Toney Davis (1895–1988), the great-great-granddaughter of Sequoyah. Later in life, Talmadge painted a portrait of his grandmother, Sallie Toney Davis, Quiet Dignity: My Grandma.

He served in the US Army from 1983 to 1987 in Germany.

He died on November 3, 2005, of a heart attack and was buried at Fort Gibson Oklahoma National Cemetery.

== Art work and honors ==
Talmadge was given the title of Master Artist by the Five Civilized Tribes Museum in Muskogee, Oklahoma and was also awarded the Cherokee Medal of Honor for helping bring Cherokee culture to the public.

Many of his works of art depicted scenes of military themes, inspired by his own experiences in the army. The United States Military Academy at West Point commissioned a painting from him for the two hundredth anniversary of their founding. His painting, Walkabout-A Warrior's Spirit portrays a historical person, Billy Walkabout, a Cherokee full-blood who was the most highly decorated Indian veteran of the Vietnam War. One of his most famous paintings is Brothers Gone but Not Forgotten, an acrylic painting from 2000, which portrayed a grieving man in a wheelchair touching the Vietnam War Memorial and faint images of fallen comrades can be seen in man's reflection. In this painting, Talmadge painted the names of each of the 238 Native Americans who died in the Vietnam War.

Davis' work was part of a traveling exhibit that was featured at the National Museum of the American Indian in Washington DC. He exhibited and regularly won awards at the Cherokee Heritage Center, Tulsa Indian Festival, Wichita Indian Market, and the Southwest Classic Art Show.
