= Sharon Irla =

Cherokee artist

Sharon Irla (born 1957) is a Cherokee artist, enrolled in the Cherokee Nation. A self-taught artist, Irla began entering competitive art shows in 2003. Her collective body of works span the fields of painting, murals, graphics, photography, and custom picture frames with Southeastern Woodlands / Mississippian motifs. The majority of her awarded works are oil-on-canvas portraits of Cherokee women in both contemporary and historical settings.

== Themes ==
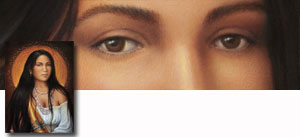
Detail of Beloved Woman of the Cherokee with thumbnail inset of full portrait by Sharon Irla

Irla's most prevalent body of works are oil portraits of Native American women in both contemporary and historical settings. Her stated mission is to emphasize the complexity and importance of Native American women, thereby filing a perceived void in the artistic record.

"Throughout history," Irla notes, "Native American women have been depicted in art far less often than Native American men, yet women played at least as important a role. For instance, the Cherokee used to have a Council of Women, and some Cherokee women, like Nanyehi (Nancy Ward), rose to the honored status of "Beloved Woman", or "War Woman". These women rendered considerably weighty tribal decisions, but we don't find paintings of any of them."

== Technique ==
As a self-taught artist, Irla cites Caravaggio as being most influential toward the development of her own method, which she describes as "a combining of dramatic illumination and Old Masters technique."

== Community action and collaborations ==
Irla is a founding member of the Southeastern Indian Artists Association, formerly known as the Cherokee Artists Association which strives to promote Southeastern Woodlands art and protect the interests of Native American artists.

She assisted GaDuGi artists (Bill Glass, Gary Allen, Demos Glass, Robby McMurtry, and Ken Foster) with "The Passage," an outdoor art installment at Ross Landing in Chattanooga, Tennessee. It was through Ross Landing that many Cherokee made passage to Indian Territory (Oklahoma) during the Trail of Tears.

== Awards ==
Sharon Irla's first competitive art show entry was in 2003 with the oil-on-canvas portrait titled "She Was a Warrior" which received an Honorable Mention at the Cherokee Homecoming Art Show in Park Hill, Oklahoma. Irla has since won awards in multiple Native American, competitive art shows.

- Honorable Mention - 2003 Home Coming Art show, Cherokee Heritage Center, Park Hill, OK - She Was A Warrior
- Honorable Mention - 2005 Home Coming Art show, Cherokee Heritage Center, Park Hill, OK - Serpentine Birds
- Best Of Show - 2007 Cherokee Art Market, Catoosa, OK - Cherokee Beauty
- Best of Category (paintings) - 2007 Cherokee Art Market, Catoosa, OK - Cherokee Beauty
- Best Of Category (paintings) - 2007 Trail Of Tears Art Show, Park Hill, OK - Cherokee Beauty
- Chief's Choice - 2007 Cherokee Nation Holiday Art Show, Park Hill, OK - Cherokee Beauty
- 1st Place - 2007 Cherokee National Holiday Art Show, Park Hill, OK - Tellico Mysteries
- Honorable Mention - 2007 Trail of Tears Art Show, Park Hill, OK - Tellico Mysteries
- Best Of Category (paintings) - 2008 Trail Of Tears Art Show, Park Hill, OK - Crows Stirring The Magic
- First Place - 2008 Cherokee National Holiday Art Show, Park Hill, OK - Crows Stirring The Magic
- Speaker Of The Council Award - 2008 Cherokee National Holiday Art Show, Park Hill, OK - Crows Stirring The Magic
- Chief's Choice Award - 2008 Cherokee National Holiday Art Show, Park Hill, OK - Warrior's Call
- Best Of Show - 2008 Five Civilized Tribes Museum, Muskogee, OK - Mother's Prayer
- Peoples' Choice - 2008 Five Civilized Tribes Museum, Muskogee, OK - Mother's Prayer
- Honorable Mention - 2008 Trail of Tears Art Show, Park Hill, OK - Mother's Prayer
- Best of Show - 2009 Southeastern Art Show (Chickasaw Nation), Ada, OK - Beloved Woman of The Cherokee
- 1st Place - 2009 Trail of Tears Art Show, Park Hill, OK - Mississippian Ink
- Best of Show - 2009 Cherokee Holiday Art Show, Park Hill, OK - Beloved Woman of the Cherokee
- 1st Place - 2009 Southeastern Art Show (Chickasaw Nation), Ada, OK - Crows Stirring The Magic
