= Les Berryhill =

Native American artist

Les BerryHill (Lester Roy Berryhill)
- Born: Lester Roy Berryhill; 1944; Talihina, Oklahoma, United States
- Citizenship: Muscogee (Creek) Nation
- Education: Atoka High School; Oklahoma State University; University of Central Oklahoma
- Known for: Beadwork
- Website: lesterberryhill.com

Les Berryhill (Lester Roy Berryhill) is a Native American artist focusing on beadwork. He lives in Edmond, Oklahoma and is a member of the Yuchi and Muscogee tribes.

== Early life ==
Les Berryhill was born in Talihina, Oklahoma, and grew up in Coalgate, Oklahoma. Berryhill moved to Atoka, Oklahoma in his junior year of high school. He graduated from Atoka High School in 1962. His mother was a dietitian at the Atoka hospital and his father was a city employee in Coalgate. He began playing sports in junior high and high school focusing on track, baseball, football and basketball. Bud Wilkinson, the University of Oklahoma coach, offered him a football scholarship, instead, Berryhill accepted a basketball scholarship from Oklahoma State University, playing for legendary coach, Henry Iba. Berryhill was a member of the basketball team that won the Big Eight championship in 1965. He graduated with a bachelor's degree in social studies. Berryhill received his master's from the University of Central Oklahoma. He served in the military and was stationed at Fort Polk, Louisiana. Berryhill had little interest in art growing up, but enjoyed collecting antique knives, which would lead to his bead art.

== Career ==
Berryhill taught history and geography at Star Spencer High School in Oklahoma City, Oklahoma and served as a coach. Later, he coached at Putnam City High School and Duncan and Lawton Eisenhower. In 1970, Berryhill returned to Oklahoma State University as an assistant basketball coach for three years. He became the men's basketball coach at Rose State College in 1979 and served also as counselor and instructor. Berryhill became the athletic director while at Rose State College, retiring in 2010.

== Art Work ==
Berryhill is a self-taught artist specializing in beadwork of cultural artifacts. His only art class was in pencil drawing while he attended Oklahoma State University. He was inspired to start beadwork after seeing a selection of beaded knife cases in a Santa Fe gallery in the mid-1980s. Berryhill began beading knife sheaths to showcase his collection of old knives. Later, he started beading medicine bags, small coin purses, and embellishing antique kitchen utensils as well as Navajo chief's blankets. His work conveys the favor of reds, blues, turquoises, oranges and greens, mimicking the Plain's style and colors. He researches his designs during museum trips as well as in books. Berryhill has exhibited his work at the prestigious Santa Fe Indian Market, Red Earth Native American Cultural Festival, Cherokee Art Market, Jackson Hole Art Show, and the Heard Museum's Indian Fair. He is represented by the Shiprock gallery in Santa Fe, New Mexico.

== Awards ==
- Spirit of the Elk received the "Honored One," at the 28th Red Earth Native American Cultural Festival, 2014
- Beaded First-The One That Got Away, received 2nd Place in Beadwork for the Art Competition at the Annual Red Earth Native American Cultural Festival, 2014.
- Third Place Ribbon in the Diverse Art Forms category at the 82nd Annual Santa Fe Indian Market, 2003.
