= First American Art Magazine =

Native American art magazine

- First American Art Magazine, N° 1, Fall 2013 cover, artwork by Nanibah Chacon
- Publishing editor: America Meredith
- Categories: Art magazine
- Frequency: Quarterly
- Format: Print and digital
- Founded: 2013
- First issue: April 15, 2013
- Company: First American Art Magazine, LLC
- Country: United States
- Based in: Norman, Oklahoma
- Language: English, primarily
- Website: firstamerican.art
- ISSN: 2333-5548
- OCLC: 840802595

The First American Art Magazine is a quarterly art magazine covering living, historical, and ancestral art of Indigenous peoples of the Americas.

== Background ==
First American Art Magazine was established in 2013 "to provide a common platform for Native and non-Native academics, art professionals, artists, collectors, and other interested readers to seriously investigate and celebrate Indigenous American art—from ancestral to 21st century artwork." The publishing editor is America Meredith (Cherokee Nation); literary editor is Matthew Ryan Smith, PhD; publicity director is Barbara Harjo; and circulation manager is Melissa Dominguez.

== Content ==
The magazine includes profiles of living Native artists, features articles, and several departments: Recent Developments (news); an "Exploring Native Graphic Design" column; Seven Directions (a top seven list); "Spotlight" (focusing on an individual artwork); Advice; Art + Literature; memorials; classified advertising; and reviews of art exhibitions, art books, and video/films.

== Distribution ==
FAAM is distributed in Canada, the United States, and internationally by Disticor Magazine Distribution Services, as well as directly by the publisher and at Native American art fairs and conferences.

== Honors ==
Library Journal selected First American Art Magazine as one of its Best Magazines launched in 2013, and wrote that, "A notable strength of the publication is its emphasis on the work of contemporary artists."

== See also ==
- American Indian studies
- Roy Boney Jr. (Cherokee Nation)
- Kelly Church (Odawa/Ojibwe/Potawatomi)
- Teri Greeves (Kiowa)
- Suzan Shown Harjo, Hon.DFA (Cheyenne/Muscogee)
- Thollem McDonas
- Mary Jo Watson, PhD (Seminole)
