= Tommy Wildcat =

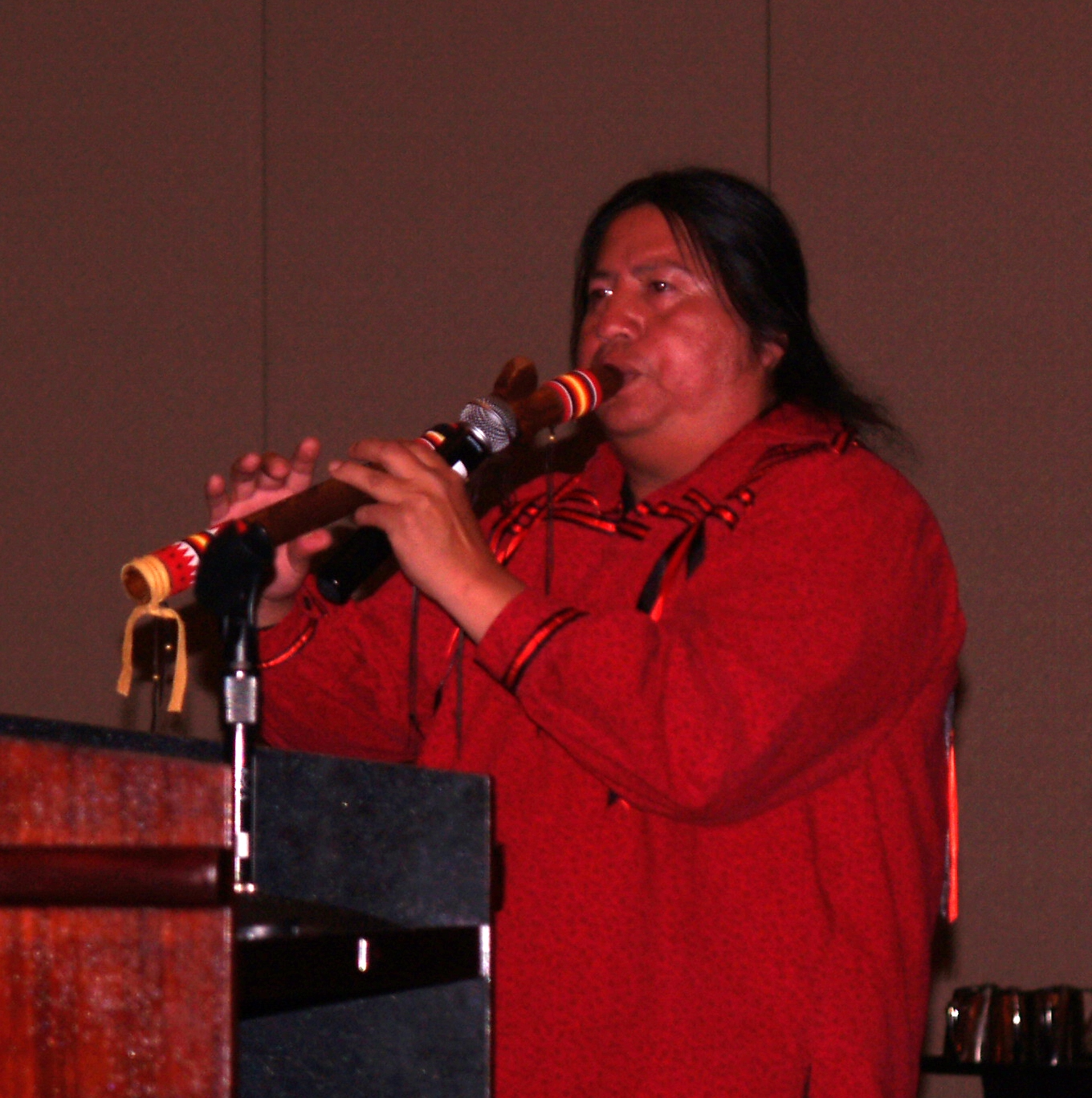
Cherokee Nation "National Treasure" Tommy Wildcat, playing the flute at the Cherokee Nation Hard rock Casino CCO - Community Cultural Outreach Cherokee Leaders Conference in Catoosa/Tulsa, Oklahoma, 2013

Tommy Wildcat (born May 3, 1967) is a Native American musician and academic.

== Background ==
Cherokee Nation National Treasure Tommy Wildcat is an enrolled citizen of the Cherokee Nation, Tulsa Indian Alliance Lifetime Cultural Achievement Award Recipient, NAMA - Native American Music Award Flutist of the Year 2002. His parents are Annie and the late Tom Webber Wildcat. Both are Cherokee National Treasures. He also has a twin sister named Tammy. Tommy graduated from Sequoyah High School 1985, and he is a 2014 graduate of Northeastern State University in Tahlequah, Oklahoma. His Bachelor's Degree included a Major in Cherokee Cultural Studies and a Minor in American Indian Studies. His family appeared in National Geographic magazine's September 2005 issue, where one photo showed Tommy holding his young nephew, Skylar Wildcat. His father Tom Wildcat was designated a Cherokee National Treasure in 1995 for his skill in making turtle shell shakers. Mother Annie Wildcat was Bestowed a Cherokee National Treasure in 2018 for Clay Bead Necklaces. Tommy was featured in the American Express commercial Charge Against Hunger 1995, which aired during the Beatles Anthology.

== Music ==
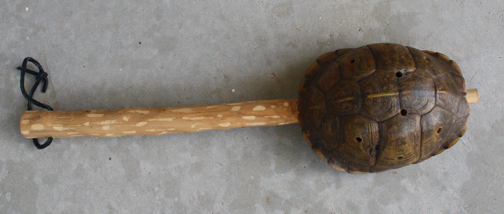
Turtleshell rattle made by Tommy Wildcat

A self-taught composer of flute songs, Tommy has learned traditional vocal songs of his tribe from his father, Tom W. Wildcat.

Tommy Wildcat's company, A Warrior's Production, has produced four full-length albums. His first was released in 1995, including Tom Richard's The Real Outdoors on the Nashville Network.
