= Rio Grande High School =

High School in Albuquerque, New Mexico

Location
- 2300 Arenal Rd SW; South Valley (Albuquerque postal address), New Mexico 87105; United States; 35°03′00″N 106°41′40″W

Information
- Type: Public high school
- Established: 1959
- Principal: Antoinette Valenzuela
- Teaching staff: 102.85 (FTE)
- Enrollment: 1,500 (2023-2024)
- Student to teacher ratio: 14.58
- Colors: Red, black, and white
- Mascot: Raven
- Website: riogrande.aps.edu

Rio Grande High School is a public high school located in the south valley of Albuquerque, New Mexico, United States. It is part of the Albuquerque Public Schools system.

== Athletics ==
RGHS competes in the New Mexico Activities Association (NMAA), as a class 6A school in District 5. In 2014, the NMAA realigned the state's schools in to six classifications and adjusted district boundaries. Other schools in District 5-6A include West Mesa High School, Albuquerque High School, Valley High School and Atrisco Heritage Academy High School.

The Ravens have talented baseball and wrestling teams. The wrestlers have placed second in state in recent years.

== Notable alumni ==
- Shelia Burrell (class of 1990), Olympic heptathlete
- Ken Giles - pitcher for the San Francisco Giants
- Greg Jackson - Head Coach and strategist for his Submission Fighting and mixed martial art camp
- Fernando Padilla Jr. - artist
