= Bill Glass Jr. =

Cherokee Nation artist

- Citizenship: Cherokee Nation and American
- Education: Central State University, Institute of American Indian Arts
- Known for: ceramics, public art
- Notable work: The Passage (2003)
- Style: Southeastern Woodlands
- Children: Demos Glass
- Awards: Cherokee National Treasure (2009), Red Earth Honored One (2012)
- Patrons: First Americans Museum
- Website: bdglassstudio.com

Bill Glass Jr. is a Cherokee Nation ceramic artist, sculptor, and public artist, who was named a Cherokee National Treasure in 2009.

== Background and education ==
Glass was born in Tahlequah, Oklahoma, and spent his childhood there and in Arizona. The Native art Glass saw while living in Arizona instilled a love of native culture and art in him.

He attended Central State University in Edmond, Oklahoma in 1973, where he decided to major in computer science. Glass took several art classes during his first year at Central State University under the direction of T.C. Cannon (Kiowa/Caddo, 1946–1978) and Sherman Chaddlesone (Kiowa, 1947–2013), who had both studied at the Institute of American Indian Arts (IAIA) in Santa Fe, New Mexico. Glass transferred to IAIA in 1973, where he worked under renowned Chiricahua Apache sculptor Allan Houser (1914–1994). While there, the faculty encouraged him to research his Cherokee heritage.

== Early career ==
After graduating from IAIA, Glass returned to Oklahoma to work for the Cherokee Nation as an art program coordinator. He worked there for several years in the late 1970s. During this time, Glass coordinated arts and crafts workshops for the Cherokee Nation, occasionally attended schools to share art with young students, and demonstrated art techniques.

== Art career ==
After working as art coordinator for several years, Glass turned to his own art full time in 1977. Glass uses Georgia clay, which allows him to fire at higher temperatures than locally sourced clays. Higher glazing temperatures then allow for a wider range of glazing colors. His work is inspired by the art of the Southeastern Woodlands people during the Mississippian era. During this era, Willard Stone (1916–1985) and Cecil Dick (Cherokee Nation, 1915–1992) served as Glass' mentors.

Glass exhibited nationally and garnered awards at the Santa Fe Indian Market, Heard Museum Guild Fair, Philbrook Indian Annual, Tulsa Indian Art Festival, Cherokee Art Market, and Artesian Arts Festival.

Bill Glass is the father of artist Demos Glass, and in the early millennium the father-son team began to build public sculptures together. The two share a large studio where they can craft their public pieces. The two convened Team Gadugi, an intertribal group of artists to create the public sculptural installation, The Passage (2003) about the Trail of Tears in Chattanooga, Tennessee. Father and son also sculpted Touched to Above for the First Americans Museum in Oklahoma City, Oklahoma.

Glass led a team of artists to create Origins, an installation at the Cherokee National History Museum in downtown Tahlequah, that depicts Cherokee oral history of an ancient migration.

== Awards and honors ==
The Five Civilized Tribes Museum in Muskogee, Oklahoma, named Glass a Master Artist in 1986. In 2009, the Cherokee Nation named Glass as a Cherokee National Treasure. The Red Earth Festival named him their Honored One in 2012. The Tulsa Indian Art Festival named him their Honored Elder Artist in 2015.

== Arts advocacy ==
Glass was a founding member of the Cherokee Artists Association that expanded to become the Southeastern Indian Artists Association, a Tahlequah-based nonprofit organization.

== Personal ==
As of 2007, Glass lived near Locust Grove, Oklahoma.
