= Mike Dart =

Cherokee basket weaver from Oklahoma

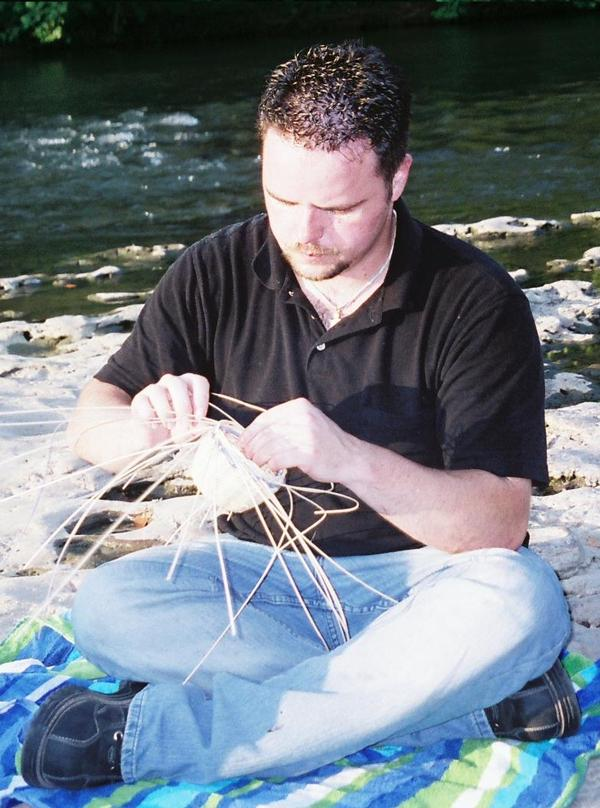
- Dart c. 2007
- Born: Michael Lee Dart; February 1, 1977; Siloam Springs, Arkansas, U.S.
- Education: Self-taught
- Known for: Basket weaving
- Movement: Basketry
- Awards: Cherokee National Treasure (2017)

Michael Lee Dart (born February 1, 1977) is a Native American basket weaver and citizen of the Cherokee Nation, who lives in Oklahoma.

== Background ==
Michael Dart was born on February 1, 1977, in Siloam Springs, Arkansas. He is based in Adair County, Oklahoma. Growing up, he watched his grandmother Pauline Dart weave baskets and build woven furniture from willow, hickory and other materials native to the land around her home. He took up basketry at age 16.

== Basket weaving ==
Dart is a Cherokee artist, specializing in the art of double-wall basketry, a difficult technique involving the continuous weaving of both an interior and an exterior wall within each basket.

He learned the art of basketry in 1992 from weaver Shawna Morton-Cain, also a Cherokee National Treasure.

Dart's baskets often uses commercial rattan reed and brightly colored aniline dyes. However, he also gathers, processes, and weaves with local materials such as honeysuckle and buckbrush (Symphoricarpos orbiculatus). He also uses natural dyes such as black walnut hulls, bloodroot, and Osage orange wood.

Using commercial materials permits him to experiment more freely, and there are certain colors he likes to use that cannot be obtained from local natural dyes. He defines the difference between traditional and contemporary as the following: "A Cherokee basket is classified as traditional if it is woven in a traditional way, and all the materials and dyed are natural. A Cherokee basket is classified as contemporary if it is woven in a traditional way using commercially manufactured materials and dyes. Some weavers will use both natural and commercial materials. This is called using 'mixed mediums' and it fits into the contemporary category."

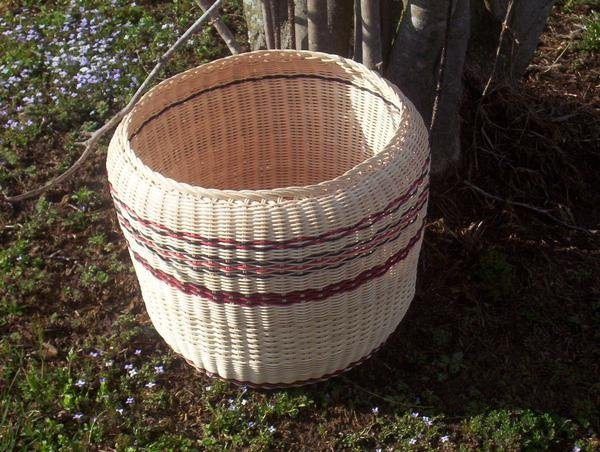
"War Cry" by Mike Dart

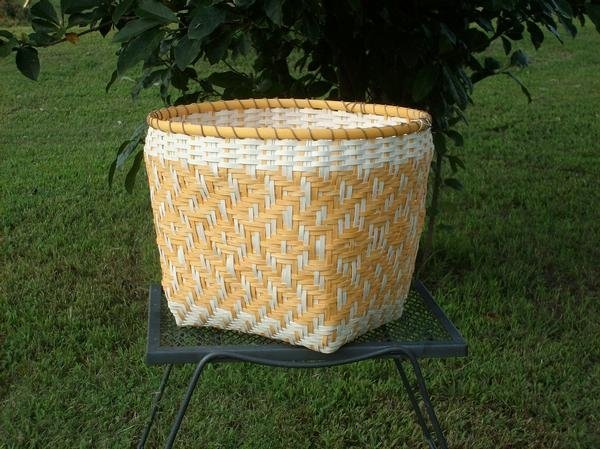
"Large Gathering Basket" by Mike Dart

== Art career ==
Dart's baskets have earned prizes throughout northeastern Oklahoma. These include the Cherokee National Holiday Art Show in Tahlequah, Oklahoma, the Art Under the Oaks Art Show at the Five Tribes Museum in Muskogee, Oklahoma, and one of the largest Native American art shows in the region, the Trail of Tears Art Show and Sale at the Cherokee Heritage Center in Park Hill, Oklahoma. In 2016, he presented a replica of a wood splint burden basket at the Chickasaw Nation's Artesian Art Market, where it won "Best of Show" and was featured in the book Oklahoma Cherokee Baskets. Dart also exhibits his baskets and has won recognition in Native American art markets nationally.

In 2017, Dart was designated a Cherokee National Living Treasure for his skill in creating traditional and contemporary basketry using traditional materials and for the promotion, Perpetuation and Education of Cherokee Basketry to Cherokee Citizens. He received the award from former Principal Chief Bill John Baker.

Dart's work has been exhibited in the Cherokee National Museum during various art shows, and also in the Cherokee Heritage Center in Park Hill, Oklahoma.

== See also ==
- List of Native American artists
- List of Native American artists from Oklahoma
- Visual arts by indigenous peoples of the Americas
