= Joseph L. Erb =

Native American computer animator, educator and artist

- Born: January 7, 1974 (age 52); United States
- Education: University of Pennsylvania (MFA)
- Known for: Filmmaking, sculpture, painting

Joseph Erb (born January 7, 1974) is a Native American computer animator, educator, and artist and a member of the Cherokee Nation.

== Background ==
Joseph Erb was born on January 7, 1974, and currently lives in Gore, Oklahoma. He earned his Master of Fine Arts degree from the University of Pennsylvania. He used his artistic skills to teach Muscogee Creek and Cherokee students how to animate traditional stories. He currently serves on the board of the Cherokee Arts and Humanities Council.

== Animation for language preservation ==
Erb created the first Cherokee animation in the Cherokee language, The Beginning They Told. The 11-minute animated piece relays parts of the Cherokee's creation story, featuring Buzzard, Beaver, and the Water Beetle, who brings fire to humanity.

He combines traditional storytelling with 21st-century technology as a means of teaching the Cherokee language to young people. His work has frequently been screened by the National Museum of the American Indian. "We're competing with mass culture," Erb says. "The kids have a choice; they can watch our animation or they can watch Elmo. You have to compete with all of that so the children will want to know their traditional stories and their language."

Besides collaborating with students to produce animation in their tribal languages, Erb also produce educational material, such as animated shorts of animals singing numbers and colors in Cherokee. The animated format provides a solution for the challenge of relaying what is traditional oral history to the next generation.

Erb trained and mentors his colleagues, Roy Boney Jr. (Cherokee Nation), Matt Mason (Cherokee) and Nathan Young (Pawnee-Delaware-Kiowa), and together their work has established Tahlequah, Oklahoma as the "Indian Animation Capital".

His work is shown at Native film festival throughout the United States and currently his work is supported in part by the Cherokee Nation. Mason, Boney, and Erb formed a production company called Cherokee Robot.

Erb's collaboration with students has led to some surprising new developments in the retelling of oral histories. Muscogee Creek middle school students and Erb created a video that combined animation, claymation and diorama sets to tell the story of Indian Removal. Their account has the Muscogee Creeks, freezing on the Trail of Tears, traveling through space to Paris, France, where beret-wearing Frenchmen teach the Creeks to stomp dance. Rabbit, the Muscogee Trickster, steals a coal of fire from the French and takes it back to the Creeks on their way to Indian Territory.

In 2023, Erb debuted Rabbit Stories, an animated short film in the Cherokee language. The film stars Wes Studi.

== Visual art ==
Erb is also a fine artist. He addresses contemporary realities facing Indian people through his sculpture, paintings, and jewelry. The Cherokee Heritage Center in Park Hill, Oklahoma frequently exhibits his work. Several of his paintings are a part of the permanent collection at the Sequoyah National Research Center in Little Rock, Arkansas.

== Videography ==
- Rabbit Stories (2023) director
- "Trail of Tears" (2009) producer
- Hero (2007)
- Day and Night (2005) director
- Messenger (2004) director
- How the Rabbit Lost His Tail (2003) producer
- How the Redbird Got His Color (2003) producer
- Mapohiceto/Not Listening (2003) producer
- The Beginning They Told (2003) producer, director
