= Martha Berry (artist) =

American artist

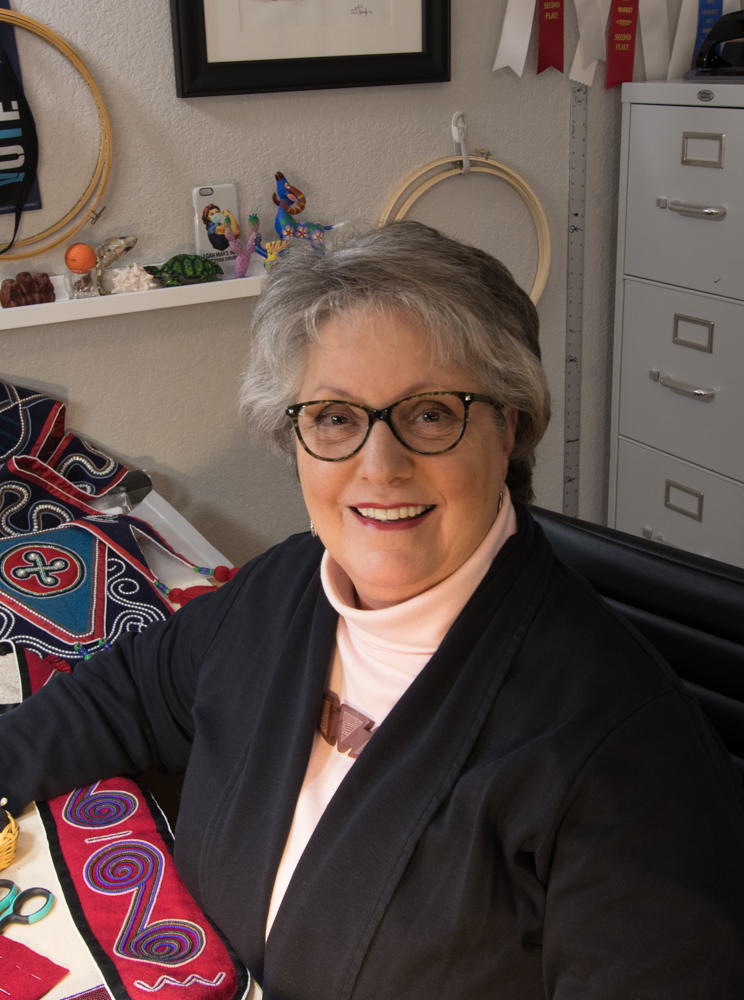
- Born: Oklahoma, United States
- Education: Family, self-taught
- Known for: Beadwork
- Style: Southeastern Woodland beadwork
- Movement: Traditional Southeastern beadwork
- Awards: Cherokee National Treasure, 2013; Cherokee Nation Tradition Bearer Award, 2015; Cherokee Nation "Honored Elder," 2023; Delegate to the Cherokee Nation Constitution Convention, 1999; 2001 Cherokee Nation Presenter, John F. Kennedy School of Governance, Tribes Moving Forward Conference.
- Website: http://www.berrybeadwork.com/

Martha Berry is a Cherokee beadwork artist who has revived traditional Cherokee and Southeastern beadwork, particularly techniques from the pre-Removal period. She has been recognized as a Cherokee National Treasure and is the recipient of the Seven Star and Tradition Bearer Awards. Her work is shown in museums around the United States.

== Background ==
Martha Berry was born in 1948 and raised in Tulsa, Oklahoma. She is a registered tribal citizen of the Cherokee Nation. Berry's grandmother and mother taught her how to sew and embroider at age five. She made her own clothes by age nine. When she was 20, she became a professional seamstress. She has expanded her skills by developing elaborate beadwork art. She taught herself the lost art of Cherokee beadwork by studying photographs of artifacts and examining Cherokee beaded artifacts at the Smithsonian Institution.

== Artwork ==
Berry creates beaded bandolier bags, moccasins, belts, knee bands, purses and sashes. She often uses beadwork designs that evolved from pre-Contact Mississippian pottery into traditional 18th and 19th century Southeastern beadwork. Berry discovered a unique stitch only used on Southeastern sashes. She is credited with reviving the art of Cherokee beadwork, which had been in serious decline for many years. Her art, expressed through utilitarian items, demonstrates themes such as duality and change throughout life. Berry's beadwork also expresses "current day feelings of conflict, loss, distortion and confusion." After she was recognized as a Cherokee National Treasure, she discussed her work: "I want to make beautiful things. I want to teach more and more people to do the same, and I want to grow more and more teachers of traditional Cherokee beadwork."

== Projects ==
Berry participated in the Native American Community Scholars Grant Program of the Smithsonian Institution. She has visited their collections to do further research into pre-Removal Southeastern beadwork, which has informed her own work.

Berry in 2008 curated Beadwork Storytellers: A Visual Language, a Cherokee beadwork exhibition at the Cherokee Heritage Center in Park Hill, Oklahoma. The exhibition included beadwork from the collection of Scotland's University of Aberdeen Museums that had not been seen in the United States in almost two centuries. Berry also wrote the text for the show catalog.

== Personal ==
Berry lives in Rowlett, Texas with her husband, Dave, a retired journalist. They have two daughters.

Berry served as a delegate to the 1999 Cherokee Nation Constitution Convention in Tahlequah, Oklahoma. Her role in the convention helped the Cherokee Nation in Oklahoma heal itself and "reassert itself as a capable sovereign in Oklahoma." She is currently an active member of several Cherokee organizations.
