= America Meredith =

American painter

- Born: 1972 (age 53–54)
- Citizenship: Cherokee Nation and American
- Education: MFA San Francisco Art Institute, BFA University of Oklahoma, University of Science and Arts of Oklahoma, Institute of American Indian Arts
- Known for: art criticism, painting, curation
- Movement: Cherokee art
- Website: http://www.americameredith.com

America Meredith (Cherokee Nation) is a painter, curator, educator, and editor of First American Art Magazine. America Meredith is an artist and comes from a Swedish-Cherokee background who blends pop imagery from her childhood with European and Native American styles.

== Background ==
America Meredith was born in 1972 to Howard Meredith, a Cherokee author and American Indian Studies professor, and Mary Ellen Meredith, a Cherokee museum director and curator. Meredith's maternal grandfather was William Thomas Milam, a Cherokee photographer and aeronautical engineer from Oklahoma. Both of her grandmothers were Swedish-American. W. T. Milam's uncle was J. B. Milam, the Principal Chief of the Cherokee Nation, and his great-uncle was Will Rogers, a Cherokee humorist, actor, and movie producer.

During much of the 1990s, Meredith worked as a bike messenger in San Francisco, California, where she was active in the International Longshore and Warehouse Union Local 6's organizing campaign of the Bay Area urgent delivery industry.

Meredith earned her AA at City College of San Francisco; her BFA in painting from the University of Oklahoma in Norman, Oklahoma; and her MFA in painting from the San Francisco Art Institute in San Francisco, California in 1995. She also attended the University of Science and Arts of Oklahoma in Chickasha and the Institute of American Indian Arts in Santa Fe, New Mexico.

== Artwork ==
Meredith paints with acrylic, gouache, watercolor, and egg tempera. In the series, The Cherokee Spokespeople Project, handmade paintings and drawings illustrate Cherokee words that are reproduced as spokecards, which were distributed to cycle couriers and cyclists worldwide.

== Art career ==
In addition to her studio practice, Meredith curates shows such as Frybread and Roses: Art of Native American Labor (2006) and Freedom of Information: The FBI, Indian Country, and Surveillance, which she co-curated with Ishkoten Dougi (Jicarilla Apache) in 2010. At Ahalenia Studios in Santa Fe, Meredith and other Native American artists, such as Melissa Melero-Moose (Northern Paiute/Modoc) and Sam Haozous (Chiricahua Apache), curate shows "too edgy, too silly, or otherwise inappropriate for other local galleries."

In 2019, she co-curated with Jean Merz-Edwards Stories from the Land: Indigenous Voices Connecting within the Great Plains at the Birger Sandzén Memorial Gallery, and co-curated with Callie Chunestudy (Cherokee Nation) Earth Shakers: The Influence of Cherokee Women at the Cherokee Heritage Center.

== Honors ==
Northeastern State University named Meredith its 2018 Sequoyah Fellow. In 2006, Meredith tied for SF Weekly's Best Painter award. She was awarded with a Cultural Equity Individual Artist Grant from the San Francisco Arts Commission, and she participated in the National Museum of the American Indian visiting artist fellowship. She has received numerous awards in juried art shows at the Cherokee Heritage Center, SWAIA's Santa Fe Indian Market, the Heard Museum, and others, including the 2007 IAIA Distinguished Alumni Award - For Excellence in Contemporary Native American Arts. In 2025, Meredith was awarded a Rabkin Prize fellowship for her writing and as the publishing editor of First American Art Magazine from the Dorothea and Leo Rabkin Foundation.

== Personal ==
Meredith serves on the board of the Cherokee Arts and Humanities Council, a grassroots community organization based in northeastern Oklahoma. She is active in the movement to revitalize Indigenous languages. Meredith says she sees Indigenous tribal people as "the future, not the past, in our globalized world."

== Notable exhibitions ==
- 2019–21: Stretching the Canvas: Eight Decades of Native American Painting, National Museum of the American Indian George Gustav Heye Center, New York, NY
- 2019–20: Laughter and Resilience: Humor in Native American Art, Wheelwright Museum of the American Indian, Santa Fe, NM
- 2019–20: Hearts of Our People: Native Women Artists, Minneapolis Institute of Arts, Frist Art Museum, Renwick Gallery of the Smithsonian American Art Museum, and Philbrook Museum of Art
- 2019: Outspoken: Paintings by America Meredith, Bardo Arts Center, Western Carolina University, Cullowhee
- 2012-13: Octopus Dreams: Works on Paper by Contemporary Native American Artists, 516 Arts, Albuquerque, NM; Samara Regional Art Museum, Samara, Russia; Novosibirsk Biennial of Contemporary Graphic Arts, Novosibirsk State Art Museum, Novosibirsk, Russia; Togliatti Art Museum, Togliatti, Russia; Ekaterinburg Museum of Fine Arts, Ekaterinburg, Russia.
- 2010–14: Indigenous Brilliance: Contemporary Native American Art Exhibition, Highgate Institute, London, England (2012); Palazzo Vecchio, Seborga, Italy; Casa de la Señoría, Olocau, Spain (2013); Amsterdam; curated by Elijah Vandenberg and Lyle Toledo Yazzie.
- 2012: Reconquête par l'Art, Festival America de Vincennes 2012, La galerie Orenda, Vincennes, France
- 2012: Messengers, Rainmaker Art Gallery, Bristol, England, curated by Joanne Prince.
- 2012: Low-Rez: Native American Lowbrow Art, Santa Fe, NM
- 2009 United Nations Permanent Forum on Indigenous Issues Art Show. United Nations, New York, New York.
- 2006-7 Face to Face: Portraits by America Meredith. Wheelwright Museum of the American Indian, Santa Fe, New Mexico.
- 2007 Do Not Park Bicycles: Aboriginal Cycling Culture. Art Gallery of Southwestern Manitoba, Brandon, Manitoba, Canada.
- 2006 Native Pop. New Mexico Museum of Art, Santa Fe, New Mexico.
