= Lena Blackbird =

American Cherokee artist (1933–2021)

- Born: August 23, 1933; Cherokee County, Oklahoma, U.S.
- Died: December 6, 2021 (aged 88)
- Known for: Basket weaving

Lena Marie Blackbird (August 23, 1933 – December 6, 2021) was an American Cherokee artist who lived in Tahlequah, Oklahoma. She was best known for her Cherokee double-walled basket weaving. She was the first of the Cherokee basket makers to decorate the tops of her baskets and incorporate vases within her baskets. Blackbird's customary artist mark is seen in a chain pattern on the top of her baskets.

== Early life ==
Lena Blackbird was raised by her parents in Cherokee County, Oklahoma, where she attended school until grade eight. Blackbird was the sixth of eight children in the family. Her first language was Cherokee, making school in English a difficult task. After leaving school, she worked on the farm where the family lived. Her earliest exposure to the arts was in helping her mother sew quilt tops at church for missions work.

In 1986, Blackbird began work as a demonstrator at the Tsa-La-Gi Village at the Cherokee Heritage Center. It was there that she first learned the art of basket weaving. Blackbird learned using commercial reed from the other women that demonstrated the art for tourists. Almost immediately after she learned how to weave baskets, Blackbird began selling her artwork.

== Style ==
Blackbird's baskets are notable because she began adorning the top with acorns which caught on with other artists. Blackbird typically worked with commercial reed and honeysuckle rather than using the traditional natural reed.

== Awards ==
In 1996, Blackbird took the grand prize at the Art under the Oaks competition in Muskogee, Oklahoma, for her first basket entered in a show. The same year, she received the Cherokee Master Craftsman Award in basketry. The award, which launched in 1988, honors Cherokee who have perfected a traditional Cherokee cultural craft.

In 1998, she was named a Cherokee National Living Treasure for her basket weaving skill.

In 2001, Blackbird earned special merit for her honeysuckle basket at the Cherokee National Museum’s Trail of Tears Art Show and first place in the basketry division of the Cherokee Homecoming Art Show. Later the same year, she received the Cherokee Medal of Honor. The award was established in 1999 to recognize significant contributions to society by those of Cherokee descent.

Blackbird was honored again in 2004 at the ninth annual Cherokee Homecoming Art Show for her piece, Let Freedom Ring, which took first place in the contemporary division of basketry. Entry at this show is limited to artists who have membership in the Cherokee Nation, United Keetoowah Band or Eastern Band of Cherokees.

== Death ==
Blackbird died at the age of 88 on December 6, 2021, in Cherokee County, Oklahoma. She was laid to rest at Bill Batt Cemetery.
