= Wes Nofire =

Cherokee politician and boxer

Oklahoma Native American Affairs Liaison
- Incumbent
- Assumed office September 5, 2023
- Governor: Kevin Stitt
- Preceded by: Chris Benge

Member of the Cherokee Nation Tribal Council from the 3rd district
- In office August 14, 2019 – August 14, 2023
- Preceded by: David Walkingstick
- Succeeded by: Lisa Hall

Personal details
- Born: John Wesley Nofire; April 30, 1986 (age 39) Tahlequah, Oklahoma, U.S.
- Citizenship: Cherokee Nation; United States
- Party: Republican
- Nickname: "The Cherokee Warrior"

John Wesley "Wes" Nofire (born April 30, 1986) is a Cherokee Nation and American politician and a former heavyweight professional boxer who has served as the Oklahoma Native American Affairs Liaison since 2023. During his boxing career Nofire fought under the name "The Cherokee Warrior". Nofire served on the Cherokee Nation tribal council between 2019 and 2023. He was a Republican candidate in the 2022 primary election for Oklahoma's 2nd congressional district and candidate in the 2023 Cherokee Nation principal chief election.

== Early life ==
John Wesley Nofire was born on April 30, 1986, at W.W. Hastings Hospital in Tahlequah, Oklahoma, on the Cherokee Nation Reservation to Sherman and Annette Nofire.

Nofire grew up in the Welling area, and attended High school at Sequoyah High School in Tahlequah. Sequoyah High School is an all Native American High School operated by the Cherokee Nation and is funded by Bureau of Indian Education. Nofire was on the 2004 State Champion Basketball team for Sequoyah.

== Boxing career ==
Nofire, began boxing in 2007 as a way to stay physically fit. As an amateur, Nofire was named Oklahoma State Champion in the Super Heavyweight Division and went on to participate in the 2010 National Golden Gloves boxing tournament as the Kansas-Oklahoma regional representative.

In 2011, Nofire moved to Miami, Florida, where he met John David Jackson, a former two-time world champion. Jackson liked the natural speed and ability that Nofire brought to e encourage him to get in the ring. Nofire made his heavyweight debut on August 26, 2011, at The Joint's Xtreme Fight Night at the Hard Rock Hotel & Casino Tulsa. Nofire challenged MMA Fighter Marc Webb. Nofire knocked out Webb with an uppercut to the chin 1 minute and 22 seconds into the first round of the match. In his second career match up Nofire would defeat David Fuller in under 41 seconds

=== Nofire Entertainment ===
In 2013, Nofire began Nofire Entertainment Corporation, a fight promoting entertainment company. Nofire Entertainment's first event was the "Cherokee Fight Club" in 2013, a ten fight event hosted at the Hard Rock Hotel and Casino in Tulsa, Oklahoma.

=== Retirement from boxing ===
Nofire's last career fight was against Gerald Washington. Their match was on a Sunday edition of PBC on Fox Sports 1 on June 10, 2018. 32 year old Nofire (20–1, 16 KOs) entered the matching with his only loss came to veteran journeyman Joey Abell in 2016. The fight took place at the Pioneer Event Center in Lancaster, California. The 10-round bout was mostly back and forth. Washington started off fast, landing big shots and applying pressure on Nofire. In round 3, Nofire landed some hard shots on Washington, however he recovered and took over, landing his own big shots. Nofire slowed down after landing his big shots. Washington remained in control for most of the fight. The three judges scored the bout 98–91, 97–92, and 97–92 in favor of Washington, giving him the much needed win and snapping Washington's 2-fight losing streak.

== Political career ==
=== Cherokee Nation Tribal Council ===
==== Campaign ====
In December 2018, Nofire announced his intention for run for Cherokee Nation Tribal Council in District 3 seat, being vacated by David Walkingstick, who was running for Principal Chief. The Cheorkee Nation Tribal Council is a seventeen-member unicameral legislature of the tribal government. Nofire topped a field of seven candidates in the general election that occurred on June 1, 2019, advancing himself to the July Runoff. Nofire winning 29.47% of the votes, advanced to face off Cherokee County Democratic Party Chair, Debra Proctor (29.09% of the Vote) in a July 27 run off.

The runoff election was largely seen a proxy fight between the Hoskin/Warner faction and the Walkingstick/Frailey faction from 2019 Cherokee Nation principal chief election. Proctor was largely being supported by the Hoskin/Warner faction and Nofire being supported by the Walkingstick/Frailey faction. Nofire received endorsement from Incumbent David Walkingstick and former Cherokee Nation Principal Chad Smith . On Election Day, Nofire overcame Proctor winning 63.75% of the vote.

==== Tenure ====
During his tenure on the tribal council, Nofire frequently questioned the tribal sovereignty of the Cherokee Nation. He has claimed the Cherokee Nation "never legally established a jurisdictional court over the citizens of the Cherokee Nation,” cast doubt on the Cherokee Nation's criminal jurisdiction during council meetings, and accused principal chief Chuck Hoskin Jr. of using the Cherokee Marshall service for child trafficking. Hoskin described the allegations as "unhinged conspiracy theory.”

=== 2022 congressional campaign ===
Nofire ran for Oklahoma's 2nd congressional district in 2022. He was one of sixteen candidates for the seat in the Republican primary. During the campaign, Nofire was criticized by fellow Tribal Councilor Candessa Tehee for calling the McGirt v. Oklahoma decision "the biggest threat to Oklahomans” at a Bartlesville campaign stop. She described his statements as "border[ing] on being treasonous and traitorous to Cherokee Nation.” He placed seventh and failed to qualify for the runoff. Nofire endorsed Governor Kevin Stitt in his re-election campaign.

=== 2023 Cherokee Nation principal chief campaign ===
Nofire announced his intent to run for Principal Chief of the Cherokee Nation with Ryan Dirteater on his ticket as deputy chief. Dirteater later announced that he would not be submitting his paperwork to the election board. On February 9 Nofire filed for election with the Cherokee Nation Election Board without Dirteater on his ticket. He lost the election to incumbent principal chief Chuck Hoskin Jr.

=== Stitt administration appointments ===
On September 5, 2023, Nofire was appointed the Native American Affairs Liaison of Oklahoma by Governor Kevin Stitt. His appointment was criticized by Cherokee Nation officials with Chuck Hoskin Jr. calling it "disappointing" and Speaker of the Tribal Council Mike Shambaugh describing the appointment as "very disturbing." Shambaugh later published an op-ed in the Cherokee Phoenix comparing Nofire to General George Armstrong Custer's Native American scouts and criticizing his appointment because of his "peddl[ing] in fact-free unhinged and ideologically extreme conspiracy theories that pose a danger of political violence" such as the Jewish Indian theory, implying principal chief Hoskins is "the biblical 'beast'" otherwise known as Satan, and accusing the Cherokee Nation of child trafficking. The Inter-Tribal Council of the Five Civilized Tribes unanimously voted to approve a resolution expressing no confidence in Nofire and describing the Native American Affairs Liaison position as ineffective under Governor Stitt.

On April 8, 2024, Nofire was appointed to the Oklahoma State Athletic Commission. He was preceded in office by Terry L. Smith and his term runs until June 30, 2027. On October 2, 2025, Stitt announced he would appoint Nofire to the Oklahoma State Board of Education.

== Electoral history ==
2019 Cherokee Nation Tribal Council - District 3 General Election Results 6/1/2019
Candidate	Early Votes	Absentee Votes	Election Day Votes	Total votes	Total Percentage
RJ Robbins	17	20	76	113	10.74%
Debra Proctor	101	83	122	306	29.09%
Jim Cosby	29	10	64	103	9.79%
Brandon Girty	4	5	8	17	1.62%
Billy Flint	29	29	66	124	11.79%
Larry Dean Pritchett	22	12	45	79	7.51%
Wes Nofire	77	63	170	310	29.47%

Candidate	Early Votes	Absentee Votes	Election Day Votes	Total votes	Total Percentage
Wes Nofire	199	99	242	540	63.75%
Debra Proctor	128	85	94	307	36.25%

Republican primary results for Oklahoma's 2nd congressional district in 2022
Party	Candidate	Votes	%
Republican	Avery Frix	11,336	14.7
Republican	Josh Brecheen	10,579	13.8
Republican	Johnny Teehee	9,963	13.0
Republican	John Bennett	8,713	11.3
Republican	Guy Barker	8,444	11.0
Republican	Marty Quinn	5,612	7.3
Republican	Wes Nofire	4,859	6.3
Republican	David Derby	4,204	5.5
Republican	Chris Schiller	4,108	5.3
Republican	Dustin Roberts	3,746	4.9
Republican	Pamela Gordon	2,344	3.0
Republican	Rhonda Hopkins	1,281	1.7
Republican	Clint Johnson	1,128	1.5
Republican	Erick Wyatt	615	0.8
Total votes		76,932	100.0

2023 Cherokee Nation Principal Chief Election
Candidate	Votes	%
Chuck Hoskin Jr. (incumbent)	10,556	62.9%
Cara Cowan Watts	4,008	23.88%
Wes Nofire	1,673	9.97%
David Cornsilk	546	3.25%
Total votes	16,783	100%
