= 2023 Cherokee Nation deputy chief election =

- June 3, 2023
Candidate	Bryan Warner	David Walkingstick	Meredith Frailey
Popular vote	10,500	5,017	1,179
Percentage	61.43%	29.35%	6.90%
Deputy Chief before election
Bryan Warner
Elected Deputy Chief
Bryan Warner

The 2023 Cherokee Nation deputy chief election was held on June 3, 2023, concurrently with the 2023 Cherokee Nation tribal council elections and 2023 Cherokee Nation principal chief election, to elect the Deputy Chief of the Cherokee Nation. Incumbent deputy chief Bryan Warner ran for re-election to a second term in office with incumbent principal chief Chuck Hoskin Jr. as his running mate. (Note: Principal chief and deputy chief are elected separately, but some candidates campaign together as running mates.) Warner won re-election with over 61% of the vote.

== Candidates ==
- Meredith Frailey, former tribal councilor
- Bill Pearson, U.S. Navy veteran and chair of the Rogers County Republican Party
- David Walkingstick, former tribal councilor for District 3 (2011–2019)
  - Running mate: Cara Cowan Watts, former tribal councilor (2003–2015)
- Bryan Warner, incumbent deputy chief (2019–present) and former Cherokee Nation tribal councilor for District 6
  - Running mate: Chuck Hoskin Jr., incumbent principal chief (2019–present)

== Results ==
Candidate	Votes	%
Bryan Warner	10,500	61.43
David Walkingstick	5,017	29.35
Meredith Frailey	1,179	6.90
Bill Pearson	396	2.32
Total	17,092	100.00
Valid votes	17,092	99.52
Invalid/blank votes	83	0.48
Total votes	17,175	100.00

== Legal issues ==
The Cherokee Nation Election Commission rejected the candidacy of David Comingdeer for deputy chief for his failure to pay attorney's fees related to a case he brought during the 2021 Cherokee Nation elections.
