= Fullbright =

Fullbright is a surname. Notable people with the surname include:

- Janelle Fullbright (1945–2016), Cherokee politician and educator
- John Fullbright (born 1988), American singer-songwriter

== See also ==
- Fulbright (disambiguation)
