= Mike Shambaugh =

Cherokee Nation politician

Speaker of the Cherokee Nation Tribal Council
- In office August 26, 2021 – August 2025
- Preceded by: Joe Byrd
- Succeeded by: Johnny Jack Kidwell

Cherokee Nation Tribal Councilor for the 9th district
- In office August 14, 2017 – August 2025
- Preceded by: Curtis Snell
- Succeeded by: Clifton Hughes

Personal details
- Born: December 22, 1964 (age 61)
- Citizenship: American; Cherokee Nation
- Party: Democratic Party

Mike Shambaugh (born December 22, 1964) is an American and Cherokee Nation politician, baseball player, and police officer who has served on the Cherokee Nation Tribal Council representing the 9th district since 2017 and as speaker of the Cherokee Nation tribal council since 2021.

== Early life, education, and baseball career ==
Mike Shambaugh was born on December 22, 1964. He was raised in Jay, Oklahoma and graduated from Jay High School. He attended Oral Roberts University, but he did not graduate.

=== Baseball career ===
Shambaugh played on the Oral Roberts Golden Eagles baseball team from 1984 to 1987. He was selected by Collegiate Baseball magazine as one of their pre-season All-American team members in 1986. He played in the National Baseball Congress World Series championship games in 1984, 1985, 1986, and 1987. The first two years for Liberal, Kansas, followed by the Anchorage Glacier Pilots, and finally for the Wichita Broncos. His team won the championship in 1985 and 1986. In 1988, he signed with the Boise Hawks for a season. In 1990, The Oklahoman named him as one of the 1980s "all-decade" Oklahoma high school baseball team members. Shambaugh retired early from baseball after an injury.

== Police career and campaigns for sheriff ==
After retiring from baseball, Shambaugh returned to his hometown of Jay, Oklahoma in Delaware County to work as a police officer. In 2000, he ran for Delaware County sheriff in the Democratic primary against Lynden Woodruff, Jerry Littlefield, and Mike Dilbeck. Shambaugh and Woodruff advanced to a runoff, which Shambaugh lost receiving 46% of the vote. By 2003, Shambaugh served as Jay Chief of Police. Woodruff would later resign as Delaware County Sheriff after pleading guilty to driving under the influence; after his replacement, Rick White, was criticized for a racist joke during a stump speech in 2004, Shambaugh forwarded five complaints his office had received against White to the district attorney. In 2007, Shambaugh was Jay Chief of Police during the 2007 ice storm, during which half the city did not have power and the area was under a Boil-water advisory.

In 2016, Shambaugh ran Delaware County sheriff as the Democratic Party's nominee; after incumbent Harlan Moore won the election by seven votes, Shambaugh requested a recount. After the recount he lost the election by 5 votes.

== Cherokee Nation tribal council ==
In 2017, Shambaugh filed to run for the 9th district of Cherokee Nation tribal council. Incumbent Curtis Snell was term-limited and four candidates filed for the general election: Shambaugh, Anthony Cochran, Edward Crawford, and Clifton Hughes. He advanced to a runoff election alongside Hughes after leading in the general election. Shambaugh went on to win the runoff election with 55% of the vote. He was sworn into office on August 14, 2017.

On August 13, 2020, after the McGirt v. Oklahoma decision, principal chief Chuck Hoskin Jr. appointed Shambaugh to the Commission for the Protection of Cherokee Nation Sovereignty to examine the effects of the decision and make recommendations to the nation on how to allocate resources.

In June 2021, Shambaugh ran for re-election and faced challengers Lawrence Panther and Joyce Nix McCarter. He won re-election with 59% of the vote. He was sworn in for his second term on August 14. On August 26, he was elected speaker of Cherokee Nation tribal council and Victoria Vazquez was elected as vice-speaker.

In 2022, Shambaugh criticized the Oklahoma v. Castro-Huerta decision as "another broken promise."

In 2023 after Governor Kevin Stitt appointed former Cherokee Nation tribal councilor Wes Nofire as the Oklahoma Native American Affairs Liaison, Shambaugh published an op-ed in the Cherokee Phoenix comparing Nofire to General George Armstrong Custer's Native American scouts and criticizing his appointment because of his "peddl[ing] in fact-free unhinged and ideologically extreme conspiracy theories that pose a danger of political violence" such as the Jewish Indian theory, implying principal chief Hoskins is "the biblical 'beast'" otherwise known as Satan, and accusing the Cherokee Nation of "child trafficking."

He left the council on August 14, 2025, and was succeeded by Clifton Hughes. Johnny Jack Kidwell was elected to succeed him as council speaker.

After leaving the council, he was appointed by Principal Chief Chuck Hoskin Jr. as the Cherokee Nation's Special Envoy to the U.S. Department of Justice and as a Senior Advisor on Public Safety.
