= 2023 Cherokee Nation elections =

2023 Cherokee Nation elections may refer to:

- 2023 Cherokee Nation principal chief election
- 2023 Cherokee Nation deputy chief election
- 2023 Cherokee Nation tribal council elections
