= 2023 Cherokee Nation principal chief election =

- June 3, 2023
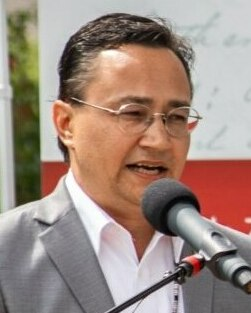

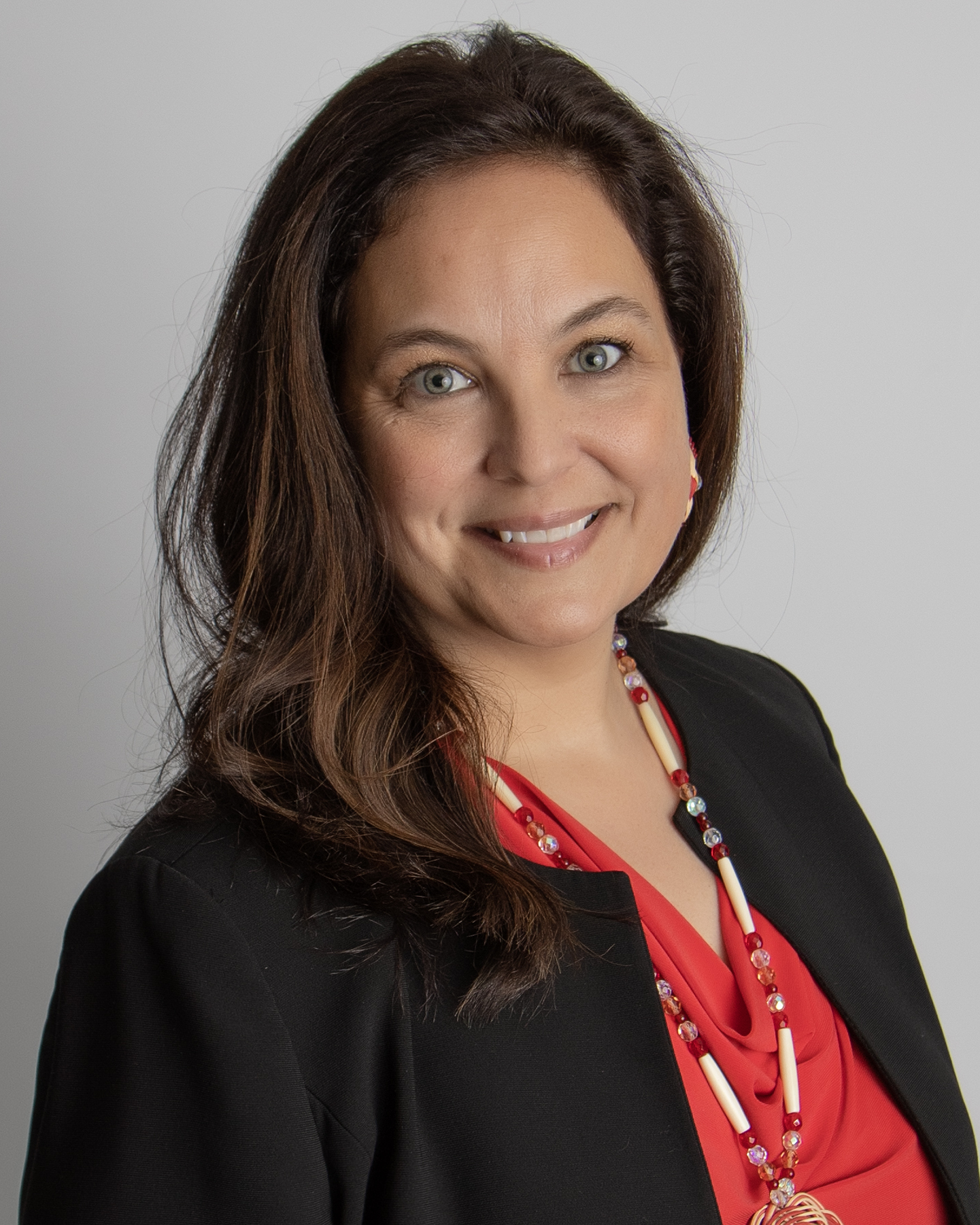

Candidate	Chuck Hoskin Jr.	Cara Cowan Watts	Wes Nofire
Popular vote	10,756	4,095	1,720
Percentage	62.76%	23.89%	10.04%
Principal Chief before election
Chuck Hoskin Jr.
Elected Principal Chief
Chuck Hoskin Jr.

The 2023 Cherokee Nation principal chief election was held on June 3, 2023, concurrently with the 2023 Cherokee Nation tribal council elections and 2023 Cherokee Nation deputy chief election, to elect the Principal Chief of the Cherokee Nation. Incumbent principal chief Chuck Hoskin Jr. ran for re-election to a second term in office with incumbent deputy chief Bryan Warner as his running mate and was re-elected to a second term. (Note: Principal chief and deputy chief are elected separately, but some candidates campaign together as running mates.)

== Candidates ==
=== Declared ===
- David Cornsilk, genealogist and former Bureau of Indian Affairs researcher
- Cara Cowan Watts, former Deputy Speaker of the Cherokee Nation Tribal Council and candidate for principal chief in 2015
  - Running mate: David Walkingstick, former tribal councilor and candidate for principal chief in 2019
- Chuck Hoskin Jr., incumbent principal chief
  - Running mate: Bryan Warner, incumbent deputy chief
- Wes Nofire, tribal councilor and candidate for Oklahoma's 2nd congressional district in 2022

== Campaign ==
Chuck Hoskin Jr. pledged that if re-elected, he would continue his work preserving the Cherokee language, building more hospitals, providing job training for Cherokee citizens, and addressing the opioid crisis. Cara Cowan Watts touted her status as the only woman in the race; if elected, she would be the Cherokee Nation's first female principal chief since 2011. She promised to address the healthcare worker shortage while also improving education and housing. Wes Nofire said his top priority would be to reduce wasteful spending by the Cherokee government. David Cornsilk pledged to reform the tribal court system and increase access to healthcare and housing.

Hoskin's challengers accused him of mismanaging COVID relief funds, giving unnecessary pay raises to elected officials, not doing enough to preserve Cherokee culture, and failing to ensure adequate staffing at healthcare facilities. He defended his record on these issues, though he also acknowledged the staffing issue and proposed expanding telehealth.

=== Legal issues ===
Cara Cowan Watts and David Walkingstick's campaigns were barred by the Cherokee Nation district court from operating a "registration checker" on their campaign website that allowed users to look up Cherokee voters' names and addresses by an injunction after the court ruled its operation violated the Cherokee Nation Election Law and Privacy Act. Walkingstick's attorney, former Cherokee Nation principal chief Chad Smith, described the ruling as a "political stunt."

== Results ==
Candidate	Votes	%
Chuck Hoskin Jr.	10,756	62.76
Cara Cowan Watts	4,095	23.89
Wes Nofire	1,720	10.04
David Cornsilk	568	3.31
Total	17,139	100.00
Valid votes	17,139	99.79
Invalid/blank votes	36	0.21
Total votes	17,175	100.00
