= David Cornsilk =

Cherokee genealogist and activist from Oklahoma

- Born: February 10, 1959 (age 67); Claremore, Oklahoma, U.S.
- Education: Northeastern State University, Tahlequah (BS)
- Occupations: Genealogist, writer
- Years active: 1992–present
- Known for: Advocacy for the Cherokee Freedmen
- Political party: Independent
- Movement: Cherokee nationalism

David Cornsilk (Cherokee Nation and United Keetoowah Band of Cherokee Indians) is a professional genealogist and served as the managing editor of the Cherokee Observer, an online news website founded in 1992. He founded the grassroots Cherokee National Party in the 1990s, seeking to create a movement to promote the Nation as a political entity. While working as a full-time store clerk at Petsmart, he "took on America's second-largest Indian tribe, the Cherokee Nation, in what led to a landmark tribal decision. Cornsilk served as a lay advocate, which permits non-lawyers to try cases before the Cherokee Nation's highest court." Cornsilk had worked for the nation as a tribal enrollment research analyst and for the Bureau of Indian Affairs as a genealogical researcher. He also has his own genealogical firm. He ran in the 2023 Cherokee Nation principal chief election. He lost the election to incumbent principal chief Chuck Hoskin Jr.

== Cherokee Freedmen advocacy ==
In the longstanding Cherokee Freedmen controversy, Cornsilk has promoted inclusion of Freedmen descendants in the Nation because they were made citizens in 1866 by treaty with the United States. He believes the Nation needs to stand as a political entity, be large enough to include the people in its jurisdiction, and honor its obligation to the Freedmen descendants. As he wrote,

"Anyone with some micro-thin strain of Cherokee blood should be thanking the Freedmen because they have proven that our citizenship is not based on blood or any anthropological definition of "Indian" but is a legal concept rooted in the right of the Cherokee people to determine who is and who is not a Cherokee."

At the same time, he believes that the Cherokee citizens have the right to determine who shall be citizens. He was against the tribal court changing the language in the constitution to allow for Marilyn Vann, a Freedman citizen running for office on the tribal council, to be allowed to run, believing instead that it should have been put to a vote.

== Other contributions and opinions ==
Cornsilk was a delegate to the 1999 Cherokee Nation Constitutional Convention.

Cornsilk was among Indigenous writers who commented in July 2015 on the controversy over fluctuating claims to Cherokee identity by Andrea Smith, associate professor at University of California, Riverside. He rejected her claim of being able to determine independently that she was Cherokee, saying that citizenship by law and custom was based on recognition and acceptance by other Cherokee, and that the Cherokee are very well-documented people. He noted that he could find no documentation to support her claim of Cherokee ancestry. Smith originally hired Cornsilk to research her family tree, but later she was outed by others after he could find no native ancestor. This prompted him to "speak publicly about his genealogical work for Smith; and with him as a key source, The Daily Beast ran an article calling Smith the 'Native American Rachel Dolezal.'"

== Sexuality ==
David Cornsilk is openly gay, and came out following the death of his father, John Cornsilks, in 2020. He is also a gay rights advocate and has lobbied for gay marriage in the Cherokee Nation and United Keetoowah Band of Cherokee Indians.

== Dismissal from Cherokee Nation Registration department ==
David Cornsilk was dismissed from his position at the Cherokee Nation Registration Department after he was alleged to have posted private information of Cara Cowan Watts, a Cherokee Nation Council member, in order to publicly disparage her.

== Electoral history ==
2023 Cherokee Nation Principal Chief Election
| Candidate | Votes | % |
|---|---|---|
| Chuck Hoskin Jr. (incumbent) | 10,556 | 62.9% |
| Cara Cowan Watts | 4,008 | 23.88% |
| Wes Nofire | 1,673 | 9.97% |
| David Cornsilk | 546 | 3.25% |
| Total votes | 16,783 | 100% |

== See also ==
- Cherokee Freedmen controversy
- Chuck Hoskin Jr.
- Wilma Mankiller
