= 2019 Cherokee Nation principal chief election =

- June 1, 2019
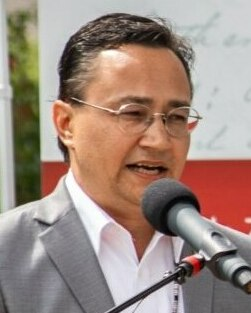

Candidate	Chuck Hoskin Jr.	Dick Lay	David Walkingstick (disqualified)
Running mate	Bryan Warner	none	Meredith Frailey
Popular vote	7,933	3,856	2,006
Percentage	57.51%	27.95%	14.54%
Principal Chief before election
Bill John Baker
Elected Principal Chief
Chuck Hoskin, Jr.

The 2019 Cherokee Nation of Oklahoma principal chief election was held on Saturday, June 1, 2019. Former Cherokee Nation Secretary of State Chuck Hoskin Jr. defeated Tribal Councilman Dick Lay in the election.

A third candidate, Tribal Councilman David Walkingstick, also appeared on the ballot, but was disqualified due to campaign finance violations days before the election. Rhonda Brown-Fleming, the first Cherokee Freedman descendant to run for principal chief, was disqualified in March after the Cherokee Nation Supreme Court ruled she did not meet tribal residency requirements. Federal courts affirmed the decision just before the election.

The principal chief is the chief executive of the Cherokee Nation. Incumbent Principal Chief Bill John Baker was unable to seek re-election in 2019 due to term limits.

== Election results ==
Hoskin won the election with 57.93% of the vote. Lay received 27.34% while Walkingstick, whose name was on ballot but was disqualified after absentee and early voting had begun, took 14.73%. Despite being disqualified, votes for Walkingstick were tallied to determine whether or not a runoff would be needed. Nearly 14,000 ballots were cast in the election. In the race for Deputy Chief, Bryan Warner defeated former Tribal Council Speaker Meredith Frailey 58.88% to 41.12%. (Although candidates for principal chief and deputy chief run together, they are voted upon separately.)

Candidate	Votes	%
Chuck Hoskin Jr.	7,933	57.51
Dick Lay	3,856	27.95
David Walkingstick	2,006	14.54
Total	13,795	100.00
Valid votes	13,795	99.46
Invalid/blank votes	75	0.54
Total votes	13,870	100.00
Registered voters/turnout	72,781	19.06

== Controversies ==
Walkingstick controversy

Cherokee Nation elections are officially non-partisan, but the 2019 elections had heavy partisan overtones, with Walkingstick criticizing Hoskin and incumbent Baker's ties to the Democratic Party and calling for the Cherokee Nation to distance itself from Democrats. Walkingstick had early in the campaign expressed concerns about oversight, and called for federal officials to monitor the 2019 elections.

Despite Cherokee law allowing campaign contributions only from individuals, a political action committee, Cherokees for Change LLC, was established by one of Walkingstick's campaign associates. Cherokees for Change argued that its funding and actions were allowed following the U.S. Supreme Court's ruling in Citizens United v. FEC. The Cherokee Nation Election Commission disagreed and on May 6 ordered Cherokees for Change to cease its efforts to influence the election, which it determined to be in violation of tribal law. Although Walkingstick claimed no coordination existed between the PAC and his campaign, election officials determined he had violated tribal law and accepted donations from corporate entities on May 17. Walkingstick was disqualified from the election, although his name remained on the ballot. The Cherokee Supreme Court upheld the disqualification on May 29. Walkingstick subsequently threw his support behind Lay. Because Walkingstick was disqualified at such a late date, his name remained on the ballot; however, votes cast for him were not counted.

Cherokee Futures LLC

During the 2019 election, Cherokee Future LLC was an Oklahoma Domestic Limited Liability Company owned by Chuck Hoskin Sr, the father of then Candidate Chuck Hoskin Jr., and was registered to an empty lot in Hoskin's home town of Vinta. The Hoskin/Warner campaign and several tribal council candidates showed significant spending of their campaign budget to the Cherokee Future. The Hoskin/Warner campaign reported $574,016.42 as miscellaneous campaign expenditures going to Cherokee Future LLC. And of that amount, $375,000 is noted as consultant fees, while the advertisement expenditure for the first two financial reporting periods was $7,499. Despite numerous complaints filed with the Cherokee Nation Election Commission, no action was taken by the Election Commission. Ultimately, the Election Commission's lack of action led to a twin lawsuit before the Cherokee Nation Supreme Court, Lay v CN Election Commission and Frailey v CN Election Commission. Ultimately the twin suits were unsuccessful in overturning the election.

== Challenge to results ==
Following the June 1 election, Lay and Frailey petitioned the Cherokee Nation Supreme Court to set aside the results and to order a new election. The petitioners accused the winning candidates of accepting illegal in-kind contributions and other campaign finance violations; however, the Cherokee Supreme Court found the complaints to be without merit.
