= Joshua Lee =

Joshua or Josh Lee may refer to:

- Joshua Lee (New York politician) (1783–1842), United States Representative from New York
- Joshua B. Lee (1892–1967), United States Representative and Senator from Oklahoma
- Josh D. Lee (born 1979), American lawyer
