= Marilyn Vann =

Cherokee Nation engineer and activist

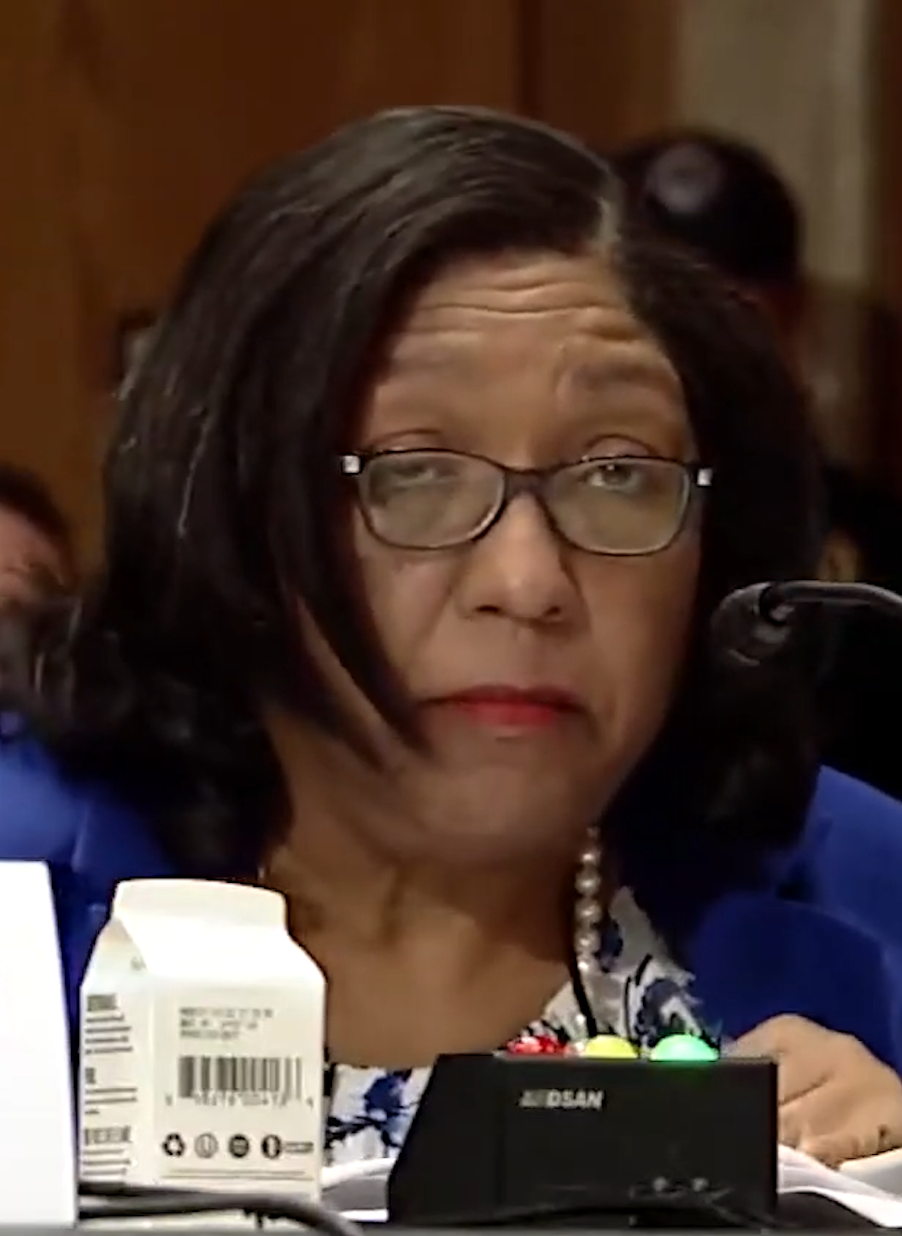
- Vann in 2022
- Born: Oklahoma, U.S.
- Citizenship: Cherokee Nation; United States
- Education: University of Oklahoma

Marilyn Vann is a Cherokee Nation engineer and activist who is the first citizen of Freedmen descent to be appointed to a government commission within the Cherokee Nation. She has served on the Cherokee Nation Environmental Protection Commission since 2021.

== Early life and education ==
Vann was born in Oklahoma and grew up in Ponca City, Oklahoma, in a poor family. Her father was a Baptist deacon who emphasized the importance of hard work. From a young age, Vann knew she was of mixed African and Cherokee ancestry. Her father had received land as a member of the Cherokee Nation. She attended the University of Oklahoma, where she graduated with distinction, earning a degree in engineering.

== Career ==
Vann worked for the U.S. Treasury Department in Oklahoma for 32 years. Her time at the Treasury Department included 8 years as a team leader with short-term management assignments. Her responsibilities involved team building, training new employees, revising government regulations and training materials, and negotiating on behalf of the government. She also made hiring recommendations, conducted real estate and oil and gas appraisals, and wrote expert reports. Upon retirement, she received the Albert Gallatin Award, the Treasury Department's highest career service honor.

In 2001, she applied for citizenship in the Cherokee Nation but was denied because her ancestor was listed as a Freedman on the Dawes Rolls without a "degree of Indian blood" designation. In 2003, Vann filed a lawsuit against the U.S. government, asking them to enforce the 1866 Treaty that granted citizenship rights to Cherokee Freedmen and their descendants. Her case made its way through federal courts for years. Vann became a tribal citizen in 2006 following a ruling by the Cherokee Nation Supreme Court. Vann organized meetings of Freedmen descendants to discuss strategies for securing their citizenship rights. She is the founding president of the Descendants of Freedmen of the Five Civilized Tribes Association, which has worked for over twenty years to address issues of racial discrimination and secure rights for Freedmen descendants in the Cherokee Nation and other tribal nations. She worked with genealogist David Cornsilk and others to advance the cause through both federal and tribal courts. In 2017, Vann's federal lawsuit, Cherokee Nation v. Nash, was successful, with the court ruling in favor of citizenship rights for Freedmen descendants. The Cherokee Nation did not appeal the decision.

In the 2021 Cherokee Nation tribal council elections, Vann ran for an at-large tribal council seat, placing third among eight candidates. During her campaign, her eligibility was challenged on the grounds that she was not "Cherokee by blood," a requirement under the Cherokee Nation Constitution at the time. The Cherokee Nation Supreme Court, however, ruled that such language should be removed, affirming the full citizenship rights of Freedmen descendants based on the Treaty of 1866. This decision upheld the outcome of the 2017 federal case which ensured Freedmen descendants' right to run for office and other privileges of tribal citizenship.

In 2021, Vann was appointed by principal chief Chuck Hoskin Jr. to serve on the Cherokee Nation Environmental Protection Commission. The tribal council confirmed her appointment on September 13, 2021. The five-member commission is responsible for overseeing the tribe's environmental programs and recommending changes to environmental regulations. Vann’s appointment was seen as a historic first for a Freedmen descendant within the Cherokee Nation government. She has emphasized the importance of understanding the extent of tribal sovereignty in environmental matters, particularly in the context of the 2020 McGirt v. Oklahoma decision, which reaffirmed the legal standing of the Muscogee Nation and has implications for other tribes.

== See also ==
- Black Indians in the United States
- Cherokee Freedmen
- List of Native American politicians
- Native American women in politics
