= 2021 Cherokee Nation tribal council elections =

- June 5, 2021 (general); July 24, 2021 (runoff)

9 of the 17 seats in the Tribal Council

The 2021 Cherokee Nation tribal council elections took place on July 5, 2021, and July 24, 2021. The Cherokee Nation's Tribal Council is made up of seventeen tribal councilors elected from the fifteen districts within the reservation boundaries and two at-large seats.

In 2021, elections were held for districts 2, 4, 5, 7, 9, 10, 11, 15, and for one of the at-large seats.

The 2021 Cherokee Nation elections were the first Cherokee Nation elections to have their official results posted online, with results posted on election.cherokee.org. Prior to 2021, results would be posted on the window of the election commission building for public viewing. Social distancing and mask wearing were required at polling places as well due to an executive order issued by Principal Chief Chuck Hoskin Jr.

== Retiring candidates ==
Term limited

- Joe Byrd, District 2
- Harley Buzzard, District 10
- Janees Taylor, District 15

Retiring

- Canaan Duncan, District 7
- Mary Baker Shaw, at-large district

== Results ==
Nine of the seventeen seats on the Cherokee Nation Tribal Council had elections in 2021. In order to win a seat on the Tribal Council, a candidate must receive 50% plus one vote. If no candidate receives 50% plus one vote, then a runoff election is held between the two top vote earning candidates.

Incumbent tribal councilors Mike Dobbins, E. O. Smith, Mike Shambaugh, and Victoria Vazquez won their seats outright in the general election. Danny Callison, a retired teacher, defeated former tribal councilor Meredith Frailey in District 15.

Districts 2, 7, 10, and the at-large seat all proceeded to runoff elections.

The voter turnout for the June 5th general election was 8,940 out of 55,597, or 16.08%.

District 2
Candidate	First round		Second round	
Candidate	Votes	%	Votes	%
Candessa Tehee	219	32.21	367	50.48
Bobby Slover	200	29.41	360	49.52
Dusty Fore	112	16.47		
Jami Murphy	111	16.32		
Claude Stover	31	4.56		
Tonya Teaney	6	0.88		
Vicki Creel	1	0.15		
Total	680	100.00	727	100.00
Valid votes	680	100.00	727	99.73
Invalid/blank votes	0	0.00	2	0.27
Total votes	680	100.00	729	100.00

District 4
Candidate	Votes	%
Mike Dobbins	505	86.62
Sarah Cowett	78	13.38
Total	583	100.00
Valid votes	583	100.00
Invalid/blank votes	0	0.00
Total votes	583	100.00

District 5
Candidate	Votes	%
E. O. Smith	586	81.62
RL Bell	98	13.65
Richard W. Tyler	34	4.74
Total	718	100.00
Valid votes	718	100.00
Invalid/blank votes	0	0.00
Total votes	718	100.00

District 7
Candidate	First round		Second round	
Candidate	Votes	%	Votes	%
Joshua Sam	497	49.31	638	51.79
David Comingdeer	450	44.64	594	48.21
Gena Kirk	61	6.05		
Total	1,008	100.00	1,232	100.00
Valid votes	1,008	100.00	1,232	100.00
Invalid/blank votes	0	0.00	0	0.00
Total votes	1,008	100.00	1,232	100.00

District 9
Candidate	Votes	%
Mike Shambaugh	575	59.16
Lawrence Panther	249	25.62
Joyce Nix McCarter	148	15.23
Total	972	100.00
Valid votes	972	99.90
Invalid/blank votes	1	0.10
Total votes	973	100.00

District 10
Candidate	First round		Second round	
Candidate	Votes	%	Votes	%
Shaunda Handle-Davis	302	35.87	271	41.37
Melvina Shotpouch	294	34.92	384	58.63
John Ann Masters Thompson	214	25.42		
Darrel Hicks	13	1.54		
Cody Williams	13	1.54		
Dennis Ackley	6	0.71		
Total	842	100.00	655	100.00
Valid votes	842	100.00	655	100.00
Invalid/blank votes	0	0.00	0	0.00
Total votes	842	100.00	655	100.00

District 11
Candidate	Votes	%
Victoria Vazquez	486	62.95
Mike Purcell	236	30.57
Randy Junior White	49	6.35
Mason Hudson	1	0.13
Total	772	100.00
Valid votes	772	100.00
Invalid/blank votes	0	0.00
Total votes	772	100.00

District 15
Candidate	Votes	%
Danny Callison	484	59.83
Meredith Frailey	325	40.17
Total	809	100.00
Valid votes	809	100.00
Invalid/blank votes	0	0.00
Total votes	809	100.00

At-large district
Candidate	First round		Second round	
Candidate	Votes	%	Votes	%
Johnny Jack Kidwell	1,012	39.78	1,525	60.30
Kyle Haskins	688	27.04	1,004	39.70
Marilyn Vann	569	22.37		
Mary-Charlotte Grayson	150	5.90		
Matthew Benjamin Scrapper	75	2.95		
Robin Mayes	37	1.45		
Shawna Johnson	7	0.28		
Wallace Ryan Craig	6	0.24		
Total	2,544	100.00	2,529	100.00
Valid votes	2,544	99.57	2,529	99.92
Invalid/blank votes	11	0.43	2	0.08
Total votes	2,555	100.00	2,531	100.00

== District 2 election fraud ==
In May 2021, a campaign volunteer for Bobby Slover in District 2, Lisa Dawn Cookson, was arrested and charged with election fraud for filling out and signing absentee ballot request forms without the consent of voters. Over 90 ballots were effected. Cookson was charged with one count of election fraud and six counts of false personation. Each count of election fraud or false personation carries a penalty of up to three years per count or a maximum fine of $15,000. On July 15, Cookson pleaded not guilty to the charges.

On July 21, 2021, the Cherokee Nation Attorney General's office charged losing candidate Bobby Slover with "unlawfully and knowingly" accepting a $1,000 donation from the corporation Action Floors LLC. Cherokee Nation election law states that donations may only be made by "individual natural persons". On August 2, 2021, the Cherokee Nation Election Commission fined Slover $3,000 and disqualified him from the race.

== Legal challenges ==
On February 1, 2021, candidate Robin Mayes filed a legal challenge to disqualify Marilyn Vann from the election on the basis she did not meet the Cherokee "by blood" requirement to hold office in the Cherokee Constitution. Mayes argued that freedmen, the descendants of slaves owned by Cherokee citizens, were ineligible from holding office in the Cherokee Nation. On February 21, 2021, the Cherokee Nation Supreme Court ruled that the "by blood" language in Cherokee law is void and should be removed in line with Cherokee Nation v. Nash. Vann remained on the ballot.

On June 14, 2021, candidate Robin Mayes filed a legal challenge to the June 5th election and requested a new election. Mayes argued that the Cherokee Nation Supreme Court's striking of "by blood" requirements for office should "void" the election. The complaint was dismissed by the Cherokee Nation Supreme Court and described as a "frivolous action".

On August 3, 2021, the Cherokee Nation Supreme Court rejected petitions for recounts of the run-off elections in districts 2 and 7.

On August 8, 2021, the Cherokee Nation Supreme Court rejected a complaint alleging voter fraud in District 7 as "frivolous and dismissed with prejudice for failure to state a claim upon which relief can be granted."
