= Tralynna Scott =

Cherokee lawyer and economist

Cherokee Nation Treasurer
- In office August 2019 – August 2021
- Appointed by: Chuck Hoskin Jr.
- Succeeded by: Janees Taylor

Personal details
- Born: Tralynna Sherrill
- Citizenship: Cherokee Nation; United States
- Children: 2
- Education: University of Notre Dame; University of Tulsa

Tralynna Sherrill Scott is a Cherokee lawyer and economist serving concurrently as the chief economist of Cherokee Nation Businesses and the Cherokee Nation special envoy to the U.S. Department of the Treasury since 2021. She was previously the Cherokee Nation Treasurer from 2019 to 2021.

== Life ==
Tralynna Scott was born in the mid-1980s and grew up in Oklahoma. She is a citizen of the Cherokee Nation. Scott spent summers and school breaks with her grandparents in Greasy, Oklahoma, where they owned a community grocery store and cattle ranch. Scott earned a bachelor's degree in accountancy from the University of Notre Dame in 2006.

In 2006, Scott began her career with Cherokee Nation Businesses (CNB). Over the next 14 years, she worked her way through various roles, including investment analyst and financial analyst. Scott pursued further education while working, earning a joint Juris Doctor degree and master's degree in taxation from the University of Tulsa. In 2015, she received a master certificate in human resources from Cornell University. Scott served as the director of corporate tax for CNB. In this position, she focused on corporate and tribal taxation, employment law, tribal gaming protections, and compliance issues for multiple business units across 48 states.

In August 2019, Scott was appointed as treasurer of the Cherokee Nation by principal chief Chuck Hoskin Jr. and was unanimously confirmed by the tribal council. As treasurer, she managed the Cherokee Nation's $1.5 billion government budget and oversaw more than 100 employees. During her time as treasurer, Scott played a significant role in guiding the Cherokee Nation through the economic challenges brought by the COVID-19 pandemic. She led the development of the tribe's CARES Act spending plan, known as the Respond, Recover, and Rebuild (RRR) Plan. This plan allocated funds for various sectors, including individual assistance, infrastructure, education, housing, and health care. She managed the allocation of the American Rescue Plan Act of 2021 (ARPA) funds and helped secure direct payments for Cherokee citizens. Scott contributed to the Cherokee Nation's response to McGirt v. Oklahoma, which expanded tribal jurisdiction. As a member of the Cherokee Nation Sovereignty Commission, she helped secure funding for the tribe's criminal justice system.

In August 2021, Scott stepped down as treasurer of Cherokee Nation to become the chief economist for CNB. In this role, she analyzes economic conditions and supports the long-term growth of CNB, which generates over $1.1 billion in revenue annually and operates in various sectors globally. In August 2021, Scott was also appointed by Hoskin Jr. as the Cherokee Nation special envoy to the U.S. Department of the Treasury. She serves on its Treasury Tribal Advisory Committee. On August 31, 2023, she was reappointed to another one-year term as special envoy. In March 2024, Scott was appointed to the leadership council of the Center for Indian Country Development at the Federal Reserve Bank of Minneapolis.

Scott is married to Brandon Scott. They have twin daughters born in 2012.

== See also ==
- List of Native American politicians
- Native American women in politics
