= David Walkingstick =

Cherokee Nation politician

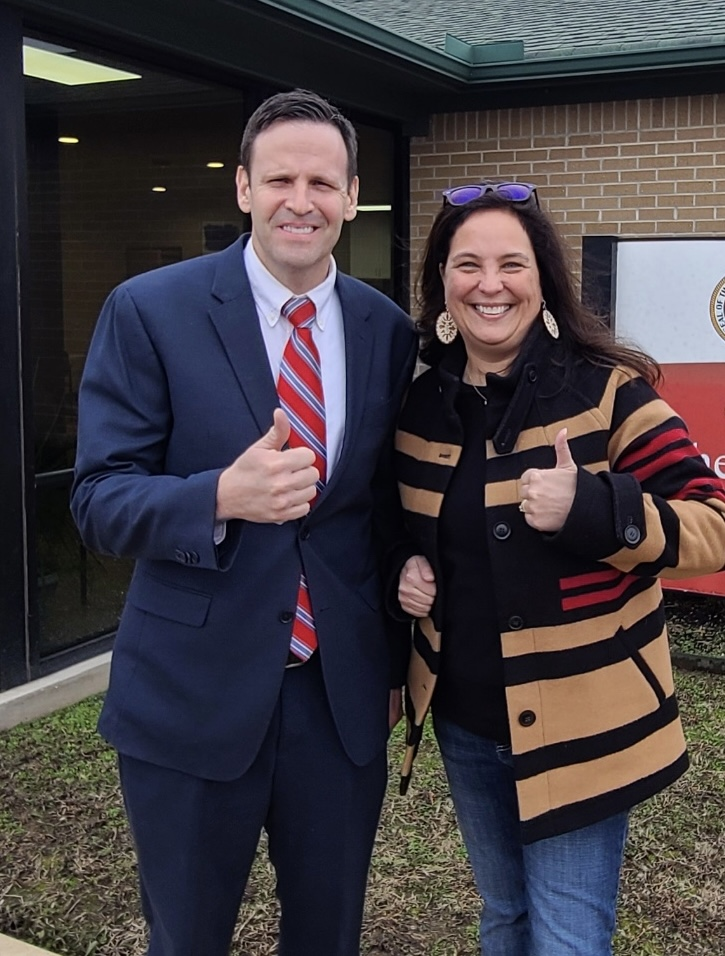
- Walkingstick alongside Cara Cowan Watts in 2023

Cherokee Nation Tribal Councilor for the 3rd district
- In office August 14, 2013 – August 14, 2019
- Preceded by: Position established
- Succeeded by: Wes Nofire

Cherokee Nation Tribal Councilor for the 1st district, seat 2
- In office August 14, 2011 – August 14, 2013
- Preceded by: Position established
- Succeeded by: Position disestablished

Personal details
- Citizenship: Cherokee Nation; United States
- Party: Republican
- Education: University of Central Oklahoma (B.S.); East Central University (M.S.)

David Walkingstick is a Cherokee Nation politician who served on the Cherokee Nation tribal council between 2011 and 2019.

== Education and career ==
David Walkingstick graduated from Sequoyah High School in 1999, and went on to earn his bachelor's degree from the University of Central Oklahoma and a master's degree in school administration from East Central University. He was the Muskogee Public Schools' Indian Education Program director from 2010 to 2018. He resigned after a petition was presented to the school board asking for him to be fired for his stance in the Cherokee freedmen controversy. He was appointed by Governor Mary Fallin to the Oklahoma Advisory Council on Indian Education in 2014.

== Cherokee Nation tribal council ==
Walkingstick first ran for the Cherokee Nation tribal council district 1, seat 2 in 2007; he placed fourth in the general election. In 2011, he ran for the new District 1, Seat 3 in an eight candidate general election. He led the general election with 36% of the vote and advanced to a runoff with Mark Vance; Walkingstick won the runoff with 1,886 votes to Vance's 827. He was sworn on August 14, 2011. In 2013, he was redistricted to represent district 3. He ran for re-election in 2015 and won the general election with 54% of the vote. He was sworn on August 14, 2015. In 2017, he proposed legislation to bring the recognition of same-sex marriage to a referendum after the Cherokee Nation attorney general Todd Hembree wrote an opinion, with the force of law, finding Cherokee Nation law that defined marriage as between only a man and woman was unconstitutional. That same year, Walkingstick proposed appealing the 2017 federal court case Cherokee Nation v. Nash which resulted in the recognition of Cherokee Freedmen's citizenship; he also supported the since voided 2007 amendment to the Cherokee constitution that limited citizenship to "Cherokee by blood."

== Campaigns for principal chief and deputy chief ==
Walkingstick filed to run in the 2019 Cherokee Nation principal chief election. During the campaign, Walkingstick called for the Bureau of Indian Affairs to oversee the elections after the Cherokee Nation Election Commission disqualified candidate Wanda Hatfield for violating Cherokee Nation election law. In April, an election law violation complaint was filled against his campaign and in May the Cherokee Nation election commission ordered Cherokees for Change LLC to stop contributing to his and Meredith Frailey's campaigns. Later that month, the Election Commission disqualified him from the election for coordinating with the LLC; Walkingstick denied any connection despite an affidavit from the LLC's owner Walkingstick knew of their activities. The Cherokee Nation Supreme Court upheld his disqualification. Since Walkingstick was disqualified after ballots were printed, signs were put up at polling places informing voters of his disqualification. Chuck Hoskin Jr. went on to win the election.

Walkingstick ran in the 2023 Cherokee Nation deputy chief election and lost to incumbent deputy chief Bryan Warner.

== Electoral history ==
2023 Cherokee Nation Principal Chief Election
Candidate	Votes	%
Bryan Warner	10,300	61.54%
David Walkingstick	4,901	29.28%
Meredith Frailey	1,147	6.85%
Bill Pearson	389	2.32%
Total votes	16,737	100%
