= Cara Cowan Watts =

Cherokee politician (born 1974)

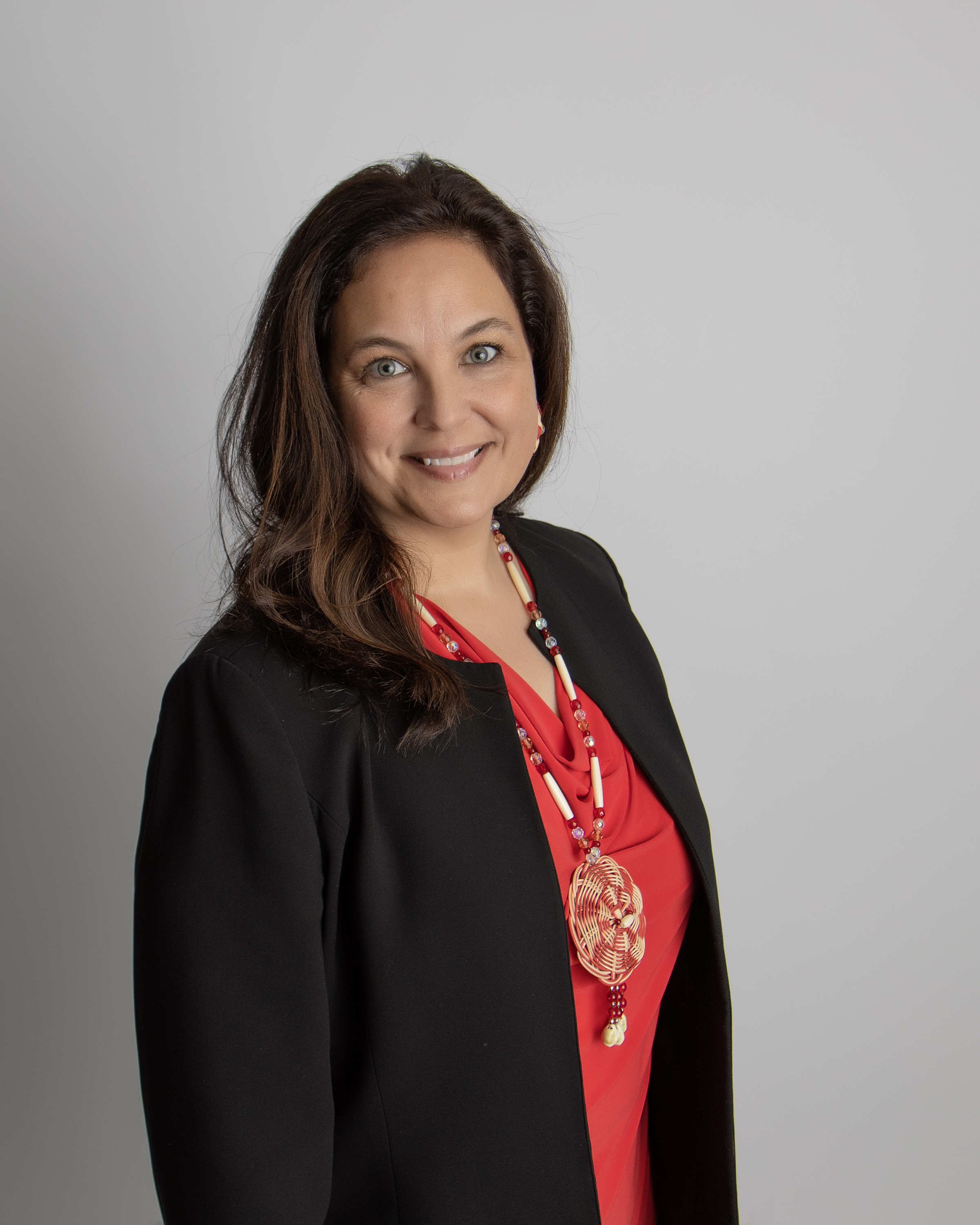

Member of the Cherokee Nation Tribal Council
- In office August 14, 2003 – August 14, 2015
- Preceded by: Harold DeMoss
- Succeeded by: Buel Anglen
- Constituency: 7th District (2003–2011); 5th District Seat 2 (2011–2013); 13th District (2013–2015)

Personal details
- Born: April 23, 1974 (age 52) Shawnee, Oklahoma, U.S.
- Citizenship: American; Cherokee Nation
- Party: Republican
- Relatives: John Rogers (ancestor)
- Education: Oklahoma State University, Stillwater (BS, MS, PhD)

Cara Cowan Watts (born April 23, 1974) is a Cherokee Nation politician. She served on the Cherokee Nation Tribal Council from 2003 to 2015 and was a candidate for Principal Chief of the Cherokee Nation in the 2023 Cherokee Nation principal chief election.

== Early life and family ==
Cara Cowan Watts was born on April 23, 1974, in Shawnee, Oklahoma, to Beverly (Leerskov) and Clarence "Curly" Cowan. She has a brother named Brett. She is a descendant of Cherokee "Old Settler" (Note: "Old Settlers", in the context of Cherokee peoples, refers to Cherokee people who voluntarily relocated to Arkansas before the Trail of Tears.) Chief, John Rogers.

Cowan Watts graduated from Seminole High School in Seminole, Oklahoma. She then attended Oklahoma State University, where she earned a Bachelor of Science degree in Mechanical Engineering in 1997, a Master of Science degree in engineering with a focus on Telecommunications in 2002, and a Ph.D. in Biosystems Engineering in 2015.

== Early career ==
In 2003, Cowan Watts worked for WilTel Communications in Tulsa, Oklahoma.

== Cherokee Nation political career ==
In 2003, Cara Cowan won her first Tribal Councilor election in District 7 with 66% of the vote, the highest winning percentage of any Tribal Councilor in that election. At the time she was the youngest Cherokee Nation tribal councilor in history at 29. She defeated incumbent Harold DeMoss. She served as deputy speaker of the tribal council from 2007 to 2011 and as acting speaker in 2011. In 2011, She was appointed to the technical advisory group for the Oklahoma Water Resources Board to assist in a review of water quality in Oklahoma's scenic rivers. She was re-elected in 2011 to District 5, Seat 2 after redistricting and sworn in on August 14, 2011. After another round of redistricting, she represented the 13th district starting August 14, 2013. Cowan Watts served as a Tribal Councilor for the Cherokee Nation from 2003 to 2015 when she was term limited. She was succeeded by Buel Anglen.

In 2019, Cowan Watts ran against incumbent Cherokee Nation tribal councilor Keith Austin in the 14th district; she lost the election.

=== Anglen vs Cowan Watts lawsuit ===
On March 19, 2013, Tribal Councilor Buel Anglen filed a lawsuit in Cherokee Nation District Court against Tribal Councilor Cara Cowan Watts and the tribe's Election Commission. Anglen's petition challenged the constitutionality of new election laws under the Cherokee Nation constitution. Anglen opposed Legislative Act 26-12, which would change the voting districts within the Cherokee Nation boundaries from 5 to 15 and redistrict the tribal council. The redistricting placed Cowan Watts in District 13, a district she did not live in. On January 23, 2013, Judge Bart Fite of the Cherokee Nation district court upheld the legality of the new district maps, which would create 15 districts plus two at-large districts. The ruling was appealed to the Cherokee Nation Supreme Court and on February 28, 2013, the Court announced its decision to uphold the lower court's ruling.

=== Principal Chief campaigns ===
Cowan Watts campaigned for Principal Chief of the Cherokee Nation in February 2015, but withdrew from the race in March.

In 2023, Cowan Watts announced she would run in the 2023 Cherokee Nation principal chief election. Her running mate was David Walkingstick. (Note: Cherokee Nation election ballots formally list principal chief and deputy chief separately, but candidates frequently (but not uniformly) campaign with a running mate.) She lost the election to incumbent principal chief Chuck Hoskin Jr.

== Political positions ==
=== Citizenship and Cherokee Freedmen ===
In 2007, Cherokee citizens passed a constitutional amendment that limited Cherokee Nation citizenship to those who have "Indian blood." Cowan Watts supported the amendment as a right under self-governance. Limiting Cherokee Nation citizenship by blood was criticized by Cherokee Freedmen groups who argued the measure stripped 2,800 African American descendants of Freedmen's citizenship; Watts argued the amendment "is absolutely something that we have to defend. And the Cherokee people overwhelmingly voted in the Constitution that we want to remain an Indian tribe made up of Indians" and pointed out there were still 1,500 Black Cherokee Nation citizens after the amendment. The constitutional amendment was overturned and all references to "by blood" were removed from Cherokee Nation law by a Cherokee Nation Supreme Court ruling in 2021.

Cowan Watts is a supporter of cooperation between the Cherokee Nation and the Eastern Band of Cherokee to combat fraudulent Cherokee heritage groups.

=== STEM advocacy ===
Cowan Watts received the Ely S. Parker Award, the highest honor from the American Indian Science and Engineering Society (AISES), for her contributions and achievements in STEM fields. In 2001, she and her brother established a scholarship fund for Native American engineering students in their parents' honor. Cowan Watts was involved with the university chapter of AISES and the Native American Student Association during her time at OSU.

== Electoral history ==
2023 Cherokee Nation Principal Chief Election
Candidate	Votes	%
Chuck Hoskin Jr. (incumbent)	10,556	62.9%
Cara Cowan Watts	4,008	23.88%
Wes Nofire	1,673	9.97%
David Cornsilk	546	3.25%
Total votes	16,783	100%

== See also ==
- List of Native American politicians
- Native American women in politics
