= Anna Mitchell =

Cherokee potter from Oklahoma (1926–2012)

- Anna Mitchell in 2006
- Born: Anna Belle Sixkiller; October 16, 1926; Sycamore, Delaware County, Oklahoma
- Died: March 3, 2012 (aged 85); Vinita, Oklahoma
- Other names: Anna Belle Mitchell, Anna Belle Sixkiller Mitchell, Anna Sixkiller Mitchell
- Citizenship: Cherokee Nation and U.S.
- Occupation: potter
- Years active: 1967–2012
- Known for: Cherokee National Treasure

Anna Mitchell (October 16, 1926 – March 3, 2012) was a Cherokee Nation potter who revived the historic art of Southeastern Woodlands pottery for Cherokee people in Oklahoma. Her tribe designated her as a Cherokee National Treasure and has works in numerous museum collections including the Smithsonian National Museum of the American Indian, the Museum of Fine Arts, Boston, and the Fred Jones Jr. Museum of Art, among others.

== Early life ==
Anna Belle Sixkiller was born on October 16, 1926, near Sycamore, a small town near Jay, Oklahoma, to Oo loo tsa (ᎤᎷᏣ, Iva Louise née Owens) and Houston Sixkiller. Her family were full-blood Cherokee, who spoke the Cherokee language in their home. Her mother worked as a domestic or waitress in Jay and at night often quilted. Her father worked on their farm, raising produce to feed his family. Sixkiller began her education in the public school system in Jay. She was unable to speak English, and her teacher was indifferent. Financial struggles caused by divorce and the Great Depression led her mother to take her and her siblings out of the school. Anna and a younger sister were sent to the Seneca Indian School, one of the federally funded American Indian boarding schools, located in Wyandotte. There Anna quickly learned English but suffered from homesickness. Since the Seneca School only went to the ninth grade, after graduation, Sixkiller completed her education at the Haskell Institute, her mother's alma mater and an intertribal boarding school in Lawrence, Kansas.

On April 17, 1946, in Oswego, Kansas, Sixkiller married Robert Clay Mitchell, a Cherokee and descendant of Sequoyah, the man that invented the Cherokee syllabary. The couple settled in Vinita, Oklahoma, and had five children: Nena, Clay, Victoria, Betty, and Julie. Busy with raising her children, most of her time was spent on domestic work and school activities over the next years. In 1967, her husband asked Mitchell to create a clay pipe for him similar to the one often depicted in portraits of Sequoyah. Using clay found in their pond, she fashioned the pipe, which though she did not intend to become a potter, piqued her curiosity about how traditional Cherokee pottery was made.

== Career ==
For the next several years, Mitchell embarked on a course of self study. She knew nothing about the properties of clay and had no idea what Cherokee pottery was supposed to look like. She began by visiting museums in Oklahoma and Arkansas and then made trips to the Eastern Cherokee lands in North Carolina. She also made research trips to learn about pottery traditions of the Southwest Pueblo peoples and the Northeastern Woodlands people, all the while experimenting with making different pots, though she was often not satisfied with her result. In 1973, Mitchell held her first public exhibition at the Tulsa Indian Trade Fair and met Clydia Nahwooksy (Cherokee. 1933–2009), a director of programming at the Smithsonian Folklife Festival. Nahwooksy encouraged Mitchell's work and helped her access material in the Smithsonian archives.

Mitchell learned that the adopted of trade items during the fur trade era and the forced removal of the Trail of Tears of the Southeastern Woodlands people had led to a decline in their historic arts. Finding the book Sun Circles and Human Hands at the University of Arkansas of Fayetteville, she also learned the techniques used by precontact Mississippian artists to produce Eastern Woodlands pottery. Though similar pottery shapes and coiling techniques were used by Western and Wastern Indigenous people, Mitchell learned that the designs were different. In the Southwest, motifs were typically angular with geometric shapes and stylized depictions from the natural world of animals and landmarks, placed on the pot in specific locations. Designs of the Southeast tended to employ arches and swirls with realistic images of birds and human forms, with a free-flowing placement pattern on the vessel. Many of Mitchell's early works were influenced by precontact Quapaw pottery of Arkansas.

Aiming to remain true to the techniques and designs of Southeastern pottery making and determined to preserve ancestral methods, Mitchell began with low-firing clay. She later mixed it with high-firing porcelain clay to obtain a stronger, but lighter, result. Grinding, pounding and sifting the clay to remove large particles, Mitchell worked to soften the clay and then tempered it with ground shells and sandstone before adding water. To shape the pot, she had to replicate stamping tools and wooden paddles based upon designs she had seen on pottery fragments in museums. After the vessel was formed and to maintain the historic color palette of gray, red, and yellow, she then brushed on slip, made from the clay on her land, and fired it over an open pit fire. Placing the pots on a metal sheet above a brick enclosure, where a wood fire was kept burning for an entire day, Mitchell allowed them to harden and gradually cool as the fire burned out. Once cooled, pieces were burnished with small stones to create a smooth texture.

Among her many awards and honors were the first prize in Muskogee′s Five Civilized Tribes Museum annual juried competitive art show in 1973; first place in the Oklahoma Arts and Crafts Show of Tulsa in 1977; a solo exhibition at the Southern Plains Indian Museum in 1978; and winning the first and second place prizes in the 1979 Five Civilized Tribes Museum annual competitive art show. In 1981, she participated in a group exhibition Oklahoma Cherokee Art hosted by the American Indian Community House gallery in New York City and won an award at the Five Civilized Tribes Museum annual art show. In 1982, Mitchell exhibited at the Frontier Folklife Festival in St. Louis, Missouri, and at The Night of the First Americans, held in Washington, DC, at the Kennedy Center. That year, she took first, second, and third prize in the Smithsonian Institution's Festival of American Folk Life and was designated as a National Treasure of the Cherokee Nation.

In 1983, Mitchell was invited to participate in an exhibition at the National Museum of the American Indian George Gustav Heye Center in Manhattan. Winning a first place at the Santa Fe Indian Market in 1985, she had two solo exhibitions that year — one at the Creek Council House Museum in Okmulgee and the other at the Cherokee National Museum, in Park Hill. In 1987, she held one-woman exhibitions at the Qualla Arts and Crafts Mutual in Cherokee, North Carolina and at the Tekakwitha Indian Crafts Center of Helen, Georgia. In 1990, Mitchell was featured at a solo exhibition at the University of Arkansas and the following year won first, third, and honorable mention at the Intertribal Indian Market of Dayton, Ohio. She continued to show her work in local art shows like the annual Cherokee Art Market until her death.

Mitchell's goal was to revive the art of Cherokee pottery-making for Cherokee people in Oklahoma. In 1987, Jane Osti (Cherokee Nation), a student studying at Northeastern Oklahoma State University in Tahlequah, conducted an interview with Mitchell for a heritage course. She became fascinated with the craft of pottery-making and began studying with Mitchell. Osti was later commissioned by the Cherokee Nation to create a bust of Mitchell, which was unveiled in 1990 and housed at the Bacone House on the campus of Northeastern State University. Other students who studied with Mitchell and have professional art careers her daughter, Victoria Vazquez (Cherokee Nation) and Crystal Hanna (Cherokee Nation). Mitchell also inspired Martha Berry (Cherokee Nation), encouraging her to revive the art of Cherokee beadwork. In 2008, Mitchell was honored with the Educator of Arts and Humanities Lifetime Achievement Award by the Cherokee Nation.

== Family ==
Many of Anna Sixkiller Mitchell's family are important leaders in the Cherokee Nation. Her brother Dennis Sixkiller is a leading language instructor, who has a Cherokee-language online radio show. Besides being a ceramic artist, Victoria Vazquez, Mitchell's daughter, serves as a tribal councilperson.

== Death and legacy ==
Mitchell died on March 3, 2012, in Vinita and was buried in Fairview Cemetery. A memorial scholarship fund was created by the Cherokee Nation in her honor. Her artworks are in the permanent collections of the Smithsonian National Museum of the American Indian, the Eastern Trails Museum in Vinita, the Fred Jones Jr. Museum of Art, and the Museum of Fine Arts, Boston, as well as other venues abroad and in private collections. In 2015, in honor of the 25th anniversary of the completion of Mitchell's bronze bust, it was removed from the Northeastern campus and placed on display at the W. W. Keeler Tribal Government Complex in Tahlequah, Oklahoma. In 2016, the Cherokee Heritage Center hosted a six-month exhibition, Anna Mitchell Legacy that featured pieces in various museum collections to show her development as an artist throughout her career and showcased work by her artistic protogées including her daughter Victoria Vazquez, Jane Osti, and Crystal Hanna. The exhibition also included some of the tools she used to work on pottery. The following year, a mural by Dan Mink depicting Mitchell and her work was erected in Vinita along West Canadian Avenue and South Wilson Street.

The Cherokee Art Market offers an Anna Mitchell award each year to honor the artist's memory.

The Cherokee Nation opened the Anna Mitchell Cultural and Welcome Center in Vinita, Oklahoma, the fall of 2022.
