= Andrea Smith (academic) =

American academic, women's rights and anti-violence activist

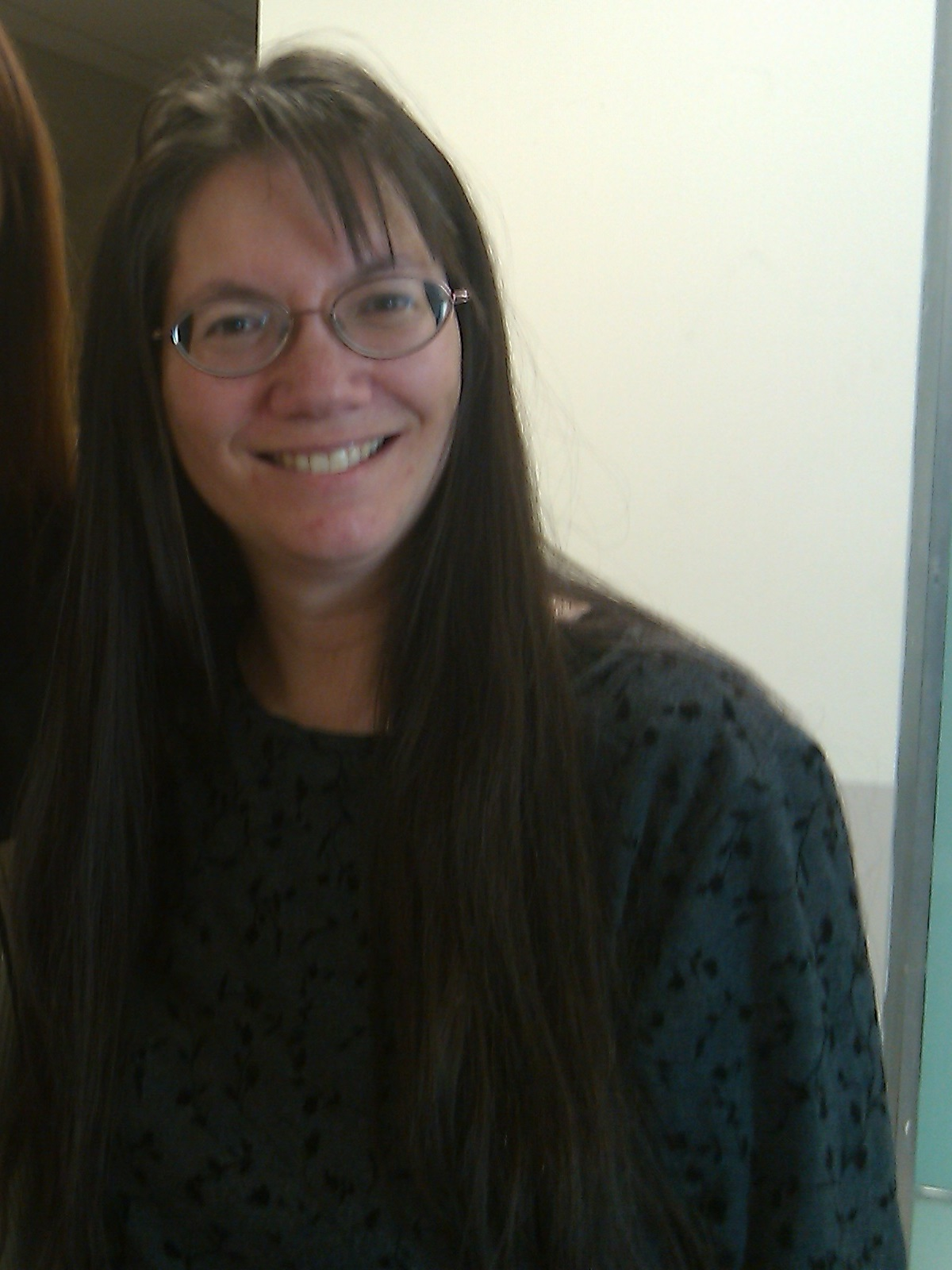
- Andrea Smith in 2011
- Born: San Francisco, California, U.S.
- Occupations: Academic; activist

Academic background
- Education: Harvard University (BA); Union Theological Seminary (MDiv); University of California, Santa Cruz (PhD); University of California Irvine School of Law

Academic work
- Institutions: University of Michigan; University of California, Riverside
- Main interests: Feminist studies; Native American studies

Andrea Lee Smith is an American academic, feminist, and activist. Smith's work has primarily focused on issues of violence against women of color and their communities, specifically Native American women. Formerly an assistant professor of American Culture and Women's Studies at the University of Michigan in Ann Arbor, Michigan, she is also a co-founder of INCITE! Women of Color Against Violence, the Boarding School Healing Project, and the Chicago chapter of Women of All Red Nations.

Smith worked as a professor in the Department of Ethnic Studies at University of California, Riverside. In August 2023, the university announced that she would resign from the university in August 2024 to become an emerita professor, due to charges that she "made fraudulent claims to Native American identity in violation of the Faculty Code of Conduct provisions concerning academic integrity."

Since at least 1991, Smith has claimed to be Cherokee. However, she has never been enrolled in a recognized Cherokee tribe, and genealogist David Cornsilk, who has said Smith hired him twice to research her claims of heritage, found no evidence of Cherokee ancestry for Smith. The controversy over Smith's claim to be Cherokee received relatively little attention outside academic circles until 2015, when her claim was more widely publicized in more mainstream media outlets. A number of Native American scholars, including a group of Cherokee women in academia, have rejected Smith's self-identification as Cherokee, and The Daily Beast has dubbed Smith "the Native American Rachel Dolezal".

== Early life and education ==
Smith was born to Helen Jean Wilkinson and Donald R. Smith in San Francisco, and grew up in Southern California. She has one sister, Justine Wilson (Smith), who is the pastor at Norman First American United Methodist Church. Although her family is descended primarily from British and Scandinavian immigrants to the US, she and her sister grew up hearing stories about the possibility of a distant Native American ancestor, like many white Americans.

Smith earned her bachelor's degree at Harvard University in Comparative Study of Religion, and her Masters of Divinity at the Union Theological Seminary in 1997. In 2002, she received her Ph.D. in History of Consciousness from UC Santa Cruz; her dissertation was on the Bible, gender, and nationalism in both the American Indian communities and among activists of the Christian Right.

== Activism and professional work ==
Smith has long been active in anti-violence activism, serving as a rape crisis counselor and starting the Chicago chapter of Women of All Red Nations. Along with Nadine Naber, Smith co-founded INCITE! Women of Color Against Violence in 2000, and she plays a prominent role in its National Planning Committee. INCITE! is a national grassroots organization that engages in direct action and critical dialogue to end violence against women of color and their communities.

Smith was also a founding member of the Boarding School Healing Project (BSHP). According to its website, the BSHP "seeks to document Native boarding school abuses so that Native communities can begin healing ... and demand justice." Smith has worked with Amnesty International as a Bunche Fellow, coordinating the research project on sexual violence and American Indian women. She represented the Indigenous Women's Network and the American Indian Law Alliance at the United Nations World Conference Against Racism in 1991. In 2005, Smith, in recognition of her research and work regarding violence against women of color in the US, was among 1000 women nominated as a group for the Nobel Peace Prize by Ruth-Gaby Vermot-Mangold, a Swiss parliament member. As of March 2013, Smith serves as the U.S. Coordinator for the Ecumenical Association of Third World Theologians.

Smith and her sister Justine were faculty members at the North American Institute for Indigenous Theological Studies.

== Critical work ==
Smith's work makes a critical intervention in Native American Studies which she argues has a tendency to dismiss patriarchy as outside the purview of analysis of Native scholarship. Most Native scholars dismiss patriarchy because they identify it as a uniquely Western manifestation forced onto Native populations through assimilation. Smith argues that despite the fact that patriarchy is not intrinsic to Native society, its fundamental importance in the domination and extermination of Native peoples and Native women in particular should not be discounted.

== Awards ==
- Gustavus Myers Outstanding Book Award (2005) for Conquest: Sexual Violence and American Indian Genocide
- California State University (Northridge) Phenomenal Woman Award (2010)

== Controversies ==
=== Tenure denial ===
On February 22, 2008, Smith was denied tenure from the College of Literature, Science and the Arts at the University of Michigan. This decision attracted "an unusual degree of attention from scholars, both at Ann Arbor and nationally." Some 30 faculty and students concluded "the University's tenure evaluation process discriminates against women of color and interdisciplinary professors."

Smith's misrepresentations about her identity also played a role in the tenure dispute. Cherokee genealogist David Cornsilk stated that Smith "told [him] her employment depended on finding proof of Indian heritage." When she was denied tenure by the University of Michigan, she suggested discrimination on the basis of her "Native American descent".

=== Cherokee ancestry claim ===
Since at least 1991, Smith has publicly claimed to be Cherokee although she has never been enrolled in any federally recognized Cherokee tribe, and no Cherokee ancestry has ever been found for her.

At a conference in 2007, Smith was said to admit her uncertainty regarding possible Cherokee descent to Cherokee citizens and scholars Patti Jo King and Richard Allen, apologizing and agreeing to set the record straight. Native lawyer Steve Russell (Cherokee Nation) publicly accused Smith of ethnic fraud in a 2008 editorial published by Indian Country Today, but it was not widely read. Smith failed to set the record straight, and her lack of documented Cherokee descent became "something of an open secret" until 2015. She continued to be identified at professional events as Cherokee or Native American, and claimed it was part of the reason for her denial of tenure at the University of Michigan (see above). Following the media attention surrounding activist Rachel Dolezal in 2015, who falsely claimed African-American identity, an anonymous Tumblr blog entitled Andrea Smith is not Cherokee, was published, listing a chronology of book and conference biographies of Smith that refer to her purported Cherokee ancestry.

The Daily Beast picked up Smith's story, and it attracted national attention. The Daily Beast dubbed Smith "the Native American Rachel Dolezal".

Cherokee Nation-United Keetoowah Band genealogist David Cornsilk has claimed that Smith hired him twice in the 1990s to research her genealogy and that he found no proof of Cherokee ancestry. In an open letter published in Indian Country Today in July 2015, Cornsilk stated that the Cherokee are a very well-documented people, and he asserts that Cherokee citizenship is based on recognition by the Cherokee people and participation in the community, not by an individual such as Smith asserting a belief in a self-derived, independent identity. Cornsilk has written that "fact speaks loud and clear that not only is Andrea Smith not enrolled, SHE IS NOT A CHEROKEE".

In the ensuing controversy, some supporters of Smith started a group blog entitled Against a Politics of Disposability. Incite!, the collective that Smith helped to found, told The Daily Beast, "We support Andy Smith and the self-determination of all First Nations People. Incite would rather place our collective resources into abolishing settler colonialism than in perpetuating this ideology by policing her racial and tribal identity." Andrew Jolivette spoke in her defense, saying it was up to the families of Natives to decide their identities.

However, Native American scholars and activists have largely spoken in opposition to Smith. An open letter, signed by twelve Native American women scholars, reads in part, "Asking for accountability to our communities and collectivities is not limited to Andrea Smith. Asking for transparency, self-reflexivity, and honesty about our complex histories and scholarly investments is motivated by the desire to strengthen ethical Indigenous scholarship by both Indigenous and non-Indigenous scholars." They also noted the names of numerous Indigenous scholars who have made contributions in the same field as Smith, saying that they had sometimes been overlooked. They continued, "Andrea Smith has a decades-long history of self-contradictory stories of identity and affiliation testified to by numerous scholars and activists, including her admission to four separate parties that she has no claim to Cherokee ancestry at all." The scholars have claimed that Smith's actions damaged trust between Indigenous and non-Indigenous scholars and were used to advance her own professional career.

Five Cherokee women scholars, including Patti Jo King, published an open letter, saying that Smith's false claims damaged tribal integrity and kinship, and that she had tried to build her career on a false base. King said, "since Andrea Smith has never been affiliated with any of our communities, she is a cultural outsider." King added that "it is Smith’s deception—not her enrollment status and not her advocacy—that constitutes the central issue.'

Native American studies ethnographer David Shorter wrote, "Andrea Smith surely thinks she is Cherokee; or she did at some point. She has been asked repeatedly to either stop claiming Cherokee identity or to either authenticate her claims through a reliable kinship, through ties to a specific family, or through the Cherokee Nation’s official process for enrollment."

Smith's sister, Justine, has also claimed Cherokee ancestry and is likewise accused of ethnic fraud. She allegedly falsified a tribal card of the Cherokee Nation. Justine, who has the same parents as Andrea, also claims Ojibwe heritage. She was announced as Native American when hired by the Saint Paul School of Theology in Oklahoma, but left after three months after being confronted about her identity when the Cherokee Nation disputed her claim. Justine Smith is a pastor at the First American United Methodist Church in Norman, Oklahoma.

Andrea Smith responded to the protests and accusations in July 2015 with a statement on her blog asserting that her "enrollment status does not impact [her] Cherokee identity," and that she always has been and always will be Cherokee.

In May 2021, a New York Times Magazine article detailed how Smith has continued to be published as an academic despite overwhelming evidence that she is not Cherokee.

In August 2023, Smith's employer, the University of California, Riverside, announced in a press release that Smith would resign from the university with effect in August 2024. Thirteen faculty members at Riverside alleged that Smith had "made fraudulent claims to Native American identity in violation of the Faculty Code of Conduct provisions concerning academic integrity." While Smith denied the charges, the "separation agreement and release of all claims," with the resignation/retirement date, was mutually agreed to by Smith and the University.

== Selected publications ==
Smith is the author of the following books:

- Sacred Sites, Sacred Rites (1998) ISBN B0006R030E
- Conquest: Sexual Violence and American Indian Genocide (2005) ISBN 978-0-89608-743-9
- Native Americans and the Christian Right: The Gendered Politics of Unlikely Alliances (2008) ISBN 978-0-8223-4163-5
- Unreconciled: From Racial Reconciliation to Racial Justice in Christian Evangelicalism, Duke University Press (2019) ISBN 978-1-4780-0640-4

Smith edited and/or co-edited the following anthologies:

- The Color of Violence: The INCITE! Anthology (2006) ISBN 978-0-89608-762-0
- The Revolution Will Not Be Funded: Beyond the Non-Profit Industrial Complex (2007) ISBN 978-0-89608-766-8
- Theorizing Native Studies, Duke University Press (2014) ISBN 978-0-8223-5679-0
- Native Studies Keywords, University of Arizona Press (2015) ISBN 978-0-8165-3150-9
- Evangelical Theologies of Liberation and Justice, InterVarsity Press (2019) ISBN 978-0-8308-5246-8
- Otherwise Worlds, Duke University Press (2020) ISBN 978-1-4780-0838-5

== See also ==
- Pretendian
- Qwo-Li Driskill
