= Fulbright (disambiguation) =

Fulbright is an American educational grant program.

It may also refer to:

- J. William Fulbright, the senator
- William Wilson Fulbright, the Missouri pioneer
