= Janees Taylor =

Cherokee accountant and politician

Cherokee Nation Treasurer
- Incumbent
- Assumed office October 1, 2021
- Appointed by: Chuck Hoskin Jr.
- Preceded by: Tralynna Scott

Cherokee Nation Tribal Councilor for the 15th district
- In office 2013–2019
- Succeeded by: Danny Callison

Personal details
- Children: 2
- Education: Northeastern State University

Janees Taylor is a Cherokee accountant and politician serving as the treasurer of Cherokee Nation since 2021. She was a member of the Cherokee Nation Tribal Council representing District 15 from 2013 to 2019.

== Life ==
Taylor was born and raised in Oklahoma and is a citizen of Cherokee Nation. She graduated from Northeastern State University with a degree in accounting. After graduation, Taylor passed the CPA exam and worked in banking. In 2021, Taylor reported to the Cherokee Phoenix that she was finishing a M.B.A. with an emphasis in accounting and finance.

In 2013, Taylor was elected to the Cherokee Nation Tribal Council for district 15, defeating Meredith Frailey in a three-way race by 27 votes. Principal Chief Chad Smith filed a lawsuit on Frailey's behalf requesting a runoff between her and Taylor, but the Cherokee Nation Supreme Court ruled against the lawsuit. District 15 included southern portions of Rogers and Mayes counties. Taylor served as the chairperson of the executive and finance committee and was a member of the rules committee. Her work on the council focused on healthcare, education, and economic development. She was the secretary of the tribal council from 2018 to 2021 and a representative on the Inter-Tribal Council of the Five Civilized Tribes. After completing her second term in 2019, Taylor was term-limited and could not seek re-election. She was succeeded by Danny Callison.

In 2020, Taylor was appointed to principal chief Chuck Hoskin Jr.'s special commission for the protection of Cherokee Nation sovereignty, established to prepare for changes resulting from the U.S. Supreme Court ruling in McGirt v. Oklahoma. She is an advisory member on the Cherokee Nation Housing Authority board of commissioners, member of the Claremore Indian Hospital board of directors. In 2021, Taylor was nominated by Hoskin Jr. to serve as the Treasurer of the Cherokee Nation, succeeding Tralynna Scott. She was unanimously confirmed by the tribal council and began her role on October 1, 2021, overseeing the Cherokee Nation's $3.4 billion budget and managing approximately 100 employees in finance and related departments.

Taylor has resided in Claremore and Pryor, Oklahoma with her husband Brent. They have two daughters.

== See also ==
- List of Native American politicians
- Native American women in politics
