= Jane Osti =

Cherokee Nation artist from Oklahoma, U.S. (born 1945)

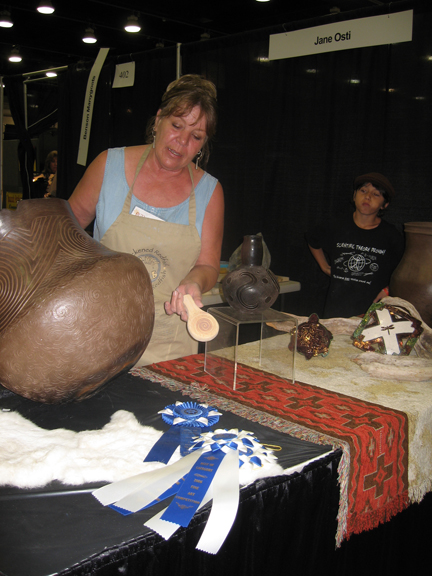
- Osti demonstrating handling a paddle for stamping pottery, 2006
- Born: 1945 (age 80–81); Tahlequah, Oklahoma, United States
- Citizenship: Cherokee Nation and American
- Education: Northeastern State University (B.A. in Art, Master of Science in Higher Education)
- Occupation: Arist
- Known for: Cherokee pottery
- Style: Southeastern Woodland/Mound builders inspired pottery, Raku pottery
- Elected: Cherokee Living Treasure, Oklahoma Arts Council

Jane Osti (born 1945, Tahlequah, Oklahoma) is a native Cherokee artist. She specializes in traditional Cherokee pottery with unique embellishments and designs. In 2005, Osti was one of the youngest Cherokee artists to be appointed as a Living Treasure by Cherokee Nation. Currently, Osti teaches and creates her own pottery in her studio in downtown Tahlequah.

== Early life ==
Osti was born in the Rocky Ford area of Tahlequah. Osti's father started out as a miner and in the later half of his life he raised cattle and was a rancher. Her Cherokee mother died when she was five years old. Osti did not have much exposure to art until she lived alone. She participated in art class in fourth and fifth grade but did not have any other opportunities outside of that. Osti attended Oaks Mission High School.

=== Education ===
Osti was married and started a family and did not start college classes until she was 33, when she took classes at a community college in San Francisco. In 1985, Osti moved back to Tahlequah and took the rest of her classes at Northeastern State University. Osti finished her Bachelor of Arts in art in 1989 and continued on to her master's at NSU immediately after. She graduated with her Master's of Science in education in 1992.

== Introduction into art ==
The classes that Osti took with professor Jerry Choate were influential for her later career as a three-dimensional artist. After finishing her first pottery class and while taking a Cherokee history course, Osti decided to interview Anna Mitchell for a paper. Mitchell soon became Osti's teacher, mentor, and friend. During this time, Osti switched her focus from the 2-dimensional to the three-dimensional and really fell in love with pottery.

=== Style and notable works ===
Osti's work draws from ancient Mississippian culture and prehistoric southeastern woodland. Osti specializes in coil and slab construction, stone polishing, as well as glazing, and raku-firing. The images typically convey abstract animals and landscape with symbols of celestial activity, protection, and endurance.

She further specializes in complex stamped patterns using wooden paddles with intricately carved designs (one paddle is fiber covered, representing the first type of paddles used). The paddle stamping evokes the ancient traditions of better heat distribution and a more secure hand grip to prevent slippage, while adding immeasurable beauty to an everyday utilitarian object. Rim notching and complex patterns of incised traditional designs are often intermixed with designs drawn from nature to generate other Jane Osti signature motifs.

== Awards and achievements ==
Osti has won awards at many exhibitions, including awards from:

- Santa Fe Indian Market
- Five Civilized Tribes Museum
- Red Earth Indian Arts Festival
- Grand prize at the 10th annual Cherokee Homecoming Art Show and Sale, Cherokee Nation Enterprises, the Oklahoma Arts Council and the National Endowment for the Arts

In 2005, Osti was one of the youngest Cherokee artists to be designated a Living Treasure by Cherokee Nation.

Her work Tall squash pot was acquired by the Smithsonian American Art Museum as part of the Renwick Gallery's 50th Anniversary Campaign.

Her works The Abundance, A Sacred Fire and Spirit of Survival were acquired in 2026 and are displayed at the Crystal Bridges Museum of American Art in Bentonville, Arkansas.
