= Joe Eddins =

American politician (born 1934)

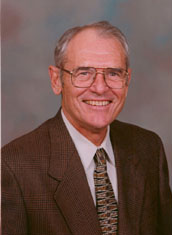
- Eddins in 2004

Member of the Oklahoma House of Representatives from the 6th district
- In office 1995–2007
- Preceded by: George Vaughn
- Succeeded by: Chuck Hoskin

Personal details
- Born: October 7, 1934 (age 91) Muskogee, Oklahoma, US
- Party: Democratic
- Education: University of Oklahoma (B.A.)
- Known for: Establishing universal preschool in Oklahoma

Joe T. Eddins (born October 7, 1934) is an American politician who served as a Democratic representative in the Oklahoma House of Representatives from 1995 to 2007. Eddins is best known for helping implement universal preschool in a conservative state.

Eddins graduated from the University of Oklahoma, earning a Bachelor of Arts. Before entering the Oklahoma House, he served on the Vinita city council and the Vinita school board. He was a cattleman for 25 years, and taught math and science to high school students.

Eddins first ran for election to the Oklahoma House in 1992, but was unsuccessful. He was elected in 1994, and reelected every two years until he was term-limited in 2006. He was succeeded by fellow Democrat Chuck Hoskin.

== Early life ==
Joe T. Eddins was born on October 7, 1934, in Muskogee, Oklahoma, to Earl and Katherine Eddins. He earned a Bachelor of Arts from the University of Oklahoma in 1953, and completed some graduate work at Northeastern State University. He taught high school math and science for seven years, and worked as a cattleman for 25 years.

== Political career ==
Before his election to the Oklahoma House of Representatives, Eddins served as a city councilman for Vinita, Oklahoma for two years, and was a member of the Vinita school board for three. Eddins ran unsuccessfully to represent Oklahoma State House district 6 in 1992, but lost to incumbent George Vaughn in the primary election. Vaughn retired before the 1994 Oklahoma House election, and Eddins won the race to succeed him with 52.3% of the general election vote. He served in the legislature from 1995 to 2007. He was term limited in 2006 and succeeded by Chuck Hoskin.

=== Universal preschool ===
State schools in Oklahoma receive funding depending on the number of students enrolled. Due to Oklahoma's declining population, schools were experiencing decreased enrollment numbers, which led to less state funding. To compensate for this loss, some Oklahoma schools were enrolling four-year-olds in kindergarten. Because kindergarten was intended for older children, the four-year-olds were struggling to learn.

Eddins introduced legislation in 1998 to resolve this issue. He advertised his bill as preventing four year olds from enrolling in kindergarten, which it did. But he was relatively quiet about how it accomplished this objective: by funding schools to establish optional preschool for four year olds. It also gave school districts the ability to house preschool programs in different locations, such as "tribal programs, churches, and assisted-living facilities". It allowed contracting with the private sector, which won support from Republicans.

Enrollment is optional. As of the 2016–2017 school year, 73% of four-year-olds in Oklahoma participate.

== Personal life ==
Eddins has three sons with his wife, Suzanne.

== Election results ==
Oklahoma's 6th House district Democratic primary, 1992
Party	Candidate	Votes	%
Democratic	George Vaughn (incumbent)	3,811	54.1%
Democratic	Joe Eddins	3,232	45.9%
Total votes		7,043	100%

Oklahoma's 6th House district, 1994
Party	Candidate	Votes	%
Democratic	Joe Eddins	5,494	52.3
Republican	Mike Roark	5,004	47.7
Total votes		10,498	100
Democratic hold			

Oklahoma's 6th House district, 1996
Party	Candidate	Votes	%
Democratic	Joe Eddins (incumbent)	6,915	52.6
Republican	Jay Franklin	6,235	47.4
Total votes		13,150	100
Democratic hold			

Oklahoma's 6th House district, 1998
Party	Candidate	Votes	%
Democratic	Joe Eddins (incumbent)	6,439	64.6
Republican	Wayne Jolly	3,532	35.4
Total votes		9,971	100
Democratic hold			

Oklahoma's 6th House district, 2000
Party	Candidate	Votes	%
Democratic	Joe Eddins (incumbent)	8,675	61.2
Republican	Jim Dembowski	5,508	38.8
Total votes		14,183	100
Democratic hold			

Oklahoma's 6th House district, 2002
Party	Candidate	Votes	%
Democratic	Joe Eddins (incumbent)	6,614	61.9
Republican	Chris Moore	4,070	38.1
Total votes		10,684	100
Democratic hold			

Oklahoma's 6th House district, 2004
Party	Candidate	Votes	%
Democratic	Joe Eddins (incumbent)	Unopposed	
Democratic hold			
