= Janelle Fullbright =

Cherokee politician and educator (1945–2016)

Deputy Speaker of the Cherokee Nation Tribal Council
- In office August 29, 2013 – August 2015
- Succeeded by: Victoria Vazquez

Cherokee Nation Tribal Councilor for the 6th district
- In office 2007 – August 2015
- Preceded by: Position established
- Succeeded by: Bryan Warner

Personal details
- Born: Janelle Echo Lattimore; December 11, 1945 Sequoyah County, Oklahoma, U.S.
- Died: December 10, 2016 (aged 70) Sallisaw, Oklahoma, U.S.
- Citizenship: Cherokee Nation; United States
- Children: 2
- Education: Northeastern State University

Janelle Echo Lattimore Fullbright (December 11, 1945 – December 10, 2016) was a Cherokee politician and educator who was a member of the Cherokee Nation Tribal Council representing District 6 from 2007 to 2015. She served as the deputy speaker from 2013 to 2015.

== Life ==
Fullbright was born on December 11, 1945, to S. Loyd Lattimore and Juanita Garvin Lattimore in the Akins/Miller Ridge Community near Akins, Oklahoma. She was a Cherokee Nation citizen. The youngest of three children, Fullbright graduated from Central High School in the early 1960s. She earned a bachelor's degree in education from Northeastern State University and later obtained two master's degree.

Fullbright was an elementary school teacher at Central Elementary. She was involved in her community as a member of the First Presbyterian Church in Sallisaw. Fullbright married Alfred Fullbright on March 26, 1964, and they had two children. In 1996, Fullbright was appointed by principal chief Joe Byrd to the Cherokee Nation gaming commission.

Fullbright served on the Cherokee Nation Tribal Council for district 6 from 2007 to 2015. During this period, she was served a two-year term as deputy speaker starting on August 29, 2013. Fullbright was chair of the health committee. She supported the establishment of a dialysis center at the Redbird Smith Health Center in Sallisaw, the re-establishment of the Cherokee Nation Housing Authority, the expansion of the Cherokee Casino Roland, and the increase of the Cherokee Nation Higher Education Scholarship. Term limited, Fullbright was succeeded by Bryan Warner. In 2015, principal chief Bill John Baker awarded Fullbright the Cherokee Nation Statesman Award. The same year, he appointed her to the Cherokee Nation Business Board. In this role, she served on the audit, governance and legal and cultural committees. Fullbright died on December 10, 2016, in her home in Sallisaw.

== See also ==
- List of Native American politicians
- Native American women in politics
