= Chuck Hoskin =

American politician

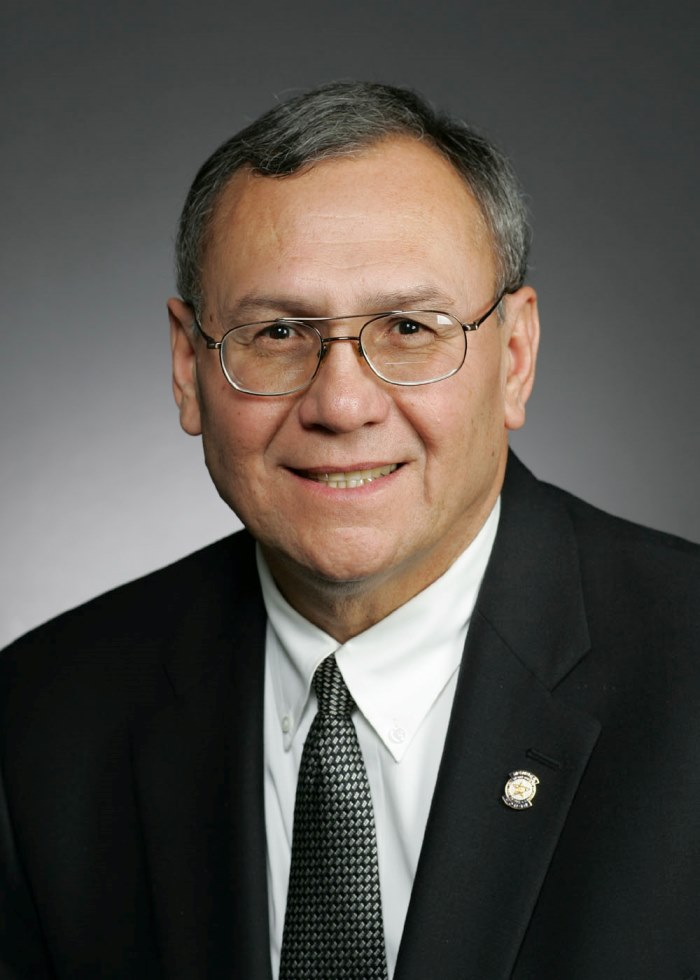
- Hoskin in 2007

Mayor of Vinita, Oklahoma
- In office 2019–2023
- Preceded by: Ronnie Starks
- Succeeded by: Josh D. Lee

Member of the Oklahoma House of Representatives from the 6th district
- In office 2006–2018
- Preceded by: Joe Eddins
- Succeeded by: Rusty Cornwell

Personal details
- Born: January 29, 1952 (age 74) Claremore, Oklahoma, U.S.
- Citizenship: American; Cherokee Nation
- Party: Democratic
- Spouse: Stephanie
- Children: Amy; Chuck; Amelia
- Education: Northeastern Oklahoma A&M College (AA); Northeastern State University (BA, MEd)

Military service
- Allegiance: United States
- Branch/service: United States Navy

Chuck Hoskin Sr. is a Cherokee and American politician and former member of the Oklahoma House of Representatives from the 6th district, which includes parts of Craig, Mayes, and Rogers counties. He served as a whip for the Democratic caucus. After leaving the House he served for four years as the Mayor of Vinita, Oklahoma. He is a citizen of the Cherokee Nation, and he served from 1995 to 2007 as a member of the Tribal Council, and in 2011 became Chief of Staff for the Principal Chief, Baker. In 2019 his son, Chuck Hoskin Jr., was elected Principal Chief of Cherokee Nation.

== Early life ==
Hoskin was born on January 29, 1952, in Claremore, Oklahoma.

After graduating from Vinita High School in 1970, he enlisted in the U.S. Navy. He was stationed aboard USS Independence until his honorable discharge. After the Navy, he received his AA degree from Northeastern Oklahoma A&M College and his BA and M.Ed from Northeastern State University. Before being elected to office, he served as an administrator for Locust Grove Public Schools in Locust Grove, Oklahoma.

== Personal life ==
He is married to Stephanie, a former student and basketball player he coached her senior year after graduation and has three children: Amy, Charles Jr., and Amelia.

== Political career ==
Hoskin was elected to the House in 2006, defeating Republican Wayland Smalley in the 2006 election, after the incumbent, Joe Eddins, retired.

Hoskin served on the Appropriations & Budget, Public Safety, Veterans & Military Affairs committees, as well as the Redistricting Eastern Oklahoma Subcommittee and the Joint Committee on Appropriations & Budget.

Hoskin was elected as Mayor of Vinita, Oklahoma in 2019. He replaced former Mayor Ronnie Starks. In 2023 he lost his bid for reelection to challenger Josh Lee.

=== Election results ===
2014 Oklahoma State House District 6 election
Democratic	Chuck Hoskin	5,409	59.7%	
Republican	Marshall Scott McGuire	3,647	40.3%	
Turnout		9,056		
Party	Candidate	Votes	%	±%

2006 Oklahoma State House District 6 election
Democratic	Chuck Hoskin	6,334	60.96%	
Republican	Wayland Smalley	4,057	39.04%	
Turnout		10,391		
Party	Candidate	Votes	%	±%

== Cherokee Nation service ==
A citizen of the Cherokee Nation, Hoskin served for 12 years on the Tribal Council, from 1995 to 2007. Hoskin also served as Chief of Staff to Principal Chief Bill John Baker.
