= William Wilson Fulbright =

American pioneer (1785–1843)

William Wilson Fulbright (January 8, 1785 – September 22, 1843) was one of the early pioneers and settlers of Springfield, Missouri. Although the founding of Springfield, Missouri, is often dated to 1829 when John Polk Campbell and his brother carved their initials in an ash tree with the intention of returning to the area, William Wilson Fulbright and his family moved and settled in the area in 1830 before the Campbell family returned.

== Biography ==
Born in Lincoln County, North Carolina, William Fulbright and his family moved to Haywood County, North Carolina in 1797. He could speak German. Fulbright served in the War of 1812 as a private in a regiment of North Carolina State Troops between February 1814 and July 1814, stationed at Fort Benjamin Hawkins in Georgia. After the War of 1812, he moved his family to the Territory of Missouri and to Henry County and Madison County in Tennessee before finally settling in southwestern Missouri.

In 1830, he and his brother John acquired 160 acres of land near Jones Springs, and William Fulbright erected the first cabin in what would become Springfield near the 1200 block of West College Street. This cabin hosted the first church and the first church service, both Methodist. Only nine families lived in Springfield at the time. In 1833, Fulbright built the first church structure in Springfield as a one-room log cabin. This church was named the Kickapoo Meeting House as the land had been deeded to the Kickapoo Indians with Methodist and Presbyterians using this building until the Methodist congregation moved closer to town. Removal of the Kickapoo Indian began on October 24, 1832.

Fulbright also built a still house in Greene County, Missouri in 1832, later operated as the first gristmill there. In 1860, his son John rebuilt this old gristmill (adding a cotton gin and carding machine) and operated it in connection with his farming. The Fulbright spring (named for William Fulbright) supplied the water power for the mill, which continued to operate for about 25 years.

In or around 1835, his son Henry opened one of the first general stores in Springfield, trading in goods from St. Louis. By 1835, the settlement of Fulbright and Campbell Springs had been given the name of Springfield. In 1840, William Wilson Fulbright entered into a partnership with his sons Henry and Ephraim to operate Henry's store.

William Wilson Fulbright died in 1843. When he died, he owned 19 slaves, down from the 30 slaves he had when he left Tennessee in 1829.

In 1929, a marker was set in the retaining wall on the College Street commemorating Fulbright's role in settling of Springfield.
