= Victoria Vazquez =

American artist and politician

Deputy Speaker of the Cherokee Nation Tribal Council
- In office September 14, 2015 – August 29, 2024
- Preceded by: Janelle Fullbright
- Succeeded by: Kevin Easley Jr.

Cherokee Nation Tribal Councilor for the 11th district
- In office October 22, 2013 – August 29, 2024
- Preceded by: Chuck Hoskin Jr.
- Succeeded by: Kendra McGeady

Personal details
- Citizenship: American; Cherokee Nation
- Parent: Anna Sixkiller Mitchell (mother)
- Awards: Cherokee National Treasure

Victoria Vazquez is a Cherokee Nation artist and politician who served on the Cherokee Nation Tribal Council from 2013 to 2024. She was named a Cherokee National Treasure in 2012.

== Early life and artistic career ==
Victoria Mitchell was born to Anna Sixkiller Mitchell and Robert Clay Mitchell. Her mother was a Cherokee artist credited with reviving traditional Southeastern Woodlands-style pottery. Victoria was awarded a Smithsonian Native Arts Fellowship in 2005 and her work is displayed National Museum of the American Indian. She was named a Cherokee National Treasure in 2012 for her traditional pottery. She worked as a self-employed potter and pottery teacher for twenty years before running for office.

== Cherokee Nation tribal council ==
In August 2013, Chuck Hoskin Jr. resigned from the Cherokee Nation tribal council's 11th district seat to serve as the Nation's Secretary of State. Vazquez ran in the October special election for the seat against Dana Jim and Lana Morris Daugherty. She won the special election and was sworn in on October 22, 2013. On September 14, 2015, she was sworn in as the deputy speaker of the Cherokee Nation tribal council after being elected by fellow councillors the month prior. She was re-elected without opposition in 2017 after her only opponent to file was disqualified by the Cherokee Nation Election Commission and sworn in for a second term on August 14. She was re-elected deputy speaker of the tribal council on August 15, 2017. In 2021 she won re-election with 63% of the vote beating Mike Purcell, Randy Junior White, and Mason Hudson. She was re-elected as deputy speaker again in 2021. She resigned on August 29, 2024.

== See also ==
- List of Native American politicians
- Native American women in politics
