= Josh D. Lee =

American lawyer (born 1979)

Josh D. Lee J.D., M.S., NREMT
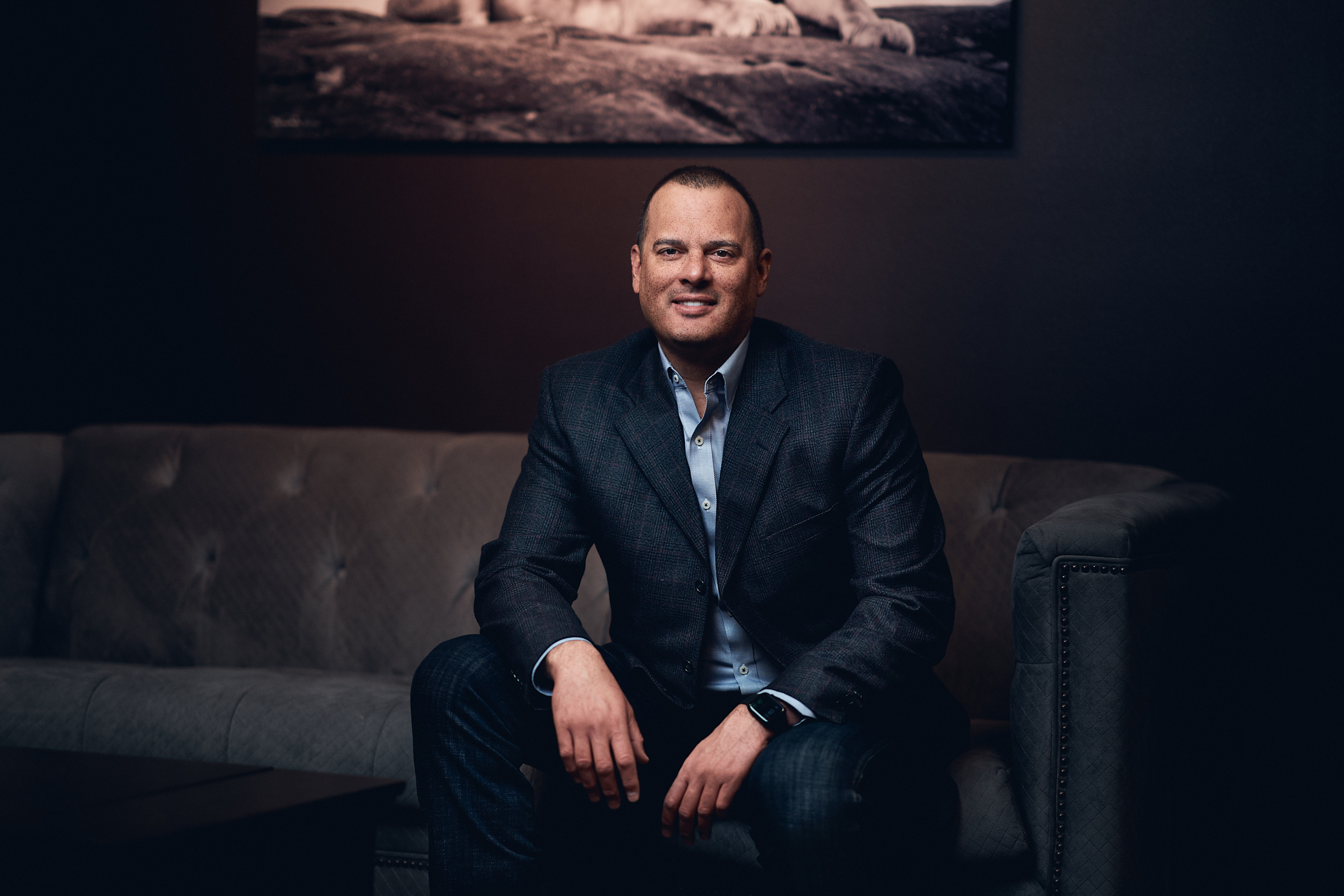
- Josh D. Lee
- Born: November 21, 1979 (age 46); Vinita, Oklahoma, U.S.
- Education: Juris Doctor with honors University of Tulsa College of Law, Master of Science in Pharmacy University of Florida, Bachelor of Science in Business Information Technology Rogers State University, Associates of Arts in Criminal Justice Northeastern Oklahoma A&M
- Occupation: Criminal defense lawyer

Mayor of Vinita, Oklahoma
- Incumbent
- Assumed office 2023
- Preceded by: Chuck Hoskin
- Website: The Lee Firm

Josh D. Lee (born November 21, 1979, in Vinita, Oklahoma) is an American lawyer based in Vinita, Oklahoma. As a founder at The Lee Firm, his practice focuses on DUI/DWI, alcohol-related, and drug charges. He has also advocated for open government and has filed lawsuits against governments in the State of Oklahoma to enforce Oklahoma's Open Records law.

== Early life and education ==
Lee was born and raised in Vinita, Oklahoma, as the only child of Jack and Dolores Lee. After graduating from high school, he worked as a 911 dispatcher and later served as a police officer for the Vinita Police Department.

Lee pursued higher education in multiple disciplines. He earned an Associate of Arts degree in Criminal Justice from Northeastern Oklahoma A&M College in Miami, Oklahoma. He then obtained a Bachelor of Science in Business Information Technology, specializing in Software and Multimedia Design, from Rogers State University in Claremore, Oklahoma.

In 2007, Lee graduated with honors from the University of Tulsa College of Law, earning his Juris Doctor (J.D.) degree. He continued his education in forensic science, obtaining a Master of Science in pharmacy from the University of Florida in 2016.

== Legal career ==
Josh D. Lee began his legal career as a licensed intern with the Tulsa County District Attorney's Office, where he worked on the Major Crimes Team before transitioning to private practice. In 2007, Lee joined Clinton M. Ward in Vinita, Oklahoma, forming the law firm Ward & Lee, PLC. The firm is now The Lee Firm and is located on historic Route 66 in downtown Vinita.

Lee also received the 2023–24 Marian Opala First Amendment Award due his role as attorney and plaintiff in Ward & Lee v. City of Claremore, which established that police dash-camera recordings are subject to disclosure under the Oklahoma Open Records Act, and also for starting the free public resource FOIBible.com.

== Notable cases ==
Lee's published appellate advocacy includes open government cases, such as Ward & Lee, PLC v City of Claremore, 2014 OK CIV APP 1, which addressed the public's right to access police and sheriff dash cam recordings under the Oklahoma Open Records Act.

Lee filed a lawsuit against Washington and Nowata County District Judge Curtis DeLapp, alleging abuses of power. The Oklahoma Supreme Court subsequently filed a removal petition against Judge DeLapp accusing him of "gross neglect" and "oppression in office." Judge DeLapp resigned from the bench and withdrew his bid for reelection. In July 2020, Reuters Investigates published a series on judicial misconduct in the United States titled "Teflon Robe." Part 2, "Emboldened By Impunity," discussed the conduct of Judge DeLapp and Lee's role in the case.

In DUI and criminal law, he has been the attorney of record for the following cases:

- Exonerations of Malcolm Scott and De'Marchoe Carpenter: On May 19, 2016, a Tulsa County District Judge found Scott and Carpenter "actually innocent" of a 1994 drive-by shooting that resulted in prison sentences of Life + 170 years. Scott and Carpenter became the 31st and 32nd individuals exonerated in Oklahoma since 1989. The 21 years and 8 months they spent in prison as wrongfully convicted men was the longest served among the previous 30 exonerees in Oklahoma. Lee, along with Oklahoma Innocence Project Legal Director Christina Green, represented Scott in this matter. His closing argument from the January 29, 2016 hearing was noted by journalists and local court watchers. He also represented both Scott and Carpenter when District Attorney Steve Kunzweiler appealed the exonerations.
- Andrews v. State, 2014 OK CIV APP 19: In this case, the appellate court ruled that paramedics are not authorized to perform blood withdrawals under Oklahoma's Implied Consent Law.
- State v. Mayes: The charges against a 74-year-old woman were dismissed at the preliminary hearing after authorities seized marijuana and cash from her residence.

== Political career ==
Since 2023, Lee has served as the mayor of Vinita, Oklahoma. He ran for mayor after suing Vinita over COVID restrictions that the city had put in place in 2020.

== Publications and commentary ==
Josh D. Lee has contributed to discussions on forensic science and legal issues in publications including Chemistry World, Colorado Springs Independent, and Chemical & Engineering News. He has authored chapters in legal texts, including Understanding DUI Scientific Evidence (2011 Edition), and The Legality of Search and Seizure in DUI Cases, along with articles for The South Carolina Bar Association, Tennessee Criminal Defense Lawyers Association, and Texas Criminal Defense Lawyers Association.

== Professional associations ==
- Freedom of Information Oklahoma, Inc., Board of Directors
- Chemistry and the Law Division of the American Chemical Society, Executive Committee Member/Forensic Science Co-Chairman

== Recognition ==
In 2018, Lee received the Fern Holland Courageous Lawyer Award from the Oklahoma Bar Association. He was featured in Oklahoma Magazine's 40 Under 40 list for 2018. In 2014, Freedom of Information Oklahoma, Inc. recognized the law firm of Ward, Lee, & Coats, PLC, Josh Lee, and Steve Fabian, with an honorable mention for the Ben Blackstock Award. He has also been recognized by state and national defense-related organizations. FOI Oklahoma listed Josh D. Lee as the recipient for their 2023-24 Marian Opala First Amendment Award.
