= Meredith Frailey =

Cherokee Nation politician

Cherokee Nation Tribal Councilor for the 6th district, Seat 2
- In office August 14, 2007 – August 14, 2013
- Preceded by: Position established
- Succeeded by: Position disestablished

Cherokee Nation Tribal Councilor for the 6th district
- In office August 14, 2003 – August 14, 2007 Serving with Johnny Keener
- Preceded by: Stephanie Wickliffe-Shepherd
- Succeeded by: Multi-member district disestablished

Personal details
- Education: Northeastern State University; University of Tulsa College of Law

Meredith Frailey is a Cherokee Nation politician who served on the Cherokee Nation tribal council from 2003 to 2013.

== Education ==
Meredith Frailey graduated from Locust Grove High School and went on to earn her bachelor's degree from Northeastern State University and a Juris Doctor from the University of Tulsa College of Law.

== Tribal Council ==
Frailey was first elected to the Cherokee Nation tribal council in 2003 in the multi-member district 6 alongside incumbent Johnny Keener, and defeating incumbent Stephanie Wickliffe-Shepherd. In 2006, she was elected Speaker of the Tribal Council for a two-year term. After an amendment to election law split multi-member districts, Frailey ran unopposed for the new District 6, Seat 2 in 2007. In 2009, Frailey attended the inauguration of U.S. president Barack Obama. After another round of redistricting, Frailey lost her re-election campaign for the new 15th district to Janees Taylor in 2013. Principal Chief Chad Smith filed a lawsuit on her behalf requesting a runoff between her and Taylor, but the Cherokee Nation Supreme Court ruled against the lawsuit.

In 2021, Frailey ran in the 2021 Cherokee Nation tribal council elections for district 15. She lost the election to Danny Callison.

== Deputy chief campaigns ==
In 2019, Frailey ran for deputy chief of the Cherokee Nation against Bryan Warner and Linda Sacks. Warner won the general election and avoided a runoff with 58% of the vote.

Frailey ran in the 2023 Cherokee Nation deputy chief election and lost to incumbent deputy chief Bryan Warner.

== Electoral history ==
2023 Cherokee Nation Principal Chief Election
Candidate	Votes	%
Bryan Warner	10,300	61.54%
David Walkingstick	4,901	29.28%
Meredith Frailey	1,147	6.85%
Bill Pearson	389	2.32%
Total votes	16,737	100%

== See also ==
- List of Native American politicians
- Native American women in politics
