= Bryan Warner =

Cherokee Nation politician

Deputy Principal Chief of the Cherokee Nation
- Incumbent
- Assumed office August 14, 2019
- Preceded by: Joe Crittenden

Member of the Cherokee Nation Tribal Council from the 6th district
- In office August 14, 2015 – August 14, 2019
- Preceded by: Janelle Fullbright
- Succeeded by: Daryl Legg

Personal details
- Party: Democratic
- Education: Northeastern State University (BS); East Central University (MS)

Bryan Warner is a Cherokee Nation politician who has served as the deputy principal chief of the Cherokee Nation since 2019 and who served as the Cherokee Nation tribal councilor for the 6th district from 2015 to 2019.

== Early life and education ==
Warner graduated from Northeastern State University in 2009 with a Bachelor's degree in organismic biology. He later earned a master's degree from East Central University and taught science courses at Carl Albert State College.

== Cherokee Nation tribal council ==
Warner ran for the Cherokee Nation tribal council district 6 in 2015 in a four candidate race against: Ron Goff, Natalie Fullbright, and B. Keith McCoy. Incumbent Janelle Fullbright was term limited. Warner advanced to a runoff alongside Natalie Fullbright after placing second in the June 27 election. Warner won the runoff with 54% of the vote and was sworn on August 14, 2015. In 2017, he was appointed to a two-year term on the Centers for Disease Control Agency for Toxic Substances and Disease Registry Tribal Advisory Committee.

== Deputy chief of the Cherokee Nation ==
In 2019, Warner ran for deputy chief of the Cherokee Nation. Robin Mayes challenged Warner's candidacy, but the challenge was dismissed by the Cherokee Nation Supreme Court. He faced Meredith Frailey in the general election. He won with 58.88% of the vote. The Cherokee Nation Supreme Court rejected a challenge to the Warner's election alleging he violated election law because the Election Commission had found prior complaints without merit. He was sworn on August 14, 2019. In 2021, he was again appointed to another two-year term on the Centers for Disease Control Agency for Toxic Substances and Disease Registry Tribal Advisory Committee. He ran for re-election in the 2023 Cherokee Nation deputy chief election and won re-election. Since his re-election, he is term-limited from running for deputy chief again until 2031.

== Electoral history ==
2023 Cherokee Nation Deputy Principal Chief Election
Candidate	Votes	%
Bryan Warner	10,300	61.54%
David Walkingstick	4,901	29.28%
Meredith Frailey	1,147	6.85%
Bill Pearson	389	2.32%
Total votes	16,737	100%
