= Chuck Hoskin Jr. =

Principal Chief of the Cherokee Nation since 2019

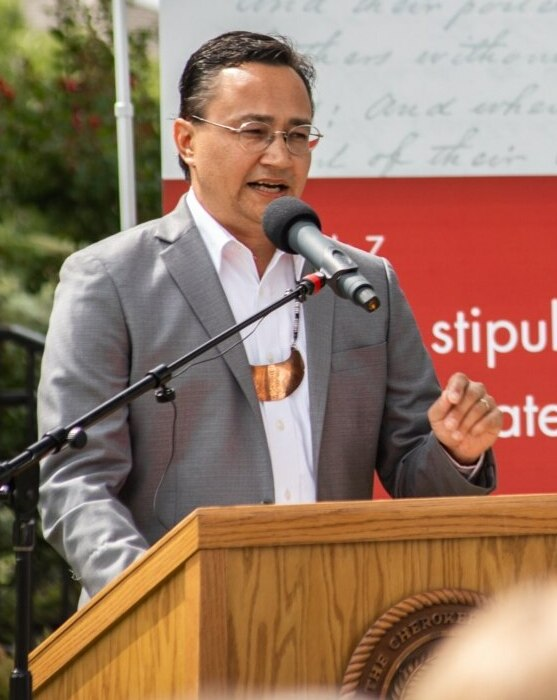
- Hoskin speaking in 2019

8th Principal Chief of the Cherokee Nation
- Incumbent
- Assumed office August 14, 2019
- Deputy: Bryan Warner
- Preceded by: Bill John Baker

Member of the Cherokee Nation Tribal Council
- In office August 14, 2013 – August 21, 2013
- Preceded by: Redistricting
- Succeeded by: Victoria Vazquez
- Constituency: 11th district
- In office August 14, 2007 – August 14, 2013
- Preceded by: Chuck Hoskin Sr.
- Succeeded by: Redistricting
- Constituency: 9th district

Personal details
- Born: February 7, 1975 (age 51)
- Citizenship: Cherokee Nation; United States
- Party: Democratic
- Relatives: Chuck Hoskin Sr. (father)
- Education: University of Oklahoma (BA, JD)

Chuck Hoskin Jr. (born February 7, 1975) is a Cherokee Nation politician and attorney currently serving as the Principal Chief of the Cherokee Nation since 2019. He was re-elected to a second term in the 2023 Cherokee Nation principal chief election.

Hoskin has previously served as a Tribal Councilor for the Cherokee Nation between 2007 and 2013 and as the Secretary of State for the Cherokee Nation between 2013 and 2019.

== Early life and education ==
Chuck Hoskin Jr. was born on February 7, 1975. His father is Chuck Hoskin. His mother is Patricia Christian Helton. He graduated from Vinita High School in 1993. He then attended the University of Oklahoma and graduated in 1997 with his Bachelors of Arts. In 2000, he graduated from the University of Oklahoma College of Law with his Juris Doctor.

He told NPR in 2022 that he was not taught about the freedmen growing up, that the Cherokee owned slaves, nor that the Cherokee sided with the Confederate States of America during the American Civil War. He views freedman citizenship in the Cherokee Nation as a treaty right and that the Freedman Controversy happened because the "Cherokee Nation is a large tribe, and so there are Cherokees who, just like the larger society...do not like Black people. And there is some racism."

== Career ==
In 1999, Hoskin served as a delegate at the Cherokee constitutional convention. Prior to elected office, he worked as an agent for the National Labor Relations Board.

In the 2007 Cherokee elections, Hoskin ran for Cherokee Tribal Council in district 9 after his father Chuck Hoskin announced he would not seek reelection. He faced Rodney Lay in the election for a six-year term. On June 23, 2007, Chuck Hoskin Jr. was elected to the Cherokee Tribal Council with 69% of the vote. He was sworn in on August 14, 2007.

In 2011, Hoskin was one of Bill John Baker's lawyers during his recount efforts after the 2011 Cherokee Principal Chief election. On February 23, 2012, Hoskin was voted deputy speaker of the Cherokee Nation Tribal Council and served from February 23, 2012, to August 21, 2013. Hoskin ran unopposed for his Tribal Council seat in the 2013 Cherokee elections, which due to redistricting was now district 11, being sworn in on August 14, 2013.

In August 2013, Hoskin was nominated and confirmed to be the Cherokee Nation's Secretary of State by Principal Chief Bill John Baker. He resigned his Cherokee Tribal Council seat and was sworn in on August 21, 2013, triggering a special election that was won by Victoria Vazquez.

In March 2016, Hoskin was unanimously reconfirmed to serve as the Cherokee Nation's Secretary of State until March 2020.

== Principal Chief of the Cherokee Nation ==
Hoskin resigned as Secretary of State on February 6, 2019, to file run for Principal Chief of the Cherokee Nation. He was elected on June 1, 2019, having received 57 percent of the vote. Before taking his oath of office, he announced his intent to invest $30 million into repairing homes for Cherokees who have previously been on a waiting list under the tribe's housing rehabilitation program. Hoskin met with more than 100 employees of the Cherokee Nation on August 7, a week before his inauguration, and surprised them by revealing plans to raise the tribe's minimum wage for government employees to $11 per hour, up from the previous minimum wage of $9.50 per hour. He later encouraged the board of directors of the business arm of the tribe, Cherokee Nation Businesses, to follow the government's lead and to also raise its minimum wage.

He was sworn in as Principal Chief of the Cherokee Nation during a ceremony held in Tahlequah, Oklahoma, on Wednesday, August 14, 2019, alongside newly elected Deputy Principal Chief Bryan Warner. On August 22, Hoskin announced his plan to nominate Cherokee Nation Vice President of Government Relations Kim Teehee as the first Cherokee Nation delegate to Congress. Hoskin said the Cherokee Nation delegate is referenced in both the Treaty of Hopewell from 1785 and the Treaty of New Echota from 1835 between the Cherokee Nation and the federal government. The Treaty of 1866 also reaffirms all previous treaties between the Cherokee Nation and the United States, Hoskin states.

Hoskin and Warner also proposed the creation of the Cherokee Nation's first Secretary of Veterans Affairs, which, upon approval, will be a cabinet-level position. Hoskin has nominated former Deputy Principal Chief Joe Crittenden, a Vietnam-era Navy veteran, to hold this position.

He ran for re-election in the 2023 Cherokee Nation principal chief election and received over 50% of the vote on the first round, avoiding a runoff. After his re-election, he is term-limited from running for principal chief again until 2031.

=== Relationship with Stitt administration ===
Hoskin has criticized Governor Kevin Stitt for pushing back against the McGirt decision, saying that "the governor 'is trying to convince the public that there is chaos because of McGirt where there is not chaos" and that Stitt "has been bent on destroying the tribes.” In July 2022, Hoskin issued an executive order that no Oklahoma state flag should be flown on Cherokee property, but later restored the flags due to backlash.

After the overturning of Roe v. Wade, Hoskin said that Stitt, who had gone on FOX News to say that Hoskin's and other tribes were planning to offer abortion services, made “grossly false" statements, and also said that the Cherokee Nation currently doesn’t provide reproductive health services. He also stated he had heard of no other tribe in the state making plans to do so.

After the federal supreme court ruled in Oklahoma v. Castro-Huerta in favor of Oklahoma, Hoskin wrote that "this decision is a betrayal to our sovereign nations in Oklahoma, and it will have far reaching impacts on all federally-recognized tribes."

Hoskin endorsed Stitt's opponent, Democrat Joy Hofmeister, in the 2022 election.

== Personal ==
Hoskin resides in his hometown of Vinita, Oklahoma, with his wife, January. They have two children. He is a member of the Cherokee Nation and Oklahoma Bar Associations. He is a member of the Democratic Party.

Political offices
Preceded by Bill John Baker	Principal Chief of the Cherokee Nation; 2019–present	Incumbent
