= Giovanni Aloi =

Italian art historian (born 1976)

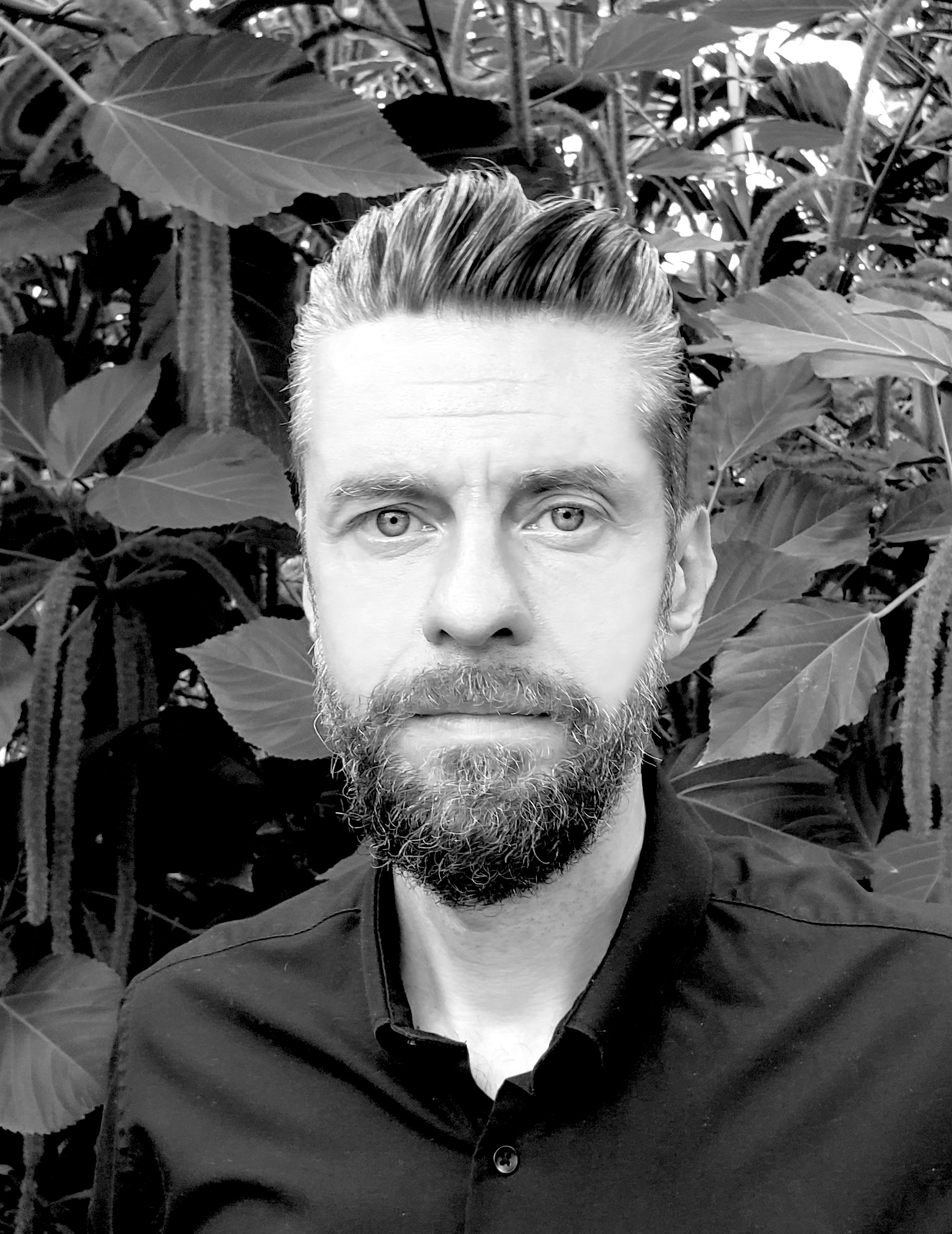
- Giovanni Aloi
- Born: 1976 (age 49–50); Italy
- Education: Liceo Artistico S. Marta; London College of Communication; Goldsmiths, University of London
- Occupations: Author, curator, art historian
- Employer: School of the Art Institute of Chicago
- Notable work: Art & Animals (2011); Speculative Taxidermy (2018); Lucian Freud: Plant Portraits (2022)
- Title: Founder and Editor-in-Chief of Antennae: The Journal of Nature in Visual Culture
- Website: www.aloi.info

Giovanni Aloi (born 1976) is an Italian author and curator specializing in the representation of nature in modern and contemporary art. He teaches art history and visual culture at School of the Art Institute of Chicago. He is the Founder and Editor in Chief of Antennae: The Journal of Nature in Visual Culture and is the co-editor of the University of Minnesota Press book series Art after Nature. Aloi is also USA correspondent for Esse Magazine Art+Opinion.

== Education ==
Aloi studied history of art and art practice in Milan at the Liceo Artistico S. Marta and moved to London in 1997 where he gained a BTEC in Photographic Studies and Printing Technique at the London College of Communication. He then furthered his education at Goldsmiths University with a Post Graduate Diploma in Art History (2003), an MA in Visual Culture (2004), and Ph.D. on the subject of Natural History and Contemporary Art (2014).

== Career ==
Between 1999 and 2004, Aloi worked in the Education Department at Whitechapel Art Gallery. While in 2007 he began to work at Tate Galleries in London as associate faculty.

At the same time, Aloi taught Modern and Contemporary Art at Queen Mary University of London (2006-2014), Roehampton University (2009-2013), and Sotheby's Institute of Art (2012 to today).

== Radio, TV, and presentations ==
In 2013, Aloi contributed to a documentary film titled Royal Pets: One's Best Friend, part of a series The Royals. In July 2014, Aloi contributed to the BBC Radio 3 program titled Animals and Anthropomorphism along with animal-studies expert Susan McHugh and novelist Karen Joy Fowler. In June 2015, Aloi also contribute to a BBC Radio 4 program titled Butterflies. And in 2016, he contributed to the episode of the same series dedicated to the lobster in art and culture. In 2020, Aloi was interviewed by Ferren Gipson for Art Matters Podcast, Art UK. In 2021, Aloi was in conversation on WLPN with co-curator and artist Andrew Yang about the exhibition Earthly Observatory. Aloi has appeared multiple times on the PBS Lake Shore program Roundtable Perspecives.

Aloi has presented at the Getty Center, New York Botanic Garden, Dulwich Picture Gallery, Natural History Museum in London, Tate Modern, The Royal Institute of Great Britain, Cambridge University, The Art Institute of Chicago, The Chicago Museum of Contemporary Art and the Courtauld Institute of Art.

== Conferences ==
Aloi has organized, chaired, and keynoted symposia on nature and posthumanism in modern and contemporary art since the early 2000s. Animal Ecologies in Visual Culture was held in 2011 at UCL in London. The symposium proposed an exploration of artistic practices involved with animals and environments. Through a multidisciplinary approach, it aimed at facilitating a dialogue between artists, scientists, and academics interested in informing wider audiences through visual communication. In 2012, With Professor Anthony Podbersceck, Aloi co-organized ISAZ2012, held between 11 and 13 July 2012, Murray Edwards College, Cambridge, UK.

In 2016, with artist Andrew Yang and art historian David Getsy, Aloi co-organized and chaired the symposium Human-non-Human Networks held at The School of the Art Institute of Chicago on 12 March. The symposium critically addressed the zoocentrism characterizing the recent years of animal studies to identify new and productive methodological approaches and ethicalities for the biotechnological and biocapital dimensions of the Anthropocene.

In 2017, Aloi organized and co-chaired Truth.Climate.Now. Representation, policies, and lived experiences of the Anthropocene were central to this symposium that through the collaboration of artists and scientists working at the School of the Art Institute of Chicago mapped new aesthetic territories for current political times.

Also, in 2017, Aloi organized and chaired the symposium titled Botanical Speculations at The School of the Art Institute of Chicago. The symposium featured the participation of artists, faculties, and students from the School of the Art Institute of Chicago and a keynote presentation by Ikerbasque Research Professor of Philosophy at the University of the Basque Country, Vitoria-Gasteiz, Michael Marder. The proceedings of this symposium were gathered in the edited collection Botanical Speculations published in 2018.

In 2019, Aloi was invited to the Getty Center in LA to moderate a discussion about the presence of animals in contemporary art with artists Kate Clark, Claire Owen, and poet Donika Kelly. The same year, following the symposium by the same name, Aloi launched the Botanical Speculations Discussion Group. A quasi-monthly, online meeting open to the public in which the work of artists focussing on plants is discussed. The series run until 2022.

In 2021, Aloi has organized discussion panels with artists and scholars in conjunction with the exhibition Earthly Observatory he co-curated with Andrew Yang.

In 2022, Aloi was invited to conferences including keynote contributions to events like "Phytogenesis II" organized by the University of Plymouth, UK; Traiettorie di Ricerca Symposium organized by Univesita' di Bologna where he was in conversation with Timothy Morton; Soils Matter Symposium organized by Libera Universita' di Bolzano. The proceedings were gathered in the book Soils Matters. The same year, Aloi gave numerous talks on Lucian Freud's paintings of plants on the occasion of the exhibition "Lucian Freud: Plant Portraits" he curated at the Garden Museum in London.

In 2023 and 2024 Aloi continued to give talks on the subject of art and nature, including appearances at Goldsmiths College in London, Musei Civici Reggio Emilia, Harvard in Cambridge. UNSW School of Art and Design Sydney, Victorian College of the Arts, Melbourne, University of Bankura, India, Museum of Contemporary Art in Montreal, Durbanton Oaks - Washington DC, Universtiry of Copenhagen.

In 2025, Aloi was invited to present at the Thinking with Plants and Fungi symposium organized by Harvard University. Harvard in Cambridge.

== Research and curatorial work ==
Aloi's research focuses on the representation of the natural world in modern and contemporary art with an emphasis on the materiality of art objects, empathy, climate change, extinction, and sustainability. His early career mostly focussed on the field of animal-studies. In 2014, after relocating to Chicago, his research focus shifted to Anthropocene-studies and more recently to critical plant-studies. Another substantial area of interest in Aloi's research is the history of the art market and how economic factors impact art making and art writing.

In 2014, Aloi was invited by Jody Berland, Professor in the Department of Humanities at York University to join an international team of researchers working on the subject of animals and digital interfaces. The project, sponsored by the Social sciences and Humanities Research Council of Canada focuses on "the current proliferation and re-configuration of the animal that occurs in the context of a global visual culture that relies on images of animals to signify, promote, destabilize and secure its political, cultural, and natural landscapes". As part of this project, Aloi co-curated a two-venue exhibition with curator Matthew Brower, of the University of Toronto. The Digital Animalities exhibition took place in Toronto across the exhibiting spaces of Aird Gallery and Contact Gallery. Digital Animalities featured the work of many artists whose practice focuses on the productivities and challenges presented by digital interfaces. Artists included in the exhibition: Julie Andreyev, Simon Lysander Overstall, Jonathon Keats, Gwen MacGregor, Neozoon, Ken Rinaldo, Lou Sheppard, Donna Szoke, Sara Angelucci, Ingrid Bachmann, Maria Fernanda Cardoso, Wally Dion, and Aki Inomata.

Between 2019 and 2021 Aloi has co-curated Earthly Observatory with Andrew Yang. The exhibition brought into dialogue works from local and internationally renowned artists as well as SAIC alumni and faculty and was expressly designed to encourage visitors and students to rethink their conceptions of materiality, agency, empathy, subjectivity, and community at a time of unprecedented ecological crisis and cultural change. The large-scale exhibition included the work of more than 30 artists, including, among others, Edgar Heap of Birds, Nandipha Mntambo, Ken Rinaldo, Mark Dion, and Terry Evans. The exhibition received positive reviews and was listed in Time Out Chicago as a must-see show for Autumn 2021.

The exhibition was chosen by The Times as "critic's pick of the week" and also named one of the "best exhibitions in London" by House & Gardens.

Mentions have appeared in Artists and Illustrators Magazine / A Little Bird / Galerie / Gardens Illustrated / The Arts Society Magazine (5-page commentary on selected paintings by Giovanni Aloi) / The Week / Insider Art / Art Quarterly / RA Magazine / The Daily Telegraph / World of Interiors / The Evening Standard / Harper's Bazaar / The Independent / The New Statesman / The Observer.

Lucian Freud Plant Portraits was reviewed in The Financial Times, The Arts Newspaper, The Spectator, Country Life (in print only), Country Town & Life, and Il Sole 24 Ore (in print only).

In 2025, Aloi curated Materialities for the Driehaus Museum in Chicago. The exhibition was chosen by New City as "top 5 to open in February/March" in Chicago in February/March. Materialities was reviewed in Art Daily, Fox News, Axios, The Observer, Third Coast Review, WBEZ, Chicago Sun Times.

== Interviews ==
Aloi has been interviewed in numerous publications both online and in print. In 2013, he was interviewed by the vegetarian and vegan culture website The Discerning Brute. The Spring 2016 issue of international art magazine Esse opened with "Beyond Zoocentrism: An Interview with Giovanni Aloi". The interview touches on the main issues and opportunities involved in the representation of animals in contemporary art, and openly discusses the limitations of the animal studies academic field. In the same year, Aloi discussed his research turn toward plants in contemporary art with curator Caroline Picard, in an interview for the art and culture website Bad at Sports. Cecilia Novero interviewed Aloi about his 2018 book Speculative Taxidermy for the Philosophy website Aesthetics for Birds. In 2021, Aloi and Andrew S. Yang were interviewed on WLPN 105.5FM about Earthly Observatory, an exhibition they co-curated at the School of the Art Institute of Chicago. More recently, Aloi was interviewed by art historian Robert Enright in Border Crossings issue 159: 'Human/Nature'.

== Publishing ==
=== Books ===
- Art & Animals (2011: IB Tauris)
- Antennae 10: A Decade of Art and the Non-Human (2017: Forlaget 284 and Antennaeproject)
- Speculative Taxidermy: Natural History, Animal Surfaces, and Art in the Anthropocene (2017: Columbia University Press)
- Animal: Exploring the Zoological World -consultant and co author- (2018: Phaidon)
- Botanical Speculations: Plants in Contemporary Art (2018: Cambridge Scholars)
- Why Look at Plants? The Botanical Emergence in Contemporary Art (2018: Brill)
- Lucian Freud Herbarium (2019: Prestel)
- Flower: Exploring the World in Bloom -co-author- (2020: Phaidon)
- Posthumanism in Art and Science: A Reader -co-editor- (2021: Columbia University Press)
- Bird: Exploring the Winged World -co-author- (2021: Phaidon)
- Ocean: Exploring the Marine World -co-author- (2022: Phaidon)
- Vegetal Entwinements in Philosophy and Art: A Reader -co-editor Michael Marder- (2023: MI Press)
- Manuela Infante: Estado Vegetal (Minneapolis: University of Minnesota Press) 2023
- Garden: Exploring the Horticultural World -co-author- (2023: Phaidon)
- Tree: Exploring the Arboreal World -co-author- (2024: Phaidon)
- Botanical Revolutions: How Plants Changed the Course of Art(Los Angeles: Getty) 2024
- Lawn (London: Bloomsbury) 2025
- I'm Not an Artist: Reclaiming Creativity in the Age of Infinite Content (London: Bloomsbury) 2025

=== Journals and editorial ===
Since 2007, Aloi has been the founder and editor in chief of Antennae: The Journal of Nature in Visual Culture.

Antennae: is a peer-reviewed academic journal on the subject of "nature" in contemporary art. The Journal publishes academic texts with interviews, fiction, artist statements, and portfolios.

Between 2008 and 2013, Aloi was London Editor of Whitehot Magazine founded by artist and writer Noah Becker. Aloi has written numerous reviews of shows held in the UK, Italy, and the US between 2008 and 2017.

Since 2016, with curator and writer Caroline Picard, Aloi is co-editor of the University of Minnesota Press series Art after Nature.

Aloi has also published in many academic and non-academic journals, newspapers, and magazines. Most notably, Lo Sguardo: Rivista di Filosofia, Art and Research, Journal of Visual Art Practice, Apollo, Esse,; The Guardian, Flash Art, Art Monthly, and many more.
