= Founding of Rome =

Archaeological evidence and mythical tale for Rome's origins

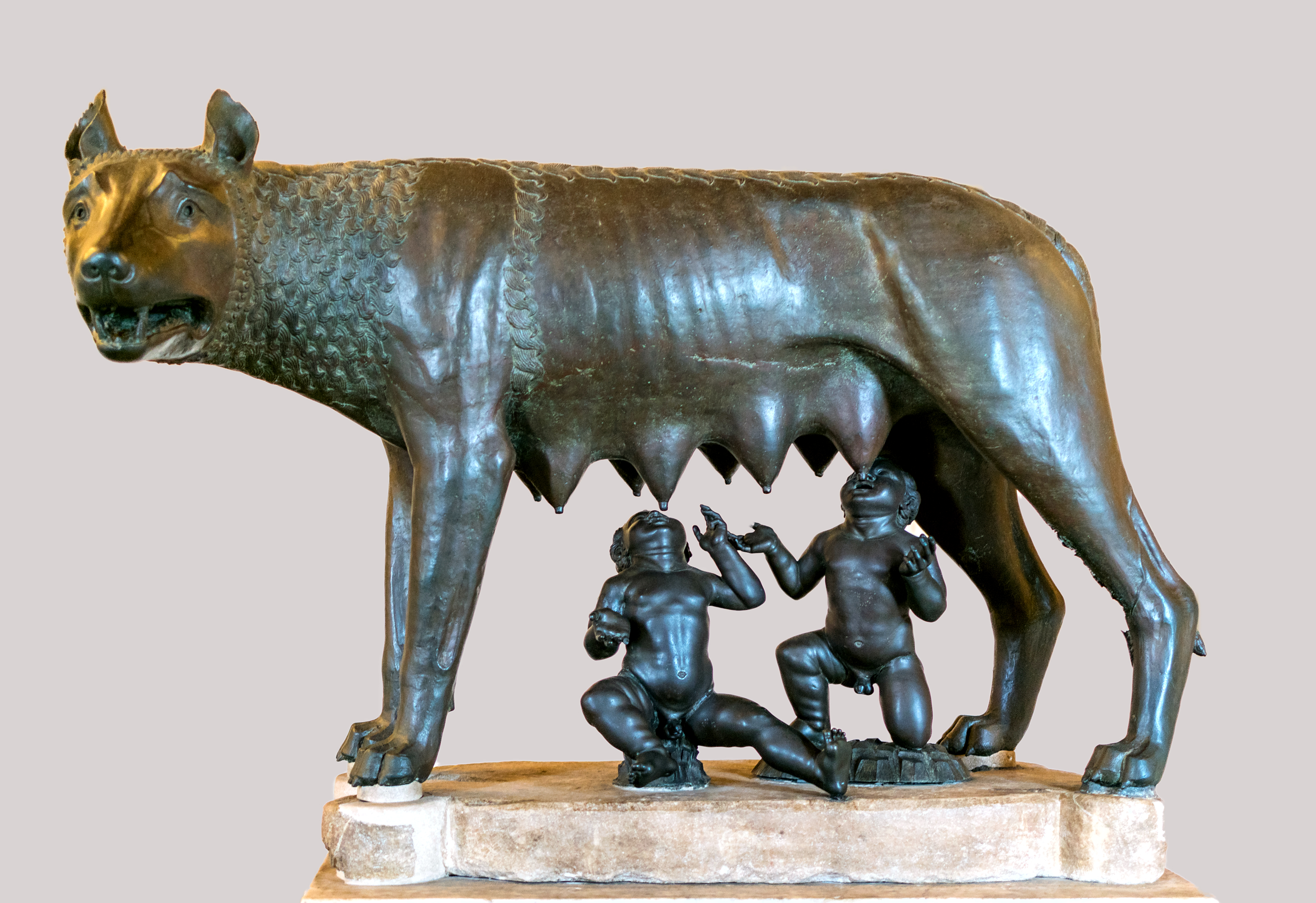
Capitoline Wolf, sculpture of the she-wolf feeding the twins Romulus and Remus, the most famous image associated with the founding of Rome. According to Livy, it was erected in 296 BC.

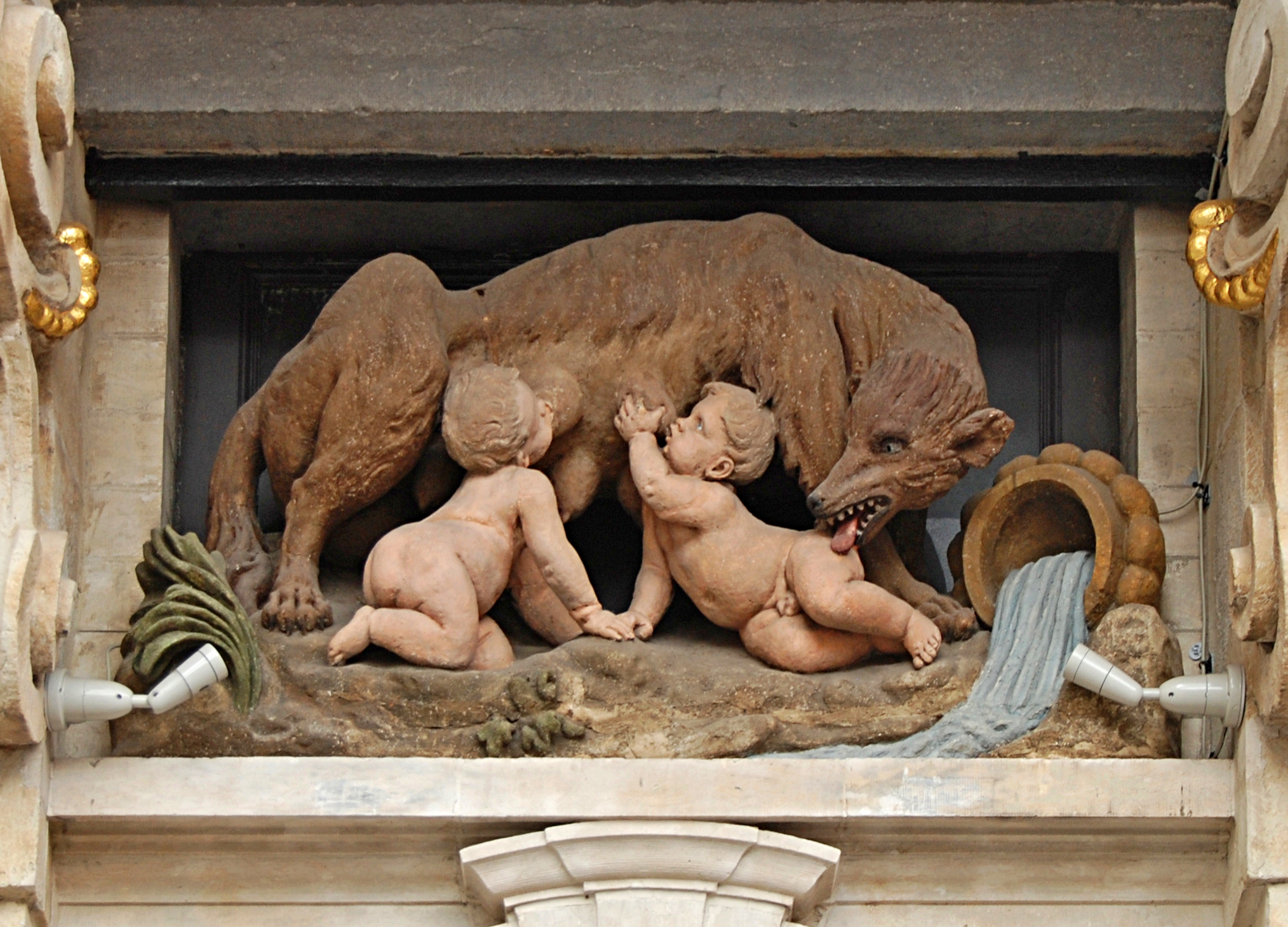
Romulus and Remus on the House of the She-wolf at the Grand Place of Brussels

Archaeological evidence indicates that Rome developed from the gradual union of several hilltop villages during the Final Bronze Age or early Iron Age. Prehistoric habitation of the Italian Peninsula occurred by 48,000 years ago, with the area of Rome being settled by around 1600 BC. Some evidence on the Capitoline Hill possibly dates as early as c. 1700 BC and the nearby valley that later housed the Roman Forum had a developed necropolis by at least 1000 BC. The combination of the hilltop settlements into a single polity by the later 8th century BC was probably influenced by the trend for city-state formation emerging from ancient Greece.

Roman myth held that their city was founded by Romulus, son of the war god Mars and the Vestal virgin Rhea Silvia, fallen princess of Alba Longa and descendant of Aeneas of Troy. Exposed on the Tiber river, Romulus and his twin Remus were suckled by a she-wolf at the Lupercal before being raised by the shepherd Faustulus, taking revenge on their usurping great-uncle Amulius, and restoring Alba Longa to their grandfather Numitor. The brothers then decided to establish a new town but quarrelled over some details, ending with Remus's murder and the establishment of Rome on the Palatine Hill. The year of the supposed founding was variously computed by ancient historians, but the two dates seeming to be officially sanctioned were the Varronian chronology's 753 BC (used by Claudius's Secular Games and Hadrian's Romaea) and the adjacent year of 752 BC (used by the Fasti and the Secular Games of Antoninus Pius and Philip the Arab). Despite known errors in Varro's calculations, it is the 753 BC date that continues to form the basis for most modern calculations of the AUC calendar era.

The legendary account was still much discussed and celebrated in Roman times. The Parilia Festival on 21 April was considered to commemorate the anniversary of the city's founding during the late Republic and that aspect of the holiday grew in importance under the Empire until it was fully transformed into the Romaea in AD 121. Most modern historians dismiss these ancient accounts of a single founder descended from a Trojan lineage establishing the city at a specific point in time as fiction.

== Cultural context ==
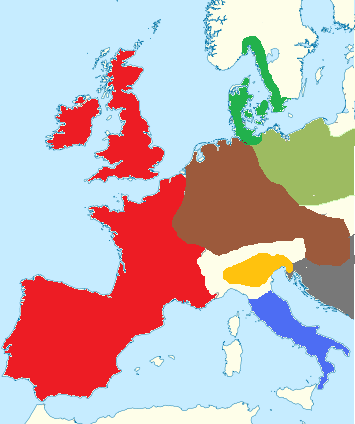
Western Europe during its Middle Bronze Age, with the Apennine Culture in blue

The conventional division of pre-Roman cultures in Italy deals with cultures which spoke Indo-European and non-Indo-European languages. The Italic languages, which include Latin, are Indo-European and were spoken, according to inscriptions, in the lower Tiber Valley. It was once thought that Faliscan – spoken north of Veii on the right bank of the Tiber – was a separate language, but inscriptions discovered in the 1980s indicate that Latin was spoken more generally in the area. Etruscan speakers were concentrated in modern Tuscany with a similar language called Raetic spoken on the upper Adige (the foothills of the eastern Italian Alps).

When drawing a connection between peoples and their languages, a reconstruction emerges with Indo-European peoples arriving in various waves of migrations during the first and second millennia BC: first a western Italic group (including Latin), followed by a central Italic group of Osco-Umbrian dialects, with a late arrival of Greek and Celtic on the Italian peninsula, from across the Adriatic and Alps, respectively. These migrations are generally believed to have displaced speakers of Etruscan and other pre-Indo-European languages; although it is possible that Etruscan arrived also by migration, almost certainly before 2000 BC.

The start of the Iron Age saw a gradual increase in social complexity and population that led to the emergence of proto-urban settlements in central and northern Italy writ large. These proto-urban agglomerations were normally clusters of smaller settlements that were insufficiently distant to be separated communities; over time, they would unify.

== Archaeological evidence ==
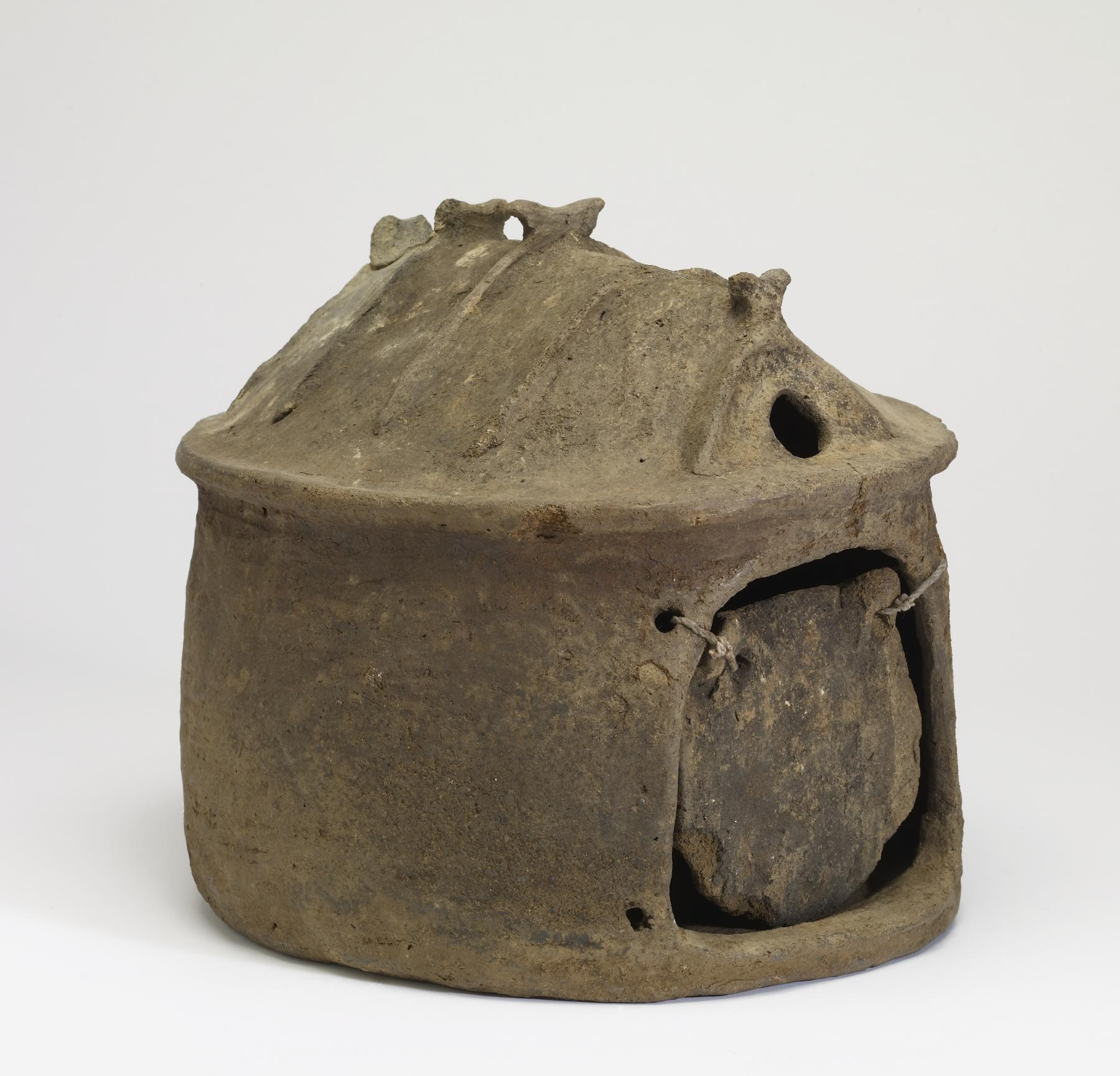
Funerary urn of the Villanovan culture, precursor to Etruscan civilization

There is archaeological evidence of human occupation of the area of modern Rome from at least 5,000 years ago, but the dense layer of much younger debris obscures any Palaeolithic and Neolithic sites. Traces of occupation have been found in the general region – including Lavinium and the coast near Ardea – going back to the 15th century BC. The area was home to the Apennine and Proto-Villanovan cultures before the advent of the more regional Latial culture.

=== Bronze Age ===
Archaeological evidence suggests that Rome developed over a long period, but it was definitely occupied by the middle of the Bronze Age. Core samples have shown that the terrain of Bronze-Age Rome differed greatly from what is present now. The area of the Forum Boarium north of the Aventine Hill was a seasonally dry plain that simultaneously provided a safe inland port for the era's seafaring ships, a wide area for watering horses and cattle, and a safe ford of the Tiber with shallow and slow-flowing water even if Tiber Island had not yet formed, one of the river's major fords between Etruria and Campania. This advantageous but exposed location was closely flanked by the Capitoline, which at that time rose sharply from the more easterly bank of the Tiber and provided a ready citadel for defence and for control of the salt production along the river and at its mouth. The other hills and the marshes between them provided similarly defensible points for settlement.

Accordingly, thick deposits of manure and pottery sherds have been discovered in the Forum Boarium from the middle of the Bronze Age. Current evidence suggests that there were three separate bronze-using settlements on the Capitoline during the period 1700–1350 BC and in the neighbouring valley that later became the Roman Forum from 1350 to 1120 BC. Some 13th century BC structures indicate that the Capitoline was already being terraced to manage its slope. Evidence in the Final Bronze Age around 1200–975 BC is clearer, showing occupation of the Capitoline, Forum, and adjacent Palatine. Excavations near the modern Capitoline Museums suggest the construction of fortifications and some scholars have speculated that settlements also existed on the other hills, especially the Janiculum, Quirinal, and Aventine. The Capitoline currently seems to have been the earliest settled but it is debated whether the settlements on the other hills were independent, colonies of the Capitoline settlement, or formerly separate villages already consolidated into a single polity. By 1000 BC, a necropolis existed in the Forum for cremation graves. By the early Iron Age c. 900 BC, graves started to be placed into the ground. Other cemeteries appear on the Esquiline, Quirinal, and Viminal Hills by the 9th century, containing pottery, imported Greek wares, fibulae, and bronze objects. Remains from huts on the Palatine have been found that date to the 9th or 8th centuries BC, with accelerating development by the early to middle 8th century BC.

The political organisation of these communities is unclear. Scholars have suggested a relatively flat social hierarchy evidenced by the relative uniformity of gravesites and it is unlikely that there was significant social organisation across the hilltop communities. During the Bronze Age, the hilltops would have been more prominent, not having been eroded and settled as they are in modern times. Regular flooding and forests also would have divided the communities from each other. Such conditions would not have been amenable to a centralised political unit. The shift towards a more central sociopolitical structure came with rapid population growth in the hilltop communities during the late 9th century BC, a trend also archaeologically noted in other contemporaneous central Italian towns.

=== Eighth and seventh centuries BC ===
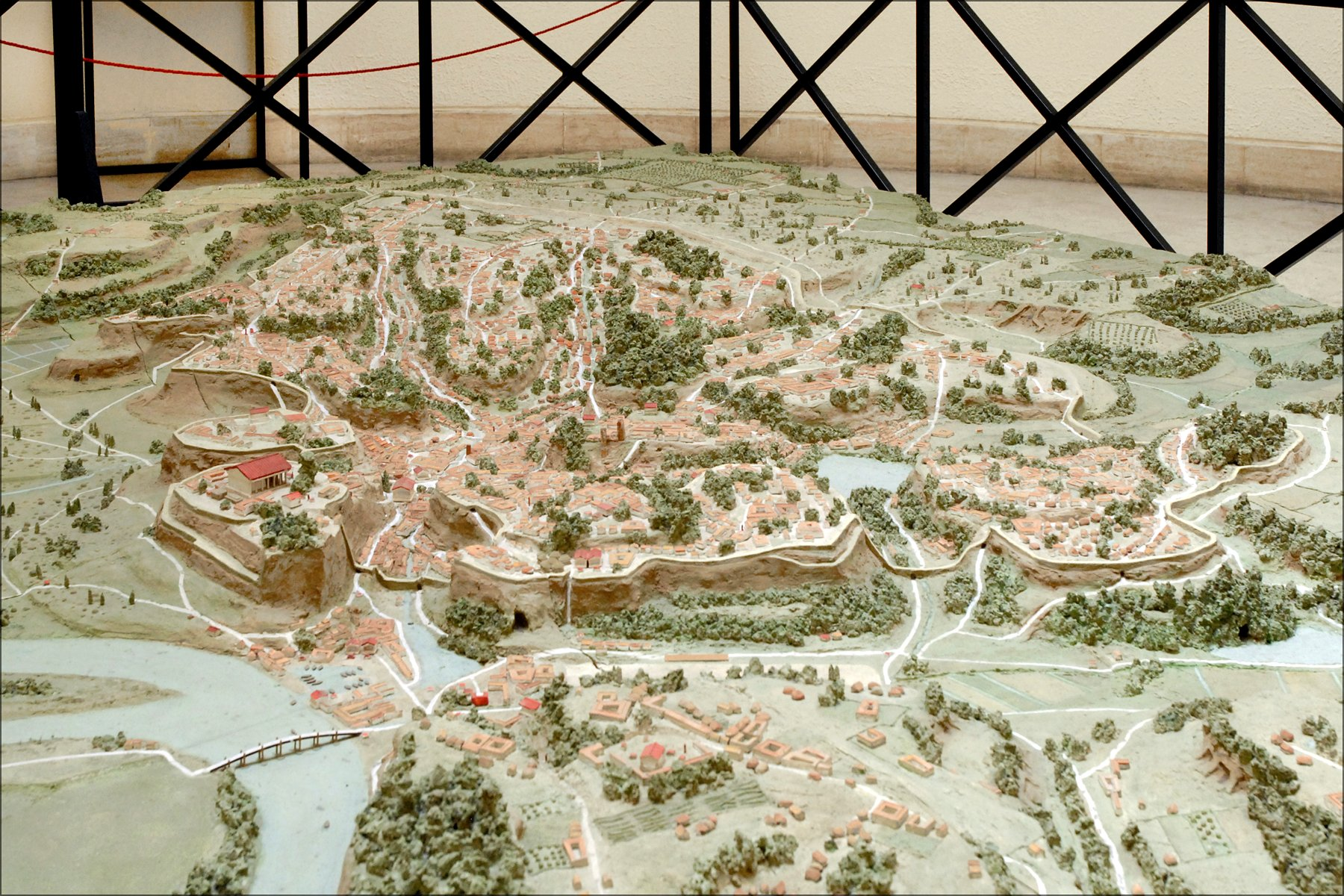
Model of archaic Rome, 6th century BC

By this time, four major settlements emerged in Rome. The nuclei appeared on the Palatine, the Capitoline, the Quirinal and Viminal, and the Caelian, Oppian, and Velia. There is, however, no evidence linking any settlement on the Quirinal hill with the Sabines, as is alleged by some ancient accounts.

The area of the Forum also was converted at this time into a public space. Burials there discontinued and portions of it were paved over. Votive offerings appear in the comitium in the eighth century, indicating a more central religious cult, and other public buildings appear to have been erected around that time. One of those buildings was the domus publica (the official residence of the pontifex maximus), which is now believed to have been constructed between 750 and 700 BC. Religious activity started also in this period on the Capitoline hill, suggesting a connection to the ancient cult of Jupiter Feretrius. Other offerings discovered indicate Rome's connections outside Latium, with imported Greek pottery from Euboea and Corinth.

The first evidence of a wall appears in the middle or late eighth century on the Palatine, dated between 730 and 720 BC. It is possible that the circuit of the wall marked out what later Romans believed to be the original pomerium (sacred boundary) of the city. The discovery of gates and streets connected to the wall, with the remains of various huts, suggest that Rome had by this time:

acquired a defined boundary ... [and] a more sophisticated level of social and political organisation ... the use of the Forum as a public space point[s] to the development of [a] shared civil and ritual space[] for the inhabitants of all communities, demonstrating an increasing level of centralisation.

Like other Villanovan proto-urban centres, this archaic Rome was likely organised around clans that guarded their own areas, but by the later eighth century had confederated. The development of city-states was likely a Greek innovation that spread through the Mediterranean from 850 to 750 BC. The earliest votive deposits are found in the early seventh century on the Capitoline and Quirinal hills, suggesting that by that time a city had formed with monumental architecture and public religious sanctuaries. Certainly, by 600 BC, a process of synoikismos was complete and a unified Rome – reflected in the production of a central forum area, public monumental architecture, and civic structures – had by then been formed.

== Ancient tradition and founding myths ==
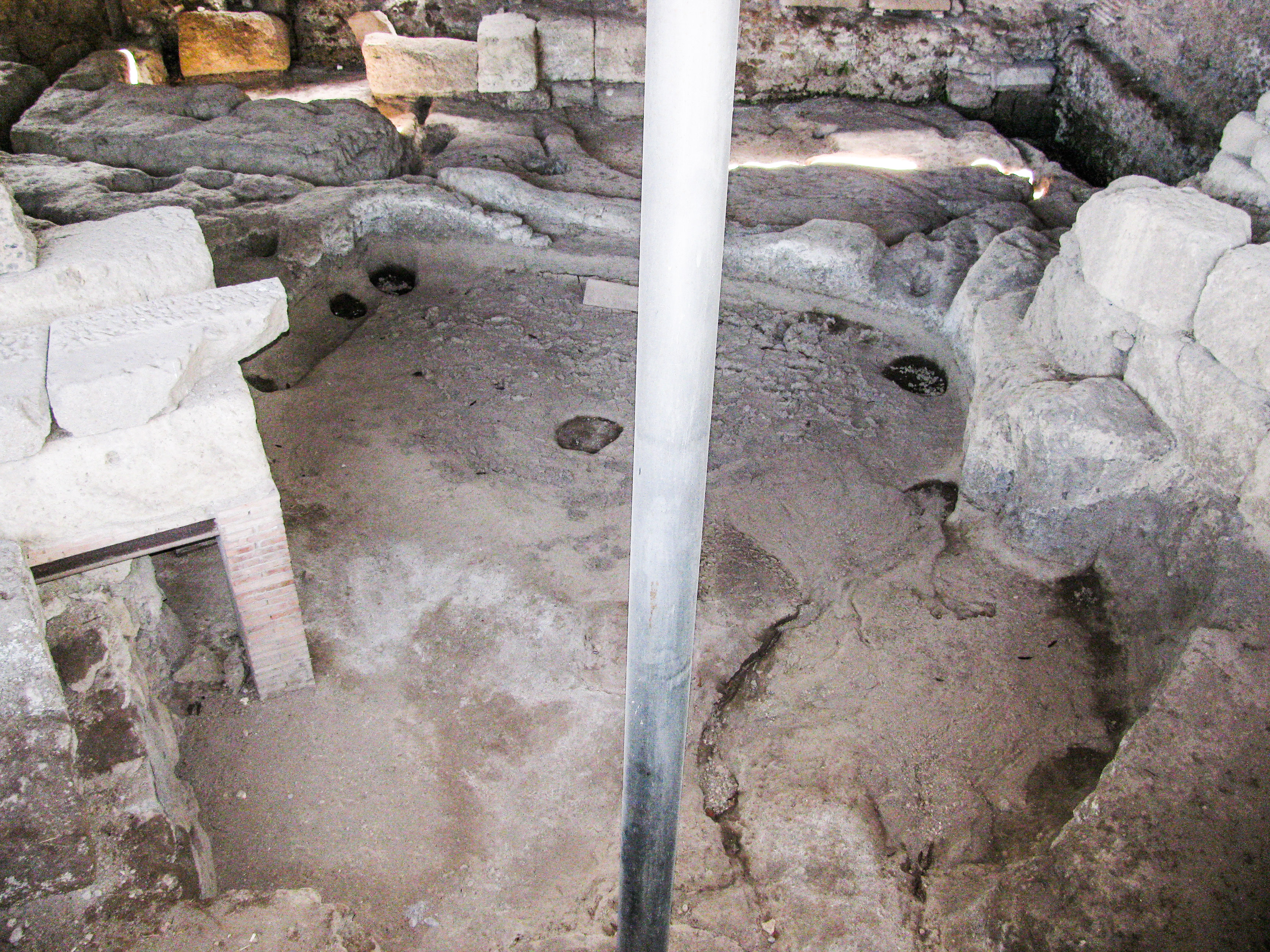
Excavation on the Palatine Hill has found the foundations of a hut believed to correspond to the Hut of Romulus, which the Romans themselves preserved into late antiquity.

By the late Republic, the usual Roman origin myth held that their city was founded by a Latin named Romulus on the day of the Parilia Festival (21 April) in some year around 750 BC. Important aspects of the myth concerned Romulus's murder of his twin Remus, the brothers' descent from the god Mars and the royal family of Alba Longa, and that dynasty's supposed descent from Aeneas, himself supposedly descended from the goddess Aphrodite and the royal family of Troy. The accounts in the first book of Livy's History of Rome and in Vergil's Aeneid were particularly influential. Some accounts further asserted that there had been a Mycenaean Greek settlement on the Palatine (later dubbed Pallantium) even earlier than Romulus and Remus, at some time prior to the Trojan War.

Modern scholars disregard most of the traditional accounts as myths. There is no persuasive archaeological evidence for either the Romulan foundation or for the idea of an early Greek settlement. Even the name Romulus is now generally believed to have been retrojected from the city's name – glossed as "Mr Rome" by the classicist Mary Beard – rather than reflecting a historical or actual figure. Some scholars, particularly Andrea Carandini, have argued that it remains possible that these foundation myths reflect actual historical events in some form and that the city and Roman Kingdom were in fact founded by a single actor in some way. This remains a minority viewpoint in present scholarship and highly controversial in the absence of further evidence, with the arguments made by Carandini and others appearing to rest on highly tendentious interpretations of what is currently known with certainty from scientific excavations.

The Romans' origin myths, however, provide evidence of how the Romans conceived of themselves as a mixture of different ethnic groups and foreign influences, The Romans took the foundation of their own new cities seriously, undertaking many rituals and attributing many of them to remote antiquity. They long maintained the Hut of Romulus, a primitive dwelling on the Palatine attributed to their founder, although they had no firm basis for associating it with him specifically.

=== Chronological disagreements ===
Rome's foundation dates in ancient sources
Ancient historian	Founding year
Gnaeus Naevius	c. 1100 BC
Ennius	c. 1100 or c. 884 BC
Timaeus	814 BC
Asinius Quadratus	776 BC
Calpurnius Piso	757, 753, or 751 BC
Varro and Plutarch	754/53 BC
Fasti Capitolini	752 BC
Dionysius of Halicarnassus	752/51 BC
Cato the Elder and Diodorus	751/50 BC
Polybius	750/49 BC
Fabius Pictor	748/47 BC
Cincius Alimentus	729/28 BC

While the Romans believed that their city had been founded by an eponymous founder at a specific time, when that occurred was disputed by the ancient historians. The earliest dates placed it c. 1100 BC out of a belief that Romulus had been Aeneas's grandson. This moved Rome's foundation much closer to the fall of Troy, dated by Eratosthenes to 1184–83 BC; these dates are attested as early as the 4th century BC. Romulus was later chronologically connected to Aeneas and the time of the Trojan War by introducing a line of Alban kings, which scholars consider to be entirely spurious.

Most scholars view the move from a foundation date in the 1100s to one in the 700s to have come from Roman calculations from estimates of the lengths of the republican and regal periods. Their attempts to estimate how long the regal period lasted, however, are largely rejected as synthetic calculations. It may also be that the date of the city's foundation was assigned from Greek historiography, especially influenced by Timaeus of Tauromenium (born c. 350 BC) who may have been the first to move the founding of the city from the era of the Trojan war to the more historical 814 BC. A later intervention, possibly at the hands of Fabius Pictor (born c. 270 BC) or his source Diocles of Peparethus, then placed the foundation date within the Olympiads (ie within "historical" time), settling eventually on c. 750 BC. Dionysius of Halicarnassus (born c. 60 BC) placed it in the first year of the 7th Olympiad, that is, 752/51 BC.

From Claudius's Secular Games in AD 47 to Hadrian's Romaea in AD 121, the official date seems to have used the chronology established by Varro in the late 1st century BC, placing Rome's founding in 753 BC. Augustus's Fasti running to AD 13 and the Secular Games celebrated at Rome's 900th and 1000th anniversaries under Antoninus Pius and Philip I, meanwhile, used dates computed from a foundation a year later in 752 BC. Despite known errors in Varro's work, it is the former date that has become the most repeated in modernity and is still used for computing the AUC calendar era.

=== Romulus and Remus ===
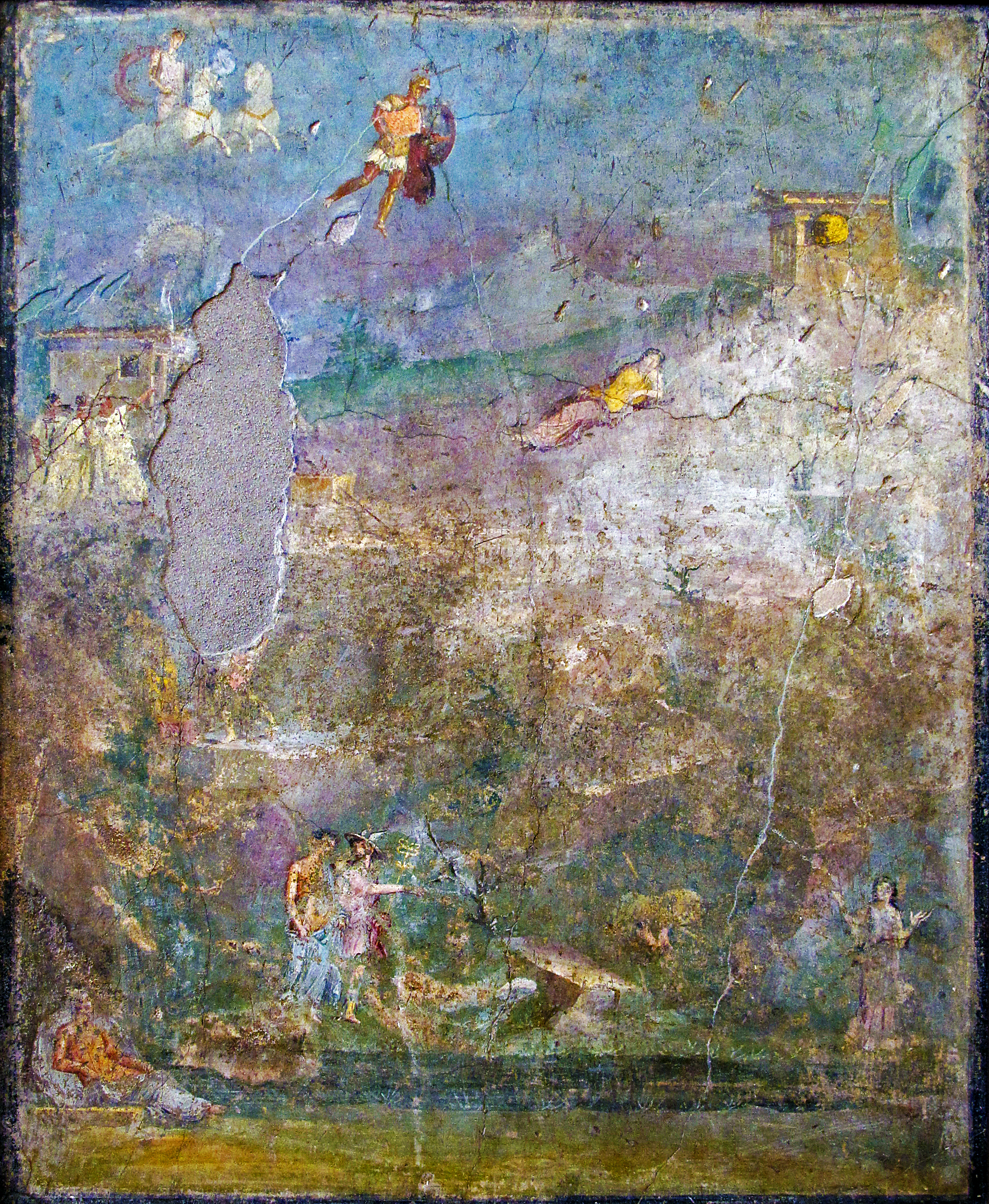
A fresco from Pompeii depicting the foundation of Rome. Sol riding in his chariot; Mars descending from the sky to Rhea Silvia lying in the grass; Mercury shows to Venus the she-wolf suckling the twins; in the lower corners of the picture: river-god Tiberinus and water-goddess Juturna. 35–45 AD.

In the best-known form of the legend, Romulus and Remus are the grandsons of Numitor, the king of Alba Longa. After Numitor is deposed by his brother Amulius, who compels Numitor's daughter Rhea Silvia to become a Vestal virgin, she becomes pregnant – allegedly raped by the war god Mars – and delivers the two illegitimate brothers. Amulius orders that the children be left to die on the slopes of the Palatine or in the Tiber River, but they are suckled by a she-wolf at the Lupercal cave and then discovered by the shepherd Faustulus and taken in by him and his wife Acca Larentia. (Livy combines Larentia and the she-wolf, considering them most likely to have referred to a prostitute, also known in Latin slang as a lupa or she-wolf.) Faustulus eventually reveals the brothers' true origins, and they depose or murder Amulius and restore Numitor to his throne. They then leave or are sent to establish a new city at the location where they had been rescued.

The twins then come into conflict during the foundation of the city, leading to the murder of Remus. The dispute is variously said to have been over the naming of the new city, over the interpretation of auguries, whether to place it on the Palatine or Aventine Hill, or concerned with Remus's disrespect of the new town's ritual furrow or wall. Some accounts say Romulus slays his brother with his own hand, others that Remus (and sometimes Faustulus) are killed in a general mêlée. Wiseman and some others attribute the aspects of fratricide to the 4th-century BC Conflict of the Orders, when Rome's lower-class plebeians began to resist excesses by the upper-class patricians.

Romulus, after ritualistically ploughing the generally square course of the city's future boundary, erects its first walls and declares the settlement an asylum for exiles, criminals, and runaway slaves. The city becomes larger but also acquires a mostly male population. When Romulus' attempts to secure the women of neighbouring settlements by diplomacy fail, he uses the religious celebration of Consualia to abduct the women of the Sabines. According to Livy, when the Sabines rally an army to take their women back, the women force the two groups to make peace and to install the Sabine king Titus Tatius as co-monarch with Romulus.

Some modern scholars theorise that the story of Ruimulus may reflect anti-Roman propaganda from the late-fourth century BC, but it more likely echoes an indigenous Roman tradition, given the Capitoline Wolf which likely dates to the sixth century BC. Regardless, by the third century BC, Romans generally accepted the legend and depicted it on some of Rome's first silver coins in 269 BC. In his 1995 Beginnings of Rome, Tim Cornell argues that the myths of Romulus and Remus are "popular expressions of some universal human need or experience" rather than borrowings from the Greek east or Mesopotamia, inasmuch as stories of a virgin birth, intercession by animals and humble stepparents, with a triumphant return expelling an evil leader are common mythological elements across Eurasia and even into the Americas.

=== Aeneas ===
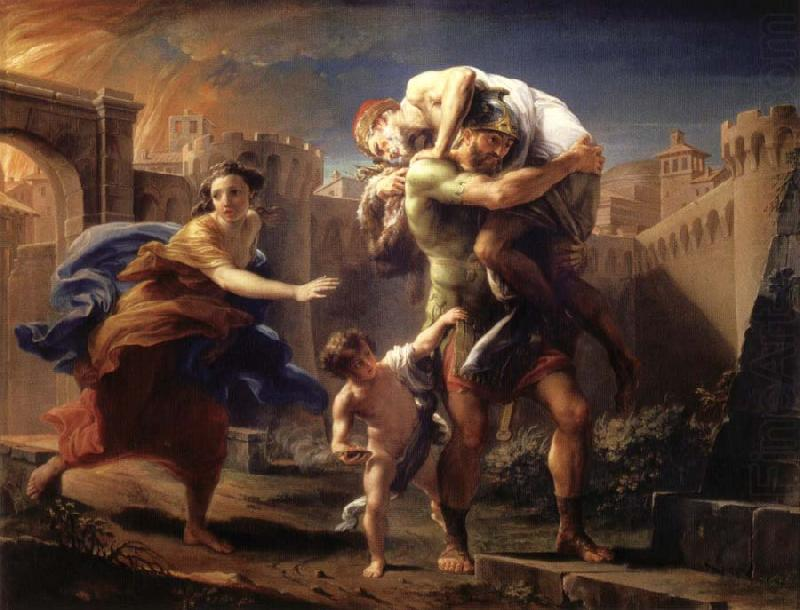
Eighteenth-century painting by Pompeo Batoni depicting Aeneas fleeing from Troy. Aeneas carries his father.

Aeneas's route in Virgil's Aeneid. The epic poem was written in the early first century BC.

The tradition of Romulus was also combined with a legend telling of Aeneas coming from Troy and travelling to Italy. This tradition emerges from the Iliad's prophecy that Aeneas's descendants would one day return and rule Troy once more. Greeks by 550 BC had begun to speculate, given the lack of any clear descendants of Aeneas, that the figure had established a dynasty outside the proper Greek world. The first attempts to tie this story to Rome were in the works of two Greek historians at the end of the fifth century BC, Hellanicus of Lesbos and Damastes of Sigeum, likely only mentioning off hand the possibility of a Roman connection; a more assured connection only emerged at the end of the fourth century BC when Rome started having formal dealings with the Greek world.

The ancient Roman annalists, historians, and antiquarians faced an issue tying Aeneas to Romulus, as they believed that Romulus lived centuries after the Trojan War, which was dated at the time c. 1100 BC. For this, they fabricated a story of Aeneas's son founding the city of Alba Longa and establishing a dynasty there, which eventually produced Romulus.

In Livy's first book he recounts how Aeneas, a demigod of the Trojan royal Anchises and the goddess Venus, leaves Troy after its destruction during the Trojan War and sailed to the western Mediterranean. He brings his son – Ascanius – and a group of companions. Landing in Italy, he forms an alliance with a local magnate called Latinus and marries his daughter Lavinia, joining the two into a new group called the Latini; they then found a new city, called Lavinium. After a series of wars against the Rutuli and Caere, the Latins conquer the Alban Hills and its environs. His son Ascanius then founds the legendary city of Alba Longa, which became the dominant city in the region. The later descendants of the royal lineage of Alba Longa eventually produce Romulus and Remus, setting up the events of their mythological story.

Dionysius of Halicarnassus similarly attempted to show a Greek connection, giving a similar story for Aeneas, but also a previous series of migrations. He describes migrations of Arcadians into southern Italy some time in the 18th century BC, migrations into Umbria by Greeks from Thessaly, and the foundation of a settlement on the Palatine Hill by Evander (originally hailing also from Arcadia) and Hercules, whose labour with the cattle of Geryon was placed in the Forum Boarium by the Romans.

Strabo also mentions an ancient myth linking the foundation of Rome to Arcadia and Evander. According to this tradition, Rome was an Arcadian colony founded by Evander. When Evander welcomed Hercules, he followed a prophecy from his mother Nicostrata and honored him as a future god by establishing a sacred grove and offering Greek-style sacrifices. The Greek-style sacrifices was continued by the Romans and led the historian Coelius to argue that Rome had Greek origins. The Romans also worshipped Evander's mother as the nymph Carmentis.

The introduction of Aeneas follows a trend across Italy towards Hellenising their own early mythologies by rationalising myths and legends of the Greek Heroic Age into a pseudo-historical tradition of prehistoric times; this was in part due to Greek historians' eagerness to construct narratives purporting that the Italians were actually descended from Greeks and their heroes. These narratives were accepted by non-Greek peoples due Greek historiography's prestige and claims to systematic validity.

Archaeological evidence shows that worship of Aeneas had been established at Lavinium by the sixth century BC. Similarly, a cult to Hercules had been established at the Ara Maxima in Rome during the archaic period. By the early fifth century BC, these stories had become entrenched in Roman historical beliefs. These cults, along with the early – in literary terms – account of Cato the Elder, show how Italians and Romans took these Greek histories seriously and as reliable evidence by later annalists, even though they were speculations of little value. Much of the syncretism, however, may simply reflect Roman desires to give themselves a prestigious backstory: claim of Trojan descent proved politically advantageous with the Greeks by justifying both claims of common heritage and ancestral enmity.

=== Other myths ===
There was no single mythic tradition of Rome's founding. By the time of the Pyrrhic War (280–275 BC), there were some sixty different myths for Rome's foundation that circulated in the Greek world. Most of them attributed the city to an eponymous founder, usually "Rhomos" or "Rhome" rather than Romulus. One story told how Romos, a son of Odysseus and Circe, was the one who founded Rome. Martin P. Nilsson speculates that this older story was becoming a bit embarrassing as Rome became more powerful and tensions with the Greeks grew. Being descendants of the Greeks was no longer preferable, so the Romans settled on the Trojan foundation myth instead. Nilsson further speculates that the name of Romos was changed by some Romans to the native name Romulus, but the same name Romos (later changed to the native Remus) was never forgotten by many of the people, so both these names were used to represent the founders of the city.

Another story, attributed to Hellanicus of Lesbos by Dionysius of Halicarnassus, says that Rome was founded by a woman named Rhome, one of the followers of Aeneas, after landing in Italy and burning their ships. That by the middle of the fifth century Aeneas was also allegedly the founder of two or three other cities across Italy was no object. These myths also differed as to whether their eponymous matriarch Roma was born in Troy or Italy – i.e. before or after Aeneas's journey – or otherwise if their Romus was a direct or collateral descendant of Aeneas.

Myths of the early third century also differed greatly in the claimed genealogy of Romulus or the founder, if an intermediate actor was posited. One tale posited that a Romus, son of Zeus, founded the city. Callias posited that Romulus was descended from Latinus and a woman called Roma who was the daughter of Aeneas and a homonymous mother. Other authors depicted Romulus and Romus, as a son of Aeneas, founding not only Rome but also Capua. Authors also wrote their home regions into the story. Polybius, who hailed from Arcadia, for example, gave Rome not a Trojan colonial origin but rather an Arcadian one.

== See also ==
- Natale di Roma, a modern festival commemorating the founding of the city
