= Sherman Chaddlesone =

Native American painter from Oklahoma (1947–2013

- Born: June 2, 1947; Lawton, OK
- Died: August 17, 2013 (aged 66); Anadarko, OK
- Citizenship: Kiowa Tribe and American
- Education: Institute of American Indian Arts, Central State University
- Known for: muralist, sculptor, and painter
- Spouse: Allie Chaddlesone
- Website: https://web.archive.org/web/20150413080230/http://chaddlesone.webs.com/

Sherman Terrance Chaddlesone (2 June 1947 – 17 August 2013) was a Kiowa Indian painter from Anadarko, Oklahoma, who played a pivotal role in late 20th century Native American art.

== Background ==
Chaddlesone was born in Lawton, Oklahoma, son of John Wesley and Alice Toppah (Yellowhair) Chaddlesone. He grew up in the Wichita Mountains area, around Saddle Mountain, Oklahoma. He was a direct descendant of the great Kiowa war chief Satanta, also known as White Bear.

== Education ==
Chaddlesone attended Eisenhower High School in Lawton, Oklahoma and the Institute of American Indian and Alaska Native Culture and Arts (IAIA) in Santa Fe, New Mexico. While at the institute, Chaddlesone took classes with notable figures such as Allan Houser and Fritz Scholder. He also attended Central State University (now University of Central Oklahoma) in Edmond, Oklahoma, where he undertook post-graduate work. While studying at the Institute of American Indian Arts, Chaddlesone met his wife, Allie.

== Military service ==
Chaddlesone was a veteran of the Vietnam War.

== Career ==
Chaddlesone had a number of occupations before taking up painting and sculpturing full-time after 1982. He worked in watercolor, acrylics, oils, and pastels. He also sculpted in stone and bronze.

He was commissioned to paint a mural in the Kiowa Tribal Complex in Carnegie, Oklahoma.

Chaddlesone exhibited his artwork nationally and internationally. He and his wife Allie exhibited their work at the Center of the American Indian.

== Death ==
Chaddlesone died on August 17, 2013, at home in Anadarko, Oklahoma, after a short illness.

== Honors and legacy ==
Chaddlesone's piece Phantom Warriors is the logo for The New Plains Review Publishing Centre at the University of Central Oklahoma, his alma mater. The university also honors Chaddlesone with the Sherman Chaddlesone Arts & Letters Lecture Series, which is held every Indigenous People's Day. Joy Harjo and D.G. Smalling have been among the series' guests speakers.
