= Center of the American Indian =

- Established: 1978
- Dissolved: 1992
- Location: Oklahoma City, Oklahoma
- Coordinates: 35.5236°N 97.4751°W
- Type: cultural museum
- Executive director: Mary Jo Watson (1984–88)
- Chairperson: Allie Reynolds (1984)

The Center of the American Indian (CAI) was an intertribal, Native American-led museum in Oklahoma City, Oklahoma. It was housed in the second floor of the Kirkpatrick Center.

The Center of the American Indian produced a quarterly journal, The Storyteller. The CAI held workshops, language classes, and symposia, such as "We Always Had Plenty: Native Americans and the Bison" held in 1989.

CAI helped launch the Red Earth Festival in 1987. In 1992, the Center of the American Indian merged into Red Earth Inc., marking the end of its Native American leadership.

== Personnel and supporters ==
Mary Jo Watson (Seminole) served as director of the museum from 1984 to 1988. Baseball legend Allie Reynolds (Muscogee, 1917–1994) served as board chairman. Artists Benjamin Harjo Jr. (Absentee Shawnee/Seminole, 1945–2023) and Sharron Ahtone Harjo (Kiowa) volunteered at the museum and served on the board. Collector Arthur Silberman advised the museum.

Volunteers formed the Friends of the center. Gallerist and dealer Imogene Mugg helped organize exhibition receptions.

== Selection exhibitions and publications ==
In 1990, the museum created a permanent exhibition Moving History: Native American Dance. Artists Sherman Chaddlesone (Kiowa, 1947–2014) and Allie Chaddlesone (Kutenai) exhibited at CAI.

Changing exhibitions, included:

- Kachin-Tihus: Those Who Sit with the People (1991) with catalog
- Moving History: Evolution of the Powwow (1991) with catalog by Dennis Zotigh (Kiowa)
- Songs of Indian Territory: Native American Music Traditions (1989) with catalog and cassette tape by Willie Smyth
- Mothers and Descendants (1987), group exhibition of women artists, including Shan Goshorn (Eastern Band Cherokee, 1957–2018), and their children, guest-curated by Mary Lou Davis (Caddo/Cherokee)
- Children of Early America (1987) with catalog by Daniel C. Swan
- Big War/Little War: Oklahoma Indians in the Civil War, 1861–1865 (1985), with catalog
- Making Medicine: Ledger Drawing Art from Fort Marion (1984) with catalog, celebrating the ledger art of St. David Pendleton Oakerhater (Southern Cheyenne, c. 1847–1931).
- Full Blooded (1984), solo exhibition of work by Edgar Heap of Birds (Southern Cheyenne)
