= Neozoon (artist collective) =

Artist collective

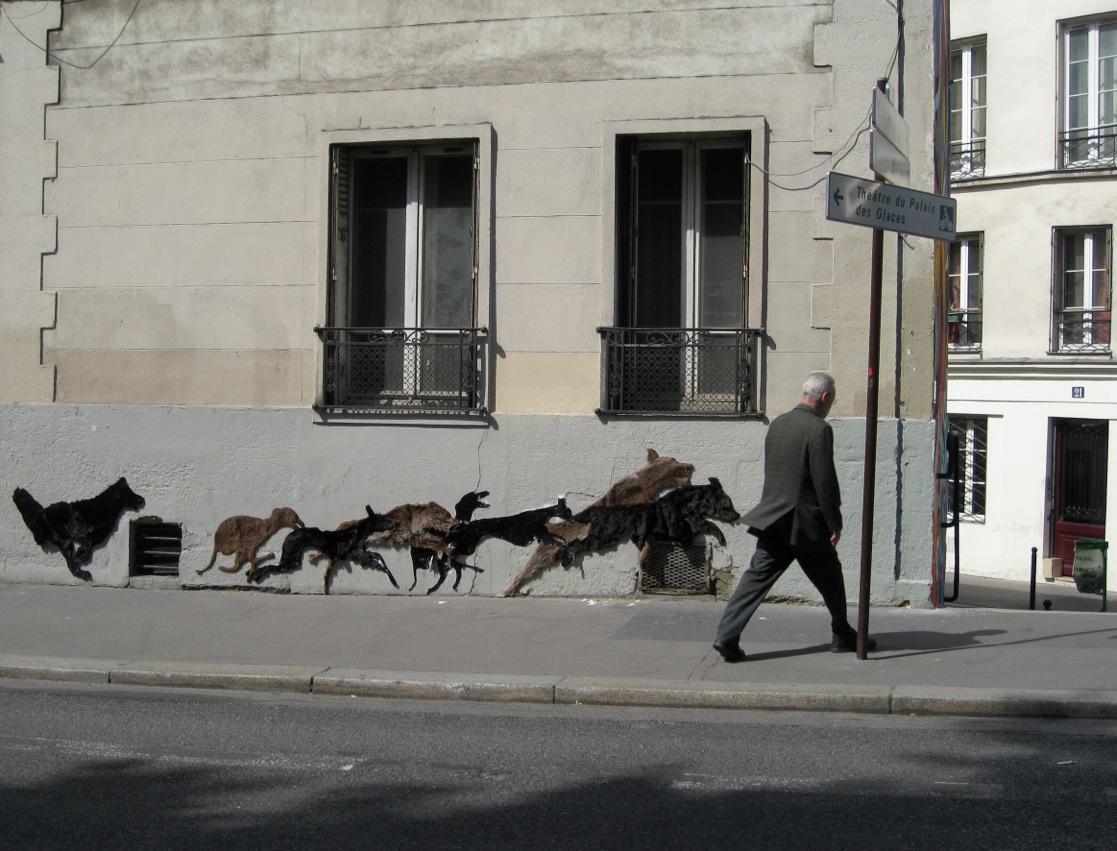
Part of the Fur Coat Recycling series, Paris (2010)

Neozoon (stylized as NEOZOON) is an anonymous, all-female vegan artist collective. Formed in 2009, the collective's work addresses human–animal relationships. Neozoon's works include the use of upcycled fur coats, as a way to criticize the fur industry, and short film collages exploring the use of animals in human culture. The collective is based in Berlin and Paris.

== History ==
Neozoon was founded in 2009 in Berlin and Paris. The word "neozoon" refers to an introduced species that often causes ecological damage; the group chose their name based on their public art installations, which, in the group's early days, were often illegal. The collective has also used the word "neozoon" to refer to the artworks they put up in public spaces.

Neozoon have cited The Sexual Politics of Meat by Carol J. Adams and the works of Donna Harroway as influences on their work.

== Artworks ==
=== Fur Coat Recycling ===
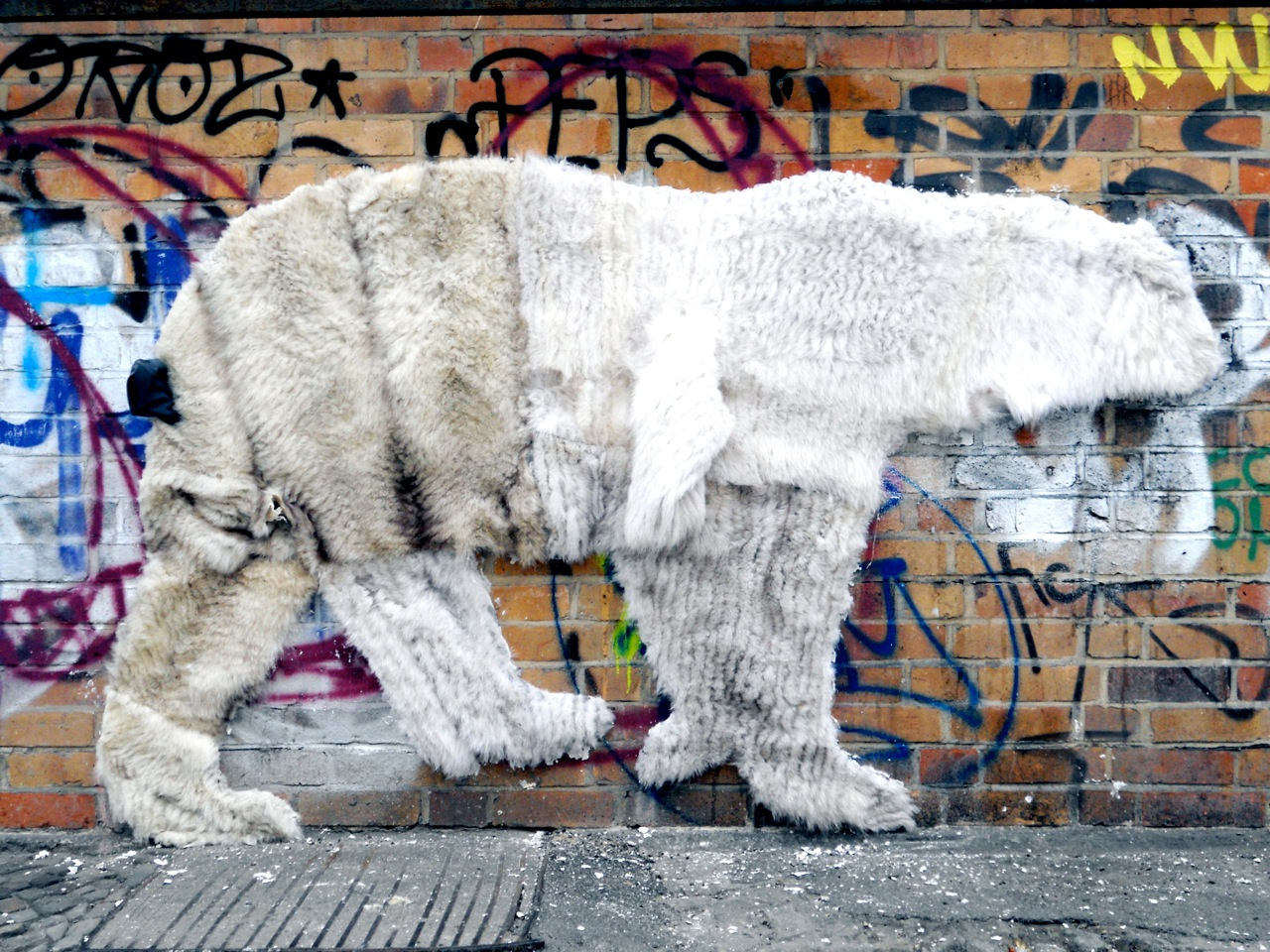
Knut (2011), Berlin

Neozoon's first artwork was Fur Coat Recycling (2009–2012), a series of pop-up exhibitions in which "neozoons", animal silhouettes made from cut-up fur coats, were plastered onto buildings in major European cities. The choice of animal depended on location; for example, coats cut in the shapes of lambs were put up by a Parisian slaughterhouse. Spanish Riding School (2011), installed in Vienna, criticized the practice of dressage by depicting horses throwing and stomping their riders, while Knut (2011) was installed in Berlin shortly after the death of the eponymous captive polar bear. The illegal nature of the installation was what prompted the group to be anonymous, so as to avoid arrest.

In 2010, the Münster and Magdeburg Zoos hosted Neozoon installations in which cages were populated with a fictional species called the “non-toed fur coatie”. The cages contained moving machinery wrapped in fur coats to simulate animals moving. The collective filmed the confused reactions of zoo visitors and made it into a short film called “Das Manteltier”, which would be the first of many films made by Neozoon.

Neozoon obtained the coats for free, as they were to be discarded. The collective added that the purpose was to “reintroduce [the coats] to the environment by returning them to their former shape, making it “live,” to let people perceive [that] this used to be a living animal [...] it also adds something wild to our civilized urban surrounding.”

=== Films ===
Neozoon's first film was Das Manteltier (2010), a video recording of their "non-toed fur coatie" installation at the Münster Zoo, in which recorded the confused reactions of zoo visitors. Neozoon's later films, however, consist of found footage sourced from YouTube videos of humans interacting with animals. The collective describe their found footage work as "[our] way of dealing with the strange behaviours we see in our society, to uncover something [for others] by shifting the context and pointing out what doesn’t work," and have compared finding sources on YouTube to doing sociological studies.

Good Boy–Bad Boy (2011) was the collective's first found-footage short, consisting of clips in which dogs are made to do "demeaning" tricks, culminating in a montage of owners shaming their dogs. Neozoon claimed that their goal was to "emphasize the strange ambivalence between the dogs and their owners when something supposedly serious becomes a spectacle for the camera." Other found-footage films from Neozoon include MY BBY 8L3W (2014), consisting of young women talking about their pets, and Love Goes Through the Stomac (2017), consisting of clips from ASMR videos, mukbangs, and fetish content.

Much of Neozoon's found-footage shorts include the use of repetition and grouping of similar scenes. For example, MY BBY 8L3W groups together clips of women using the same phrases, such as "fur baby", to talk about their pets, and ends with a montage of human–animal breastfeeding, creating an "unsettling" effect. The short "Unboxing Eden", consisting of men unboxing pet snakes, repeats scenes of owners saying "she's pretty feisty" as the snakes hiss or strike, "cut together to show the imbalance of power between the animals and their captors."

=== Other works ===
The 2017 series Carré was made with appropriated Hermès scarves, onto which images of big game hunters and fishermen are imprinted. NEOZOON chose the material because it is a luxury item made from silk, an animal product, and because the scarves "represent idealized worlds – so we merely add a piece of reality to complete these pictures."

== Themes ==
Ecofeminism and the parallels between women's rights and animal rights are major themes throughout Neozoon's work. In an analysis of the book Global Activism: Art and Conflict in the 21st Century, University of Tasmania lecturer Yvette Watt found that out of the over 120 protest art projects featured in the book, the works of Neozoon were the only ones to explicitly advocate for animal rights.

Neozoon's Last Things Trilogy consists of three short films (Little Lower than the Angels, Biting the Dust, and Lake of Fire) critical of evangelical Christianity and its depiction of animals; the short "Lake Of Fire" also criticizes the evangelical stance on climate change.

== Reception ==
Complex praised Fur Coat Recycling in 2012, saying that the use of fur “makes for fantastic texture on the walls” and creates “fabulous juxtaposition”. Bryan Farrell of Waging Nonviolence called the series “refreshing”, compared to other animal rights activists whom he felt were “undermining the moral justness of their cause with actions that are morally dubious in their own right.” In an interview with the Wooster Collective, Neozoon claimed that most of the attention they received from Fur Coat Recycling was positive, but that some people were disgusted to see them putting the artwork up.

In 2017, Giovanni Aloi, while interviewing Neozoon, noted that a colleague viewed the short "MY BBY 8L3W" as misogynistic towards young women, even after he informed her that it was made by an all-female collective. Neozoon acknowledged that the film could be seen as stereotypical, but stated that they focused on women in the short because they could not find similar material featuring men. In the same interview, Neozoon noted that they received negative comments regarding their use of footage, but that they ignored it until "it developed a new meaning for us", adding that "we received so much hate, malice, and fake news as of late."

== Works ==
=== Filmography ===
- "Das Manteltier" (2010)
- "Fair Game" (2011)
- "Good Boy-Bad Boy" (2011)
- "Buck Fever" (2012)
- "Unboxing Eden" (2012)
- "Big Game" (2013)
- "MY BBY 8L3W" (2014)
- "Shake Shake Shake" (2016)
- "Call of the Wild" (2016)
- "Love Goes Through The Stomach" (2017)
- "Little Lower Than The Angels" (2019)
- "Fragments" (2019)
- "Biting the Dust" (2021)
- "Lake of Fire" (2022)
- "Juggernaut" (2025)

=== Installations ===
- Fur Coat Recycling series (2009–2012), various sites, Berlin, Paris, Vienna
- Bestia Recretia (2009), Nogallery, Berlin
- Best In Breed (2011), Kunstverein Wolfsburg, Wolfsburg
