= Mary Jo Watson =

American art historian

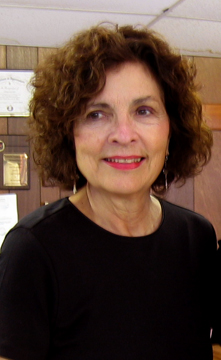
- Mary Jo Watson, Seminole art historian, director emeritus and Regents Professor at University of Oklahoma School of Art and Art History
- Born: Seminole, Oklahoma, US
- Citizenship: Seminole Nation of Oklahoma and United States
- Education: University of Oklahoma
- Occupations: art historian, educator
- Known for: founding the Native American art history program at the University of Oklahoma
- Website: ou.academia.edu/MaryJoWatson

Mary Jo Watson is a Seminole art historian and director emeritus and a regents professor at the School of Art and Art History at the University of Oklahoma. Her work focuses on the theory and development of teaching methodology for Native American art.

== Education and background ==
An enrolled member of the Seminole Nation of Oklahoma, Mary Jo Watson was born in Seminole, Oklahoma, and graduated from Seminole High School. She earned her bachelor's degree in art history 1974, her master of liberal studies degree in Seminole Aesthetics in 1979, and an interdisciplinary doctoral degree in Native American art history in 1993 from the University of Oklahoma.

== Career ==
Watson taught for three years at Seminole Junior College and one year at the Bishop McGuiness High School.

Beginning in 1978, Watson curated exhibitions at the Center of the American Indian in Oklahoma City, Oklahoma. She served as the museum's director from 1984 to 1988.

OU offered no courses in Native American art when Watson was a student, so she began teaching the subject in the 1970s and offered the first formal course in 1980.

In 1993, Watson became a full-time faculty member in the OU School of Art and Art History in 1993. Starting in 1994, she developed a series of undergraduate and graduate courses on Native American art, including the course, American Indian Women Artists.

In 2002, she became an associate dean, and in 2008, a regent's professor. She became the school's director from 2006 through 2013 and developed OU's Native American art history doctoral degree program.

She has also served as the curator of Native American art at OU's Fred Jones Jr. Museum of Art.

== Awards and honors ==
Watson won a Governor's Art Award for service and another for education. The Paseo Art Association gave her its Lifetime Achievement Award in 2010. She has judged in the Santa Fe Indian Market. Watson has earned two grants from the National Science Foundation and one grant from the National Endowment of the Arts.

In 2014, the Oklahoma Higher Education Heritage Society inducted Watson into their Hall of Fame. In 2019, the Oklahoma Historical Society inducted her into the Oklahoma Historians Hall of Fame.

Her former students and colleagues created the Mvhayv Award, a scholarship at the University of Oklahoma in her honor.
