= Red Earth Festival =

Annual Native American cultural festival in Oklahoma City, United States

Coordinates: 35.4686°N 97.5132°W

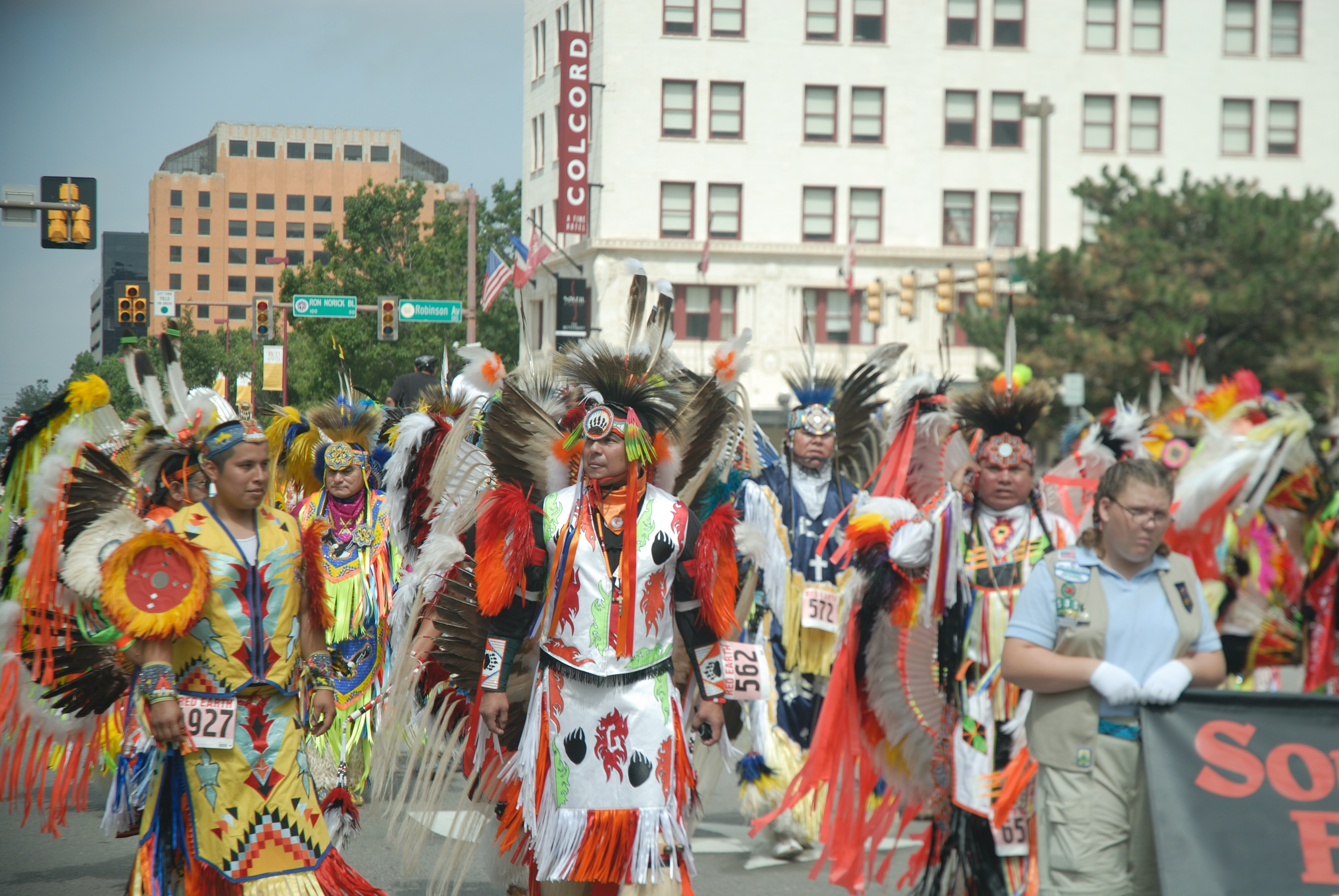
Southern Fancy Dancers in the Red Earth Parade at the 2008 Red Earth Festival.

The Red Earth Festival is a Native American cultural festival that takes places every June in Oklahoma City, Oklahoma, United States. Red Earth, Inc. is the nonprofit organization that hosts the festival and maintained the Red Earth Art Center, which houses temporary exhibits and a permanent collection of Native American art in downtown Oklahoma City.

== History ==
The Red Festival was launched in 1987. when art advocates planned a Native art market and powwow. The organization grew out of the Native-run Center of the American Indian, a cultural center and art museum founded in 1978. The two groups merged in 1992 to create Red Earth.

== Festival ==
The festival is a multi-day event typically held the first weekend of June although occasionally it has been moved to other months such as the 2022 Festival (July) and the 2024 Festival (March). The festival features an art market open to Native American members of federally and state-recognized tribes. The festival also features nonprofit and educational booths, demonstrations, and a dance showcase. The event is held at the Grand Casino Hotel Resort, east of downtown Shawnee, Oklahoma.

An estimated 27,000 people attended in 2010.
