= D.G. Smalling =

D. G. Smalling
- Born: June 13, 1975 (age 50); Waxahachie, Texas, US
- Citizenship: Choctaw Nation of Oklahoma
- Education: University of Oklahoma
- Known for: Single Line Art
- Website: https://dgsmalling.ai/

D.G. Smalling is an American artist recognized for his contributions to Native American contemporary art. He is best known for his unique one-line drawing technique, in which his pen never leaves the paper until the image is complete. Smalling is a citizen of the Choctaw Nation of Oklahoma and incorporates his heritage into his minimalistic artistic style.

== Early life ==
Smalling grew up in a small rural community in Oklahoma. He also spent time living in Switzerland, Cameroon, and South Africa, and this exposure to diverse cultures influenced him both politically and artistically.

I left the United States and went to Switzerland and went to a Commonwealth school... we had art every day. We had poetry every day. I was in third or fourth grade and immediately learning how to memorize Robert Frost, and painting and sculpting. It was incredible. I think that year was the most pivotal year of my life.

== Education ==
Following his graduation from high school in South Africa, Smalling returned to Oklahoma to attend the University of Oklahoma, where he earned a degree in political science.

== Artistic Technique and Philosophy ==
Smalling employs a distinctive technique in which each piece, regardless of its scale, is created with a single continuous line. His approach reflects his Choctaw heritage, which traditionally embraces minimalism, and he considers his modern materials as an extension of this cultural tradition.

Smalling's philosophy, encapsulated by the phrase "think thoroughly, mark once," emphasizes precision and intentionality in his art. He avoids dark, cynical, or macabre themes, focusing instead on aspirational ideals and virtues.

People have forgotten to celebrate that which is beautiful, simple, and innocent. Beauty matters. The job of an artist is to inspire and that's what I want to do.

== Notable Works and Commissions ==
Smalling has been commissioned for numerous notable portraits, including former Prime Minister of the United Kingdom Tony Blair, former U.S. Supreme Court Justice Sandra Day O'Connor, former Oklahoma Supreme Court Justice Yvonne Kauger, business magnate and philanthropist T. Boone Pickens, and Dallas Cowboys and University of Oklahoma football coach Barry Switzer.

Smalling has also been commissioned for major public art projects and corporate collaborations. Recently, he has collaborated with APMEX for the Asian Zodiac Series: Year of the Dragon, FanDuel for a National Native American Hall of Fame project, Emser Tile for their Native Narratives Series and Incredible Technologies for Ultra Rush Gold, as well as the Delaware Nation of Oklahoma.

== Exhibitions ==
Smalling has exhibited internationally, with notable exhibitions including Operation Lady Justice: The Visage of Modern Matriarchy at the Oklahoma Hall of Fame, Ikbi: Choctaw and Chickasaw Southeastern Cultural Art at the Oklahoma Hall of Fame, Salon du Dessin et da la Peinture à l’Eau at the Grand Palais in Paris, and the State of Oklahoma Centennial Show at Disney World's Epcot.

== Awards and Recognitions ==
Smalling's work has garnered recognition for its unique style and cultural significance. He was selected as a Choctaw Nation Master Artist and has been involved in various cultural projects that highlight Native American heritage and contributions to contemporary art.
