= Ken Rinaldo =

- Born: Kenneth E. Rinaldo; 1958 (age 67–68); Queens, New York
- Education: San Francisco State University, University of California, Santa Barbara
- Known for: Interactive art installations using technology
- Website: kenrinaldo.com

Kenneth E. Rinaldo (born 1958) is an American neo-conceptual artist and arts educator, known for his interactive robotics, 3D animation, and BioArt installations. His works include Autopoiesis (2000), and Augmented Fish Reality (2004), a fish-driven robot.

== Biography ==
Rinaldo was born in Queens and raised in Long Island. He attended Ward Melville High School in East Setauket, New York. He moved to California and earned an Associate of Science degree in Computer Science from Cañada College, 1982. He went on to earn a Bachelor of Arts in communications from The University of California, Santa Barbara; 1984 and a Master of Fine Arts in Conceptual Information Arts from San Francisco State University, 1996. At San Francisco State he studied with artists Steve Wilson, Brian Rogers, George LeGrady and Paul DeMarinis.

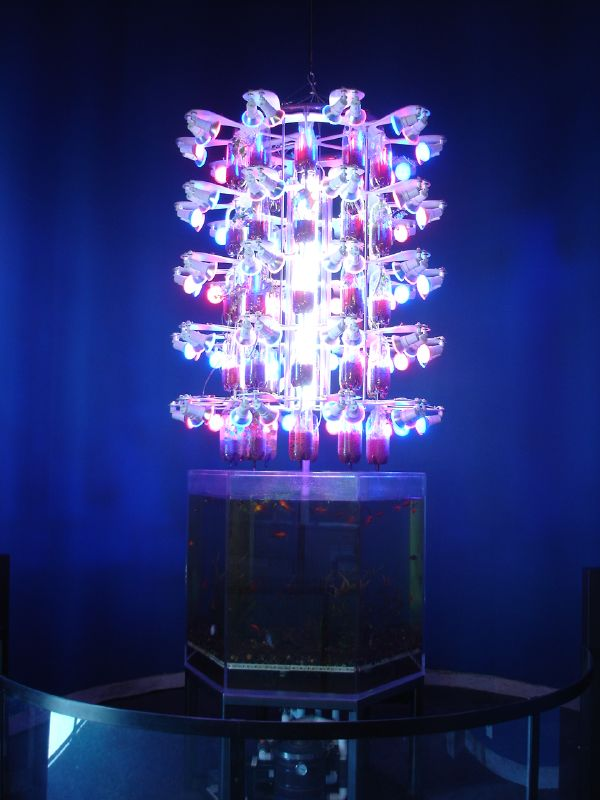
'Farm Fountain' living sculpture, a collaboration with Amy Youngs.

In 2000 he received the first prize at the VIDA 3.0 International Artificial Life Competition for Autopoiesis; in 2001 the same piece received an honorable mention at the Ars Electronica Festival. In 2004 Rinaldo's Augmented Fish Reality, a fish-driven robot, won an award of distinction at the same festival. In 2020 he was selected for the 2020 edition of The New Art Fest, an annual art and technology festival in Lisbon.

Rinaldo directs the Art and Technology Program in the Department of Art at Ohio State University.
