= Edgar Heap of Birds =

Native American artist

- Hock E Aye Vi
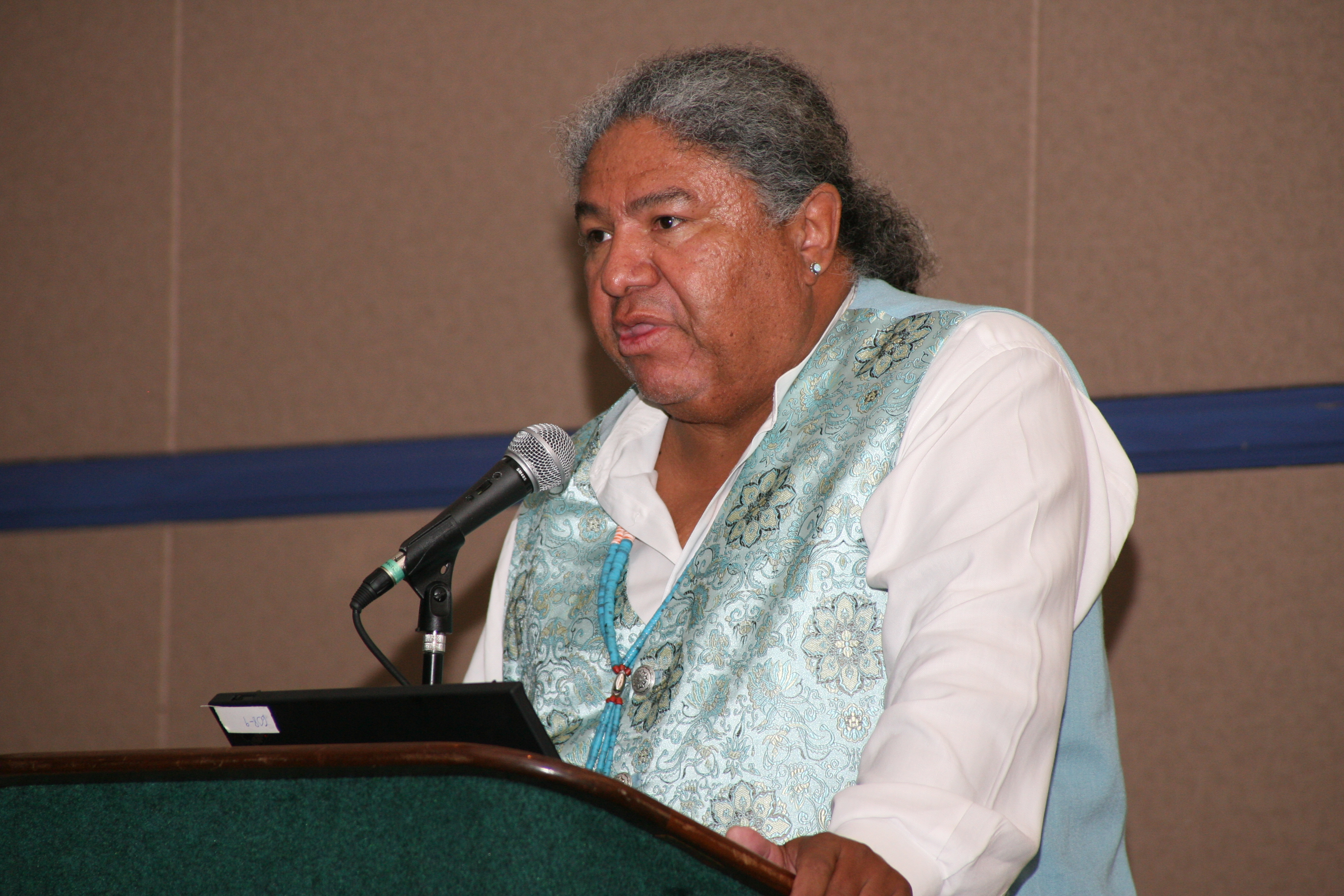
- Heap of Birds at the 2009; Americans for the Arts convention
- Born: Hock E Aye Vi; November 22, 1954; Wichita, Kansas, United States
- Citizenship: Cheyenne and Arapaho Tribes, United States
- Education: MFA Tyler School of Art, BFA University of Kansas, Royal College of Art
- Known for: Painting, drawing, printmaking, sculpture, installation, conceptual
- Notable work: In Our Language, Wheel
- Website: eheapofbirds.com//

Edgar Heap of Birds (Cheyenne: Hock E Aye Vi) is a multi-disciplinary artist. His art contributions include public art messages, large-scale drawings, Neuf series acrylic paintings, prints, and monumental porcelain enamel on steel outdoor sculpture.

He is Southern Cheyenne and enrolled in the Cheyenne and Arapaho Tribes.

He sits on the board for MoMA PS1.

== Early life and education ==
Hachivi Edgar Heap of Birds was born on November 22, 1954, in Wichita, Kansas, where his father worked in the aeronautical industry. He attended East High School in Wichita and graduated in 1972. After graduation, Heap of Birds studied at Haskell Indian Junior College in Lawrence, Kansas.

In 1976 Heap of Birds earned his Bachelor of Fine Arts from University of Kansas in Lawrence, Kansas and in 1979 he received his Master of Fine Arts from Temple University's Tyler School of Art in Philadelphia, Pennsylvania. In between his undergraduate and graduate studies, Heap of Birds also took classes at the Royal College of Art in London, England from 1976 to 1977.

In 2008, Heap of Birds was awarded an Honorary Doctors of Fine Arts from the Massachusetts College of Art and Design in Boston, Massachusetts.

In 2018, Heap of Birds was awarded an honorary doctorate of arts degree from the California Institute of the Arts at the institute's 2018 commencement ceremony on May 11.

== Professional career ==
Dead Indian Stories, monoprint, Honolulu Museum of Art

Wheel

Heap of Birds has taught as visiting professor at Yale University, Rhode Island School of Design, and Michaelis School of Fine Art, University of Cape Town, South Africa. At the University of Oklahoma, Heap of Birds teaches in Native American Studies and previously taught Fine Arts.

He is known for text-based conceptual art, such as Dead Indian Stories in the Honolulu Museum of Art. It superficially resembles public signage, but is actually commentary on the Native American experience. An example of his site-specific public signage projects is Building Minnesota (1990), a signage installation mounted on the banks of the Mississippi River in Minneapolis, Minnesota and commissioned by the Walker Art Center. In it, Heap of Birds set forty large, metal, billboard-like signs along Minneapolis's downtown riverfront. The signs honored the forty Dakota men who were sentenced to death by president Abraham Lincoln and his vice president Andrew Johnson after the Dakota War of 1862, in what is the largest mass execution in American history. The piece became a focal point "of mourning and remembrance to which people brought gifts and offerings" in memory of the men who were executed.

These 39 men were those that remained of 303 Sioux who were originally sentenced to death following the murder and rape of more than 800 American men, women and children civilians in the Dakota War. The original 303 were sentenced to death by a military commission. President Lincoln after conducting a personal review, considered there was only strong enough evidence to execute 39; who were guilty of massacres which were separate to battles, this number was later reduced to 38. He did this against the advice of General Pope, Minnesota Senator Morton S. Wilkinson, and Governor Alexander Ramsey; who feared a continuation of violence due to revenge attacks if the White population did not see that justice was done.

Heap of Birds created a fifty-foot signature, outdoor sculpture titled "Wheel" as a signature entrance piece for the Gio Ponti (North) building of the Denver Art Museum. The circular porcelain enamel on steel work was commissioned by the Denver Art Museum and is inspired by the traditional Medicine Wheel of the Big Horn Mountains of Wyoming.

== Exhibitions ==
Heap of Birds has exhibited nationally and internationally. An early solo exhibition was Full Blooded (1984) at the Center of the American Indian in Oklahoma City, Oklahoma.

== Awards ==
Heap of Birds has received grants and awards from the National Endowment for the Arts, the Rockefeller Foundation, The Louis Comfort Tiffany Foundation, The Wallace Foundation, the Bonfil Stanton Foundation, and The Pew Charitable Trusts.

In 2012, Heap of Birds was named a Fellow of United States Artists. In 2025, he was elected as a member of the American Academy of Arts and Letters.

== Books ==
- Blasted Allegories, an Anthology of Artists Writings, New Museum-MIT Press, 1987.
- Makers, Point Riders Press, 1998.
- The Myth of the Primitive, Susan Hiller (Editor), Routledge Press, 1991.
- Completing The Circle: Artists’ Books On The Environment, Minnesota Center for Book Arts, 1992.
- Visit Teepee Town, Native Writing After the Detours, Dianne Glancy and Mark Nowak, Coffee House Press, 1999.
- National Museum of the American Indian (U.S.) (2008). Most Serene Republics: Edgar Heap of Birds. Kathleen Ash-Milby, Truman Lowe, Edgar Heap of Birds (eds.). Washington, D.C: National Museum of the American Indian, Smithsonian Institution. ISBN 9781933565125.
