= Sulcus primigenius =

Roman ritual plowing

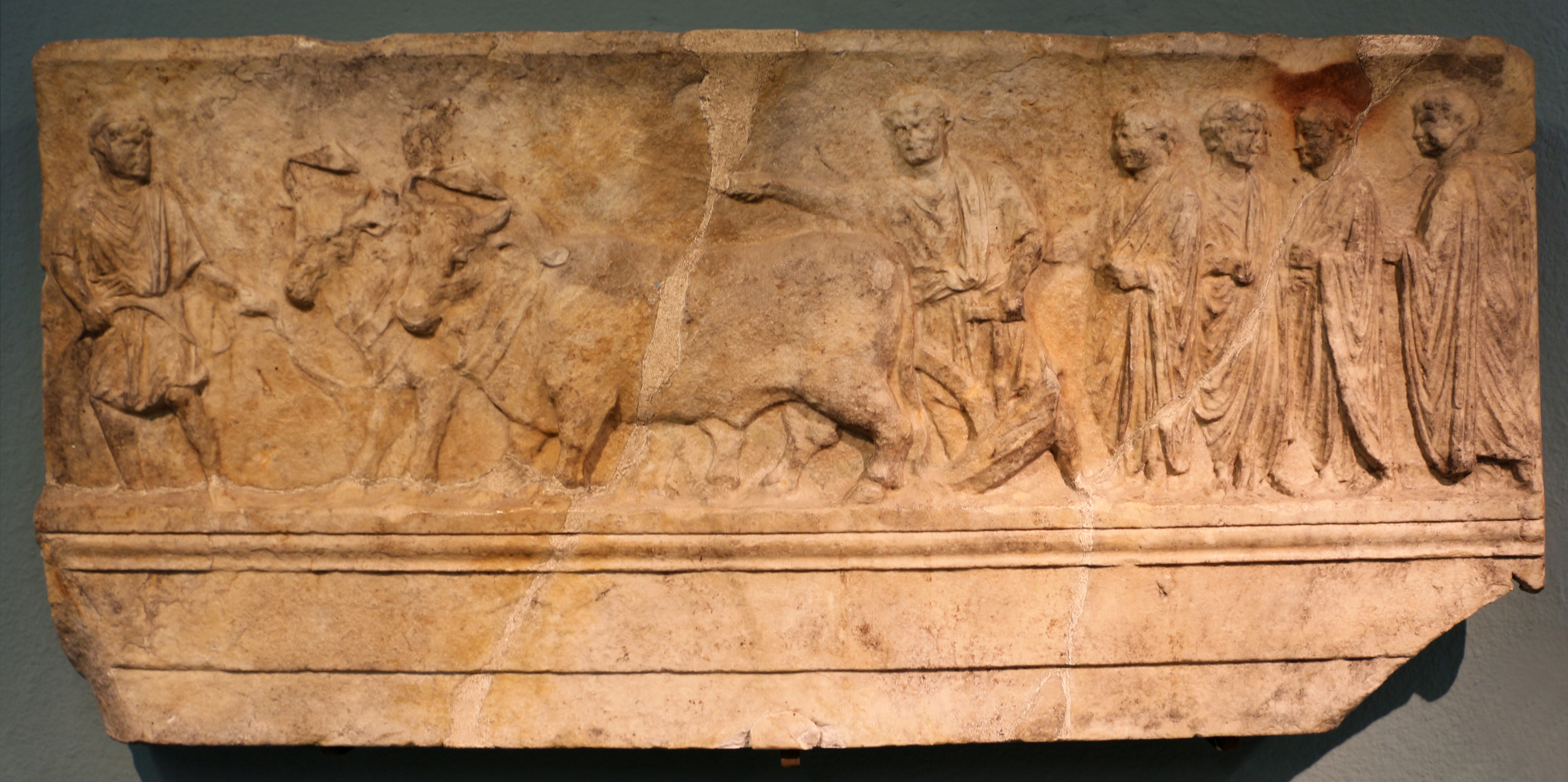
A 1st-century relief thought to show the sulcus primigenius ritual during the founding of Aquileia, a Roman colony near moden Venice, Italy. The relief differs from literary accounts in that the plower is shown bareheaded and the team appears to be made of two oxen rather than a bull and a cow.

The sulcus primigenius (Latin for "initial furrow") was the ancient Roman ritual of plowing the boundary of a new city—particularly formal colonies—prior to distributing its lots or erecting its walls. The Romans considered the ritual extremely ancient, believing their own founder Romulus had introduced it from the Etruscans, who had also fortified most of their cities. The ritual had the function of rendering the course of the city wall sacrosanct but, owing to the necessity of some profane traffic such as the removal of corpses to graveyards, the city gates were left exempted from the ritual.

== Ritual ==
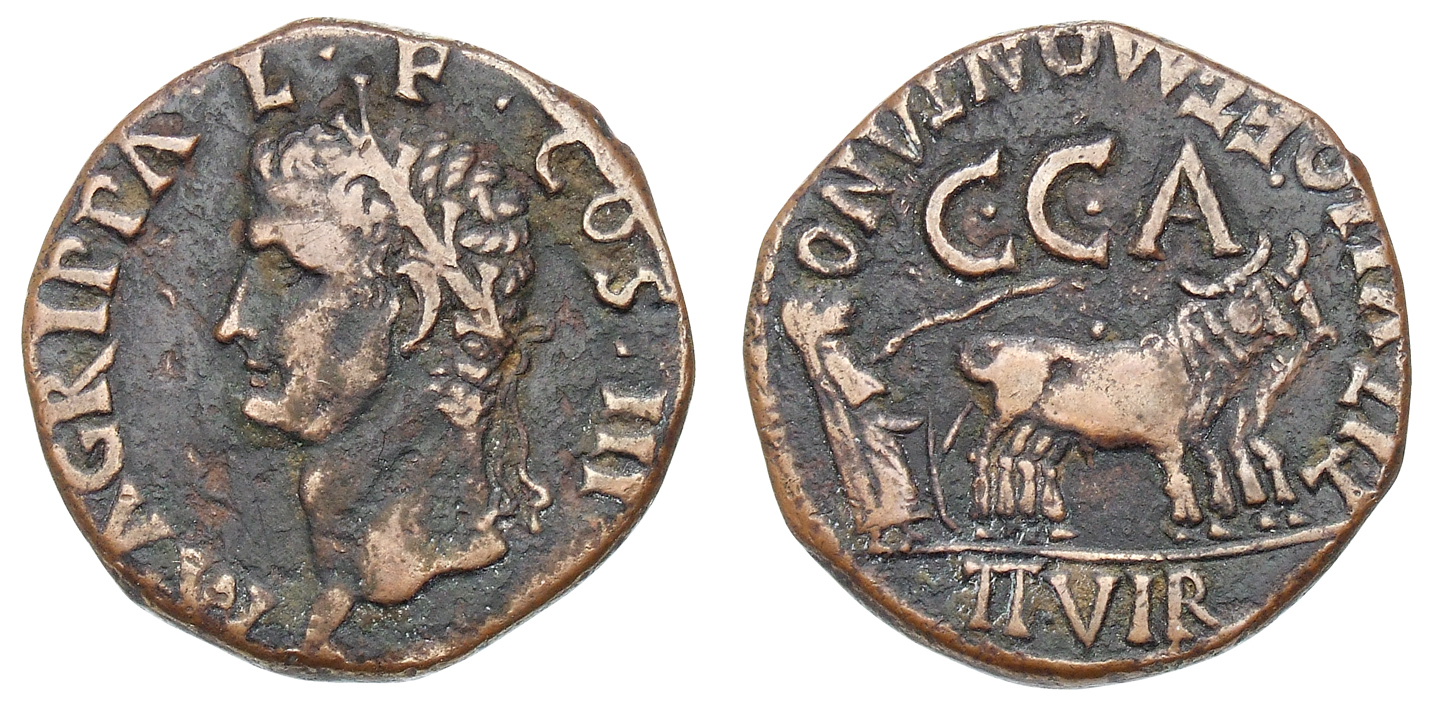
The sulcus primigenius ritual on an early dupondius of Caesaraugusta, now Zaragoza in Spain, honoring Marcus Vipsanius Agrippa (AD 39)

According to surviving classical sources, the sulcus primigenius needed to occur on an auspicious day of the Roman calendar, further confirmed by augury or similar consultation of omens. The magistrate or other official in charge of the ceremony personally set a bronze plowshare on a wooden ard, which was then attached to a yoked pair of cattle. All literary sources state that the team should consist of a cow on the left and a bull on the right, driven counterclockwise so that the cow was to the inside and the bull to outside, although surviving numismatic evidence appears to show only bulls or standard oxen instead. The ritual was solemn enough that it needed to be performed wearing a toga and with covered head (capite velato) but, as it required the use of both hands, the magistrate's toga was worn wrapped tightly and cinched in Gabine style. In this manner, the magistrate whipped the cattle around the entire course of the future city walls. All of the clods of earth raised by the plow were supposed to fall to the inside, which was accomplished by keeping the plow crooked and by men following the magistrate and plow. This procedure simultaneously established an initial city wall (murus) from the clods and its protective ditch (fossa) from the furrow itself. This course was considered sacred and inviolable, which required that the plow be lifted across the locations of the future city gates so that it would be religiously permissible to enter and leave the town, particularly with profane cargo such as corpses or waste. The cattle were sacrificed at the end of the procedure. The city wall was subsequently raised over the earth beside the furrow, whose inner boundary set the outer limits for subsequent auspices performed by the city.

In Latin, the verb used to describe performing this ritual was urvāre ("to trace"). The Romans considered it an inheritance from Etruscan religion, meaning that it was presumably included among the sections on the founding of cities in the now-lost Books of Ritual (Libri Rituales). For the Romans, the sulcus primigenius was the essential establishment of a city to the point that Roman law held as late as Justinian that the furrow of the plow was the formal delimitation of a city's territory. In like manner, plows were used to deconsecrate walls, undoing any former ritual and removing any religious stigma from their destruction.

== Rome ==
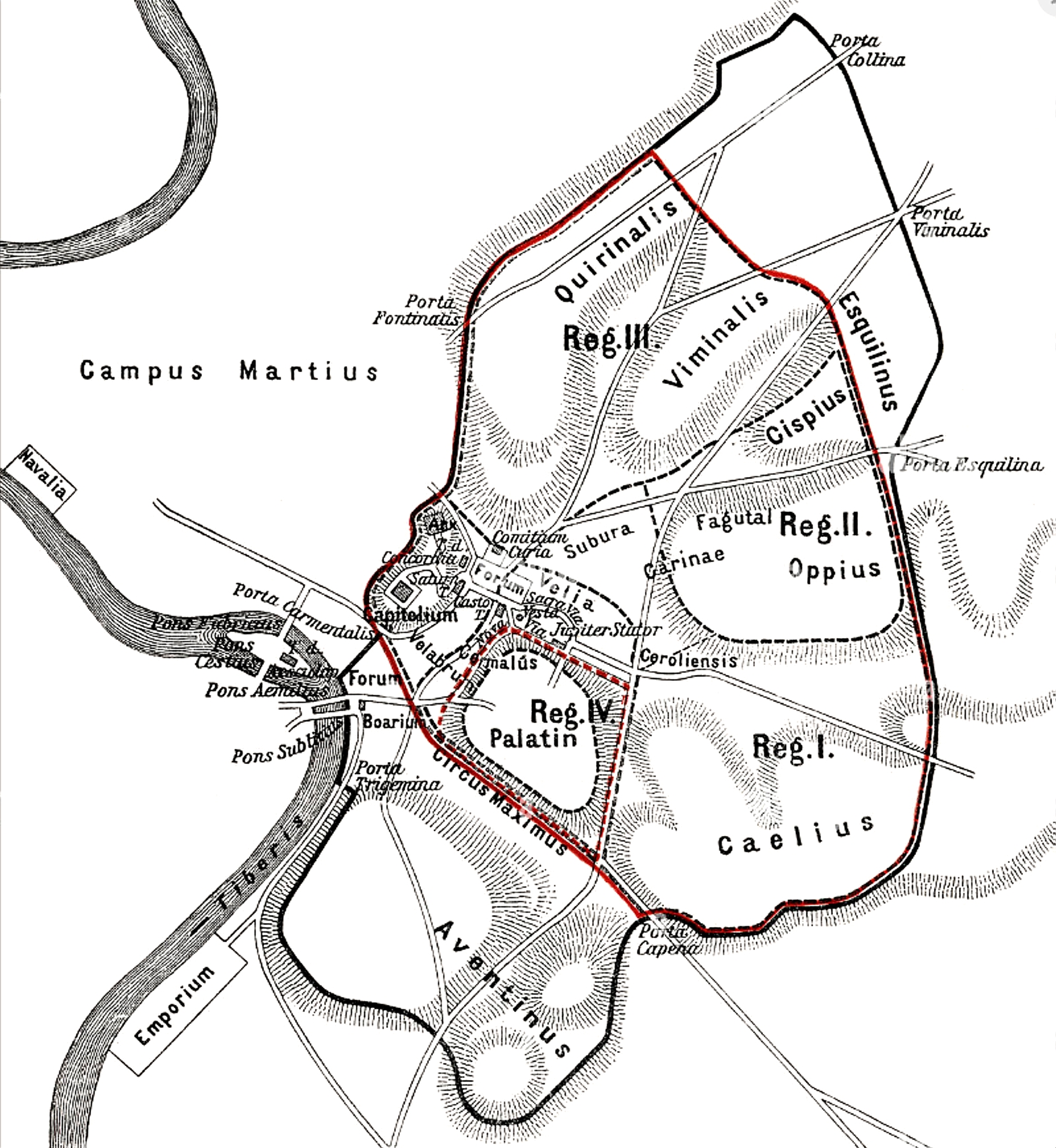
Conjectural map of Rome's ancient city and later Servian Walls (1902), omitting the extension Tacitus claimed had been made to include the Altar of Hercules

Plutarch relates the Roman legend that Romulus was guided in the foundation of Rome by Etruscan priests. The day—the 30th of an early Roman month, a new moon—was supposedly marked by a conjunction of the sun and moon producing an eclipse, although modern scholars consider this a mistaken backward application of celestial tables of Plutarch's time and no actual eclipse occurred within a century of the suggested date. After creating a circular pit or trench (mundus), Romulus had the city's initial settlers throw soil from their homelands into it along with representative sacrifices of the necessities and luxuries of settled life. Plutarch places this in a valley at the Comitium, although most accounts placed Romulus's settlement on the Palatine Hill. Romulus then plowed the sulcus primigenius, establishing Rome's quadrangular first walls and initial sacred boundary. In his discussion of Claudius's later expansion of the pomerium, Tacitus relates that his own belief was that Romulus's furrow and Rome's initial boundary—though unmarked by the 1st century when he was writing—had included the Altar of Hercules in the Forum Boarium and then ran east along the base of the Palatine to the Altar of Consus before turning north to include the Curia Hostilia and the shrine of the Lares Praestites at the Regia and ending at the Forum Romanum; this is only two sides of the course but—since he ascribes the inclusion of the Forum and the Capitol to Titus Tatius—it presumably would have run along the other two sides of the Palatine. (Lanciani notes several problems with this proposed course, which in the archaic period would have probably run through marshland.) Dionysius of Halicarnassus, possibly overstating the point, states that Romulus's furrow was continuous rather than leaving the necessary spaces at the wall's gates. Dionysius then states that Romulus offered sacrifices and provided public games. Before the settlers could enter the city and build their houses, he lit fires before their tents, which they leapt over to expiate any previous guilt or offense and to purify themselves. They then offered their own sacrifices, each as well as they were able. (Against this, Plutarch held the Parilia festival was long kept without any sacrifice at all to commemorate the sanctity of the event of the city's founding.) When the city's walls were later expanded by Rome's kings and under the Republic, the formal sacred boundary was marked with boundary stones. Varro noted the same had been done at Aricia.

== Other settlements ==
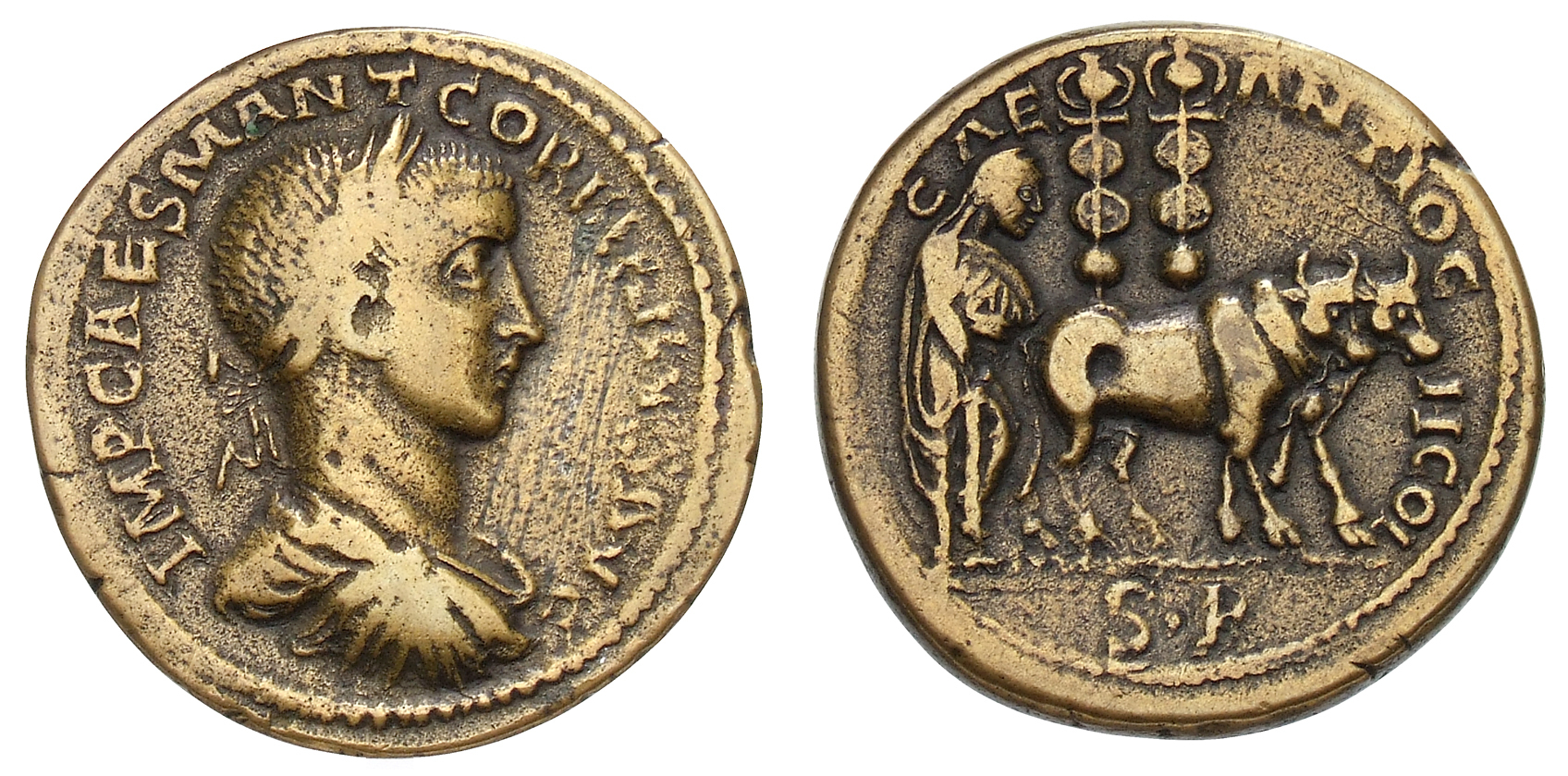
A provincial bronze coin of Antiochia ad Pisidiam under Gordian III (c. 240), repeating a motif from its 1st century BC founding and showing the vexilla of two legions, presumably the 5th and 7th Legions who heavily settled the town.

The Romans thought many of the Latin towns had been established by the same ritual and used it for all of their formal colonies. Under influence from the Etruscans and Greeks, such colonies were typically established with Hippodamian grids or similar centuriation, meaning their walls' gates were typically placed at each end of major thoroughfares known as decumani and cardines. The walls frequently varied from perfect squares or rectangles, however, owing to local topography.

The sulcus primigenius was a common reverse type for coins issued by the colonies, often appearing with their first issues but sometimes continuing in use for centuries thereafter. The typical form was to show a magistrate in ritu Gabino goading a team of oxen with a raised whip. The design was sometimes localized through the inclusion of legionary vexillas or adjusting the cattle to reflect the size of local livestock. Nearly 30 examples of such issues are known, ranging from Iulia Constantia Zilil in Mauretania to Rhesaina in Mesopotamia.

== Literature ==
In Vergil's Aeneid, the hero Aeneas sees the Carthaginians following the ritual and later lays out Lavinium in Italy with his own plow.

As noted by Varro, Pomponius, Isidore, and St. Augustine, the Romans generally derived the etymology of urbs ("city") itself from orbis ("sphere") with regard to the ritual furrow established at its creation.

== See also ==
- Agriculture in ancient Rome
- Ancient Roman defensive walls
- Glossary of Roman religion
