= Romulus =

King of Rome from 753 to 716 BC

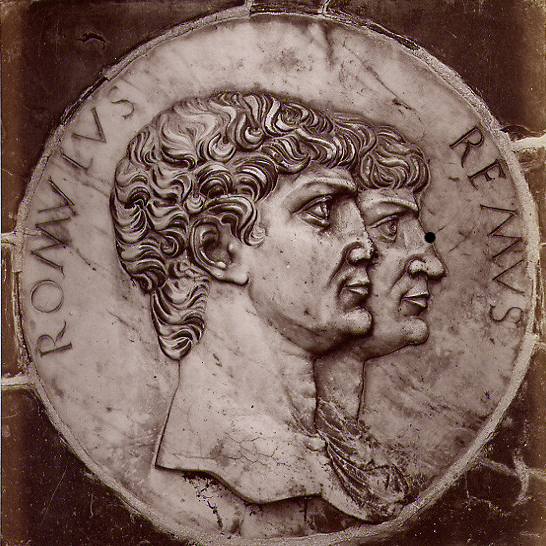
- Romulus and his twin brother Remus from a 15th-century frieze, Certosa di Pavia

King of Rome
- Reign: 753–716 BC (traditional dates)
- Successor: Numa Pompilius
- With: Titus Tatius (745–740 BC)
- Born: 771 BC (Plutarch); Alba Longa
- Died: Rome
- Spouse: Hersilia
- Father: Mars
- Mother: Rhea Silvia

Romulus (/ˈrɒmjʊləs/, Classical Latin: [ˈroːmʊɫʊs]) was the legendary founder and first king of Rome. Various traditions attribute the establishment of many of Rome's oldest legal, political, religious, and social institutions to Romulus and his contemporaries. Although many of these traditions incorporate elements of folklore, and it is not clear to what extent a historical figure underlies the mythical Romulus, the events and institutions ascribed to him were central to the myths surrounding Rome's origins and cultural traditions.

== Traditional account ==
The myths concerning Romulus involve several distinct episodes and figures, including the miraculous birth and youth of Romulus and his twin brother, Remus; Remus' murder and the founding of Rome; the Rape of the Sabine Women, and the subsequent war with the Sabines; a period of joint rule with Titus Tatius; the establishment of various Roman institutions; the death or apotheosis of Romulus, and the succession of Numa Pompilius.

=== Romulus and Remus ===
According to Roman mythology, Romulus and Remus were the sons of Rhea Silvia by the god Mars. Their maternal grandfather was Numitor, the rightful king of Alba Longa, through whom the twins were descended from both the Trojan hero Aeneas, and Latinus, the king of Latium. Before the twins' birth, Numitor's throne had been usurped by his brother, Amulius, who murdered Numitor's son or sons, and condemned Rhea Silvia to perpetual virginity by consecrating her a Vestal. (Note: Dionysius describes an ambush of Numitor's son, who was hunting; Livy indicates that there were multiple sons, but does not give any details of their murder. Dionysius also gives an alternate name, Ilia, for Rhea Silvia.) When Rhea became pregnant, she asserted that she had been visited by the god Mars. Amulius imprisoned her, and upon the twins' birth, ordered that they be thrown into the Tiber. But as the river had been swollen by rain, the servants tasked with disposing of the infants could not reach its banks, and so exposed the twins beneath a fig tree at the foot of the Palatine Hill.

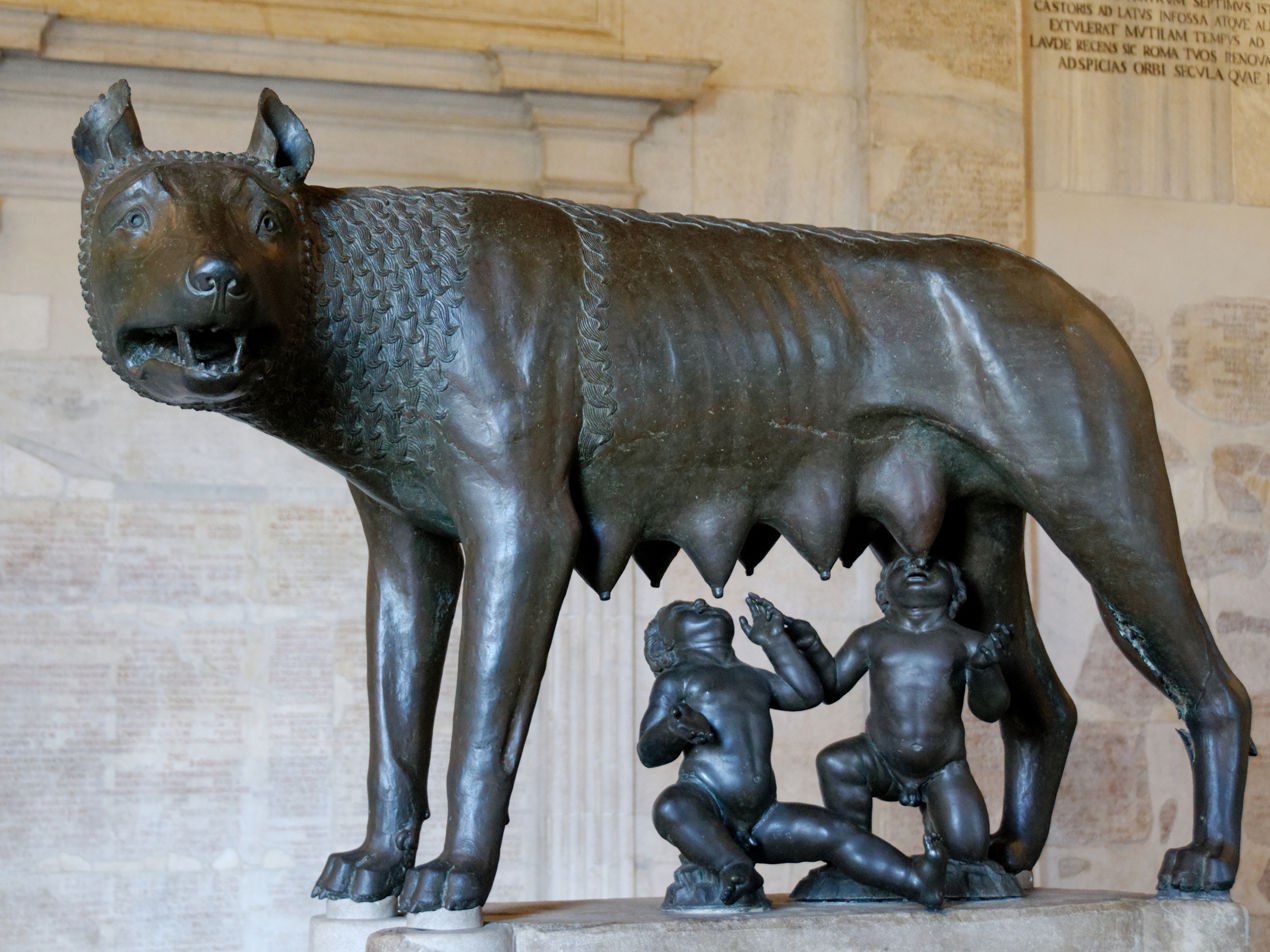
A statue of a She-wolf depicts the twins suckling.

In the traditional account, a she-wolf happened upon the twins, and suckled them until they were found by the king's herdsman, Faustulus, and his wife, Acca Larentia. (Note: In another version, the she-wolf of the legend was Acca Larentia herself, who was a prostitute nicknamed "Lupa" by the shepherds.) The brothers grew to manhood among the shepherds and hill-folk. After becoming involved in a conflict between the followers of Amulius and those of their grandfather Numitor, Faustulus told them of their origin. With the help of their friends, they lured Amulius into an ambush and killed him, restoring their grandfather to the throne. The princes then set out to establish a city of their own.

They returned to the hills overlooking the Tiber, near where they had been exposed as infants, but disagreed on the site of their new city. Each took up station on a different hill, and awaited an omen to decide between them. Remus sighted six vultures over the Aventine Hill, then Romulus saw a flight of twelve above the Palatine Hill. Remus argued for the Aventine based on priority, Romulus the Palatine based on number. The conflict escalated, and Romulus or one of his followers killed Remus. In a variant of the legend, the augurs favoured Romulus, who proceeded to plough a square furrow around the Palatine Hill to demarcate the walls of the future city (Roma Quadrata). When Remus derisively leapt over the furrow to show how inadequate it was against invaders, Romulus struck him down in anger. In another variant, Remus was killed during a melée, along with Faustulus.

=== Establishment of the city ===
The founding of Rome was commemorated annually on April 21, with the festival of the Parilia. (Note: Dionysius suggests that the Parilia may have predated the founding of the city, and been chosen by Romulus because it was an auspicious occasion.) (Note: The founding of Rome fell on the Parilia, according to the oldest surviving Roman calendar (Rodríguez Mayorgas 2010, p. 97).) Romulus' first act was to fortify the Palatine with the Murus Romuli, in the course of which he made a sacrifice to the gods. He laid out the city's boundaries with a furrow that he ploughed, performed another sacrifice, and with his followers set to work building the city itself. Romulus sought the assent of the people to become their king. With Numitor's help, he addressed them and received their approval. Romulus accepted the crown after he sacrificed and prayed to Jupiter, and after receiving favourable omens.

Romulus divided the populace into three tribes, known as the Ramnes, Titienses, and Luceres, (Note: These names probably do not date from the time of Romulus; modern scholars have inferred that they were originally ethnic tribes representing different elements of the early Roman population, with the Ramnes representing the Latins, the Titienses the Sabines, and the Luceres the Etruscans. The Luceres may have been a later addition to the original Romulean tribes, but as the Tiber formed the traditional boundary between Latium and Etruria, it is not unlikely that there were Etruscan settlers from the earliest period.) for taxation and military purposes. Each tribe was presided over by an official known as a tribune, and was further divided into ten curia, or wards, each presided over by an official known as a curio. Romulus also allotted a portion of land to each ward, for the benefit of the people. Nothing is known of the manner in which the tribes and curiae were taxed, but for the military levy, each curia was responsible for providing one hundred foot soldiers, a unit known as a century, (Note: As the name suggests, a unit of one hundred men, although in later times a century was usually smaller, comprising about sixty men.) and ten cavalry. Each Romulean tribe thus provided about one thousand infantry, and one century of cavalry; the three hundred cavalry became known as the Celeres, "the swift", and formed the royal bodyguard.

Choosing one hundred men from the leading families, Romulus established the Roman Senate. These men he called patres, the city fathers; their descendants came to be known as "patricians", forming one of the two major social classes at Rome. The other class, known as the "plebs" or "plebeians", consisted of the servants, freedmen, fugitives who sought asylum at Rome, those captured in war, and others who were granted Roman citizenship over time.

To encourage the growth of the city, Romulus outlawed infanticide, and established an asylum for fugitives on the Capitoline Hill. Here freemen and slaves alike could claim protection and seek Roman citizenship.

=== The Rape of the Sabine Women ===
The new city was filled with colonists, most of whom were young, unmarried men. While fugitives seeking asylum helped the population grow, single men greatly outnumbered women. With no intermarriage taking place between Rome and neighboring communities, the new city would eventually fail. Romulus sent envoys to neighboring towns, appealing to them to allow intermarriage with Roman citizens, but his overtures were rebuffed. Romulus formulated a plan to acquire women from other settlements. He announced a momentous festival and games, and invited the people of the neighboring cities to attend. Many did, in particular the Sabines, who came in droves. At a prearranged signal, the Romans seized and carried off the marriageable women among their guests.

The aggrieved cities prepared for war with Rome, and might have defeated Romulus had they been fully united. But impatient with the preparations of the Sabines, the Latin towns of Caenina, Crustumerium, and Antemnae took action without their allies. Caenina was the first to attack; its army was swiftly put to flight, and the town taken. After personally defeating and slaying the prince of Caenina in single combat, Romulus stripped him of his armour, becoming the first to claim the spolia opima, and vowed to build a temple to Jupiter Feretrius. Antemnae and Crustumerium were conquered in turn. Some of their people, chiefly the families of the abducted women, were allowed to settle in Rome.

Following the defeat of the Latin towns, the Sabines, under the leadership of Titus Tatius, marshalled their forces and advanced upon Rome. They gained control of the citadel by bribing Tarpeia, the daughter of the Roman commander charged with its defense. Without the advantage of the citadel, the Romans were obliged to meet the Sabines on the battlefield. The Sabines advanced from the citadel, and fierce fighting ensued. The nearby Lacus Curtius is said to be named after Mettius Curtius, a Sabine warrior who plunged his horse into its muck to stymie his Roman pursuers as he retreated. At a critical juncture in the fighting, the Romans began to waver in the face of the Sabine advance. Romulus vowed to build a temple to Jupiter Stator, (Note: Jupiter the Steadfast.) to keep his line from breaking. The bloodshed finally ended when the Sabine women interposed themselves between the two armies, pleading on the one hand with their fathers and brothers, and on the other with their husbands, to set aside their arms and come to terms. The leaders of each side met and made peace. They formed one community, to be jointly ruled by Romulus and Tatius.

=== Subsequent events ===
The two kings presided over the growing city of Rome for a number of years, before Tatius was slain in a riot at Lavinium, where he had gone to make a sacrifice. Shortly before, a group of envoys from Laurentum had complained of their treatment by Tatius' kinsmen, and he had decided the matter against the ambassadors. Romulus resisted calls to avenge the Sabine king's death, instead reaffirming the Roman alliance with Lavinium, and perhaps preventing his city from splintering along ethnic lines.

In the years following the death of Tatius, Romulus is said to have conquered the city of Fidenae, which, alarmed by the rising power of Rome, had begun raiding Roman territory. The Romans lured the Fidenates into an ambush, and routed their army; as they retreated into their city, the Romans followed before the gates could be shut, and captured the town. The Etruscan city of Veii, nine miles up the Tiber from Rome, also raided Roman territory, foreshadowing that city's role as the chief rival to Roman power over the next three centuries. Romulus defeated Veii's army, but found the city too well defended to besiege, and instead ravaged the countryside.

=== Death and succession ===
After a reign of thirty-seven years, Romulus is said to have disappeared in a whirlwind during a sudden and violent storm, as he was reviewing his troops on the Campus Martius. Livy says that Romulus was either murdered by the senators, torn apart out of jealousy, or was raised to heaven by Mars, god of war. Livy believes the last theory regarding the legendary king's death, as it allows the Romans to believe that the gods are on their side, a reason for them to continue expansion under Romulus' name.

Romulus acquired a cult following, which later became assimilated with the cult of Quirinus, perhaps originally the indigenous god of the Sabine population. As the Sabines had not had a king of their own since the death of Titus Tatius, the next king of Rome, Numa Pompilius, was chosen from among the Sabines.

Various sources state that Romulus had a wife, Hersilia. In Livy, following the defeat of the Caeninenses and the Antemnates, the Sabine women begged Hersilia to intercede with her husband on behalf of their families so that they would be received into the state rather than slain by Roman arms. In Dionysius, Hersilia was herself one of the Sabine women, and the only one who was already married at the time of her abduction. Dionysius explains that she was either mistaken for a virgin, or, he thinks more probably, that she was the mother of one of those abducted, and refused to abandon her daughter. Plutarch also relates that Hersilia was one of the Sabine women, and the only one already married. He also mentions that some authorities make Hersilia the wife of Hostus Hostilius, rather than Romulus. Two children are attributed to Romulus in Plutarch: a daughter, Prima, and a son, Avillius, but here Plutarch notes that his source, Zenodotus of Troezen, is widely disputed.

== Primary sources ==
Livy, Dionysius, and Plutarch rely on Quintus Fabius Pictor as a source. Other significant sources include Ovid's Fasti, and Virgil's Aeneid. Greek historians had traditionally claimed that Rome was founded by Greeks, a claim dating back to the logographer Hellanicus of Lesbos of 5th-century BC, who named Aeneas as its founder. Roman historians connect Romulus to Aeneas by ancestry and mention a previous settlement on the Palatine Hill, sometimes attributing it to Evander and his Greek colonists. To the Romans, Rome was the institutions and traditions they credit to their legendary founder, the first "Roman".

The legend as a whole encapsulates Rome's ideas of itself, its origins and moral values. For modern scholarship, it remains one of the most complex and problematic of all foundation myths. Ancient historians had no doubt that Romulus gave his name to the city. Most modern historians believe his name is a back-formation from the name of the city. Roman historians dated the city's foundation to between 758 and 728 BC, and Plutarch reports the calculation of Varro's friend Tarutius that 771 BC was the birth year of Romulus and his twin. The tradition that gave Romulus a distant ancestor in the semi-divine Trojan prince Aeneas was further embellished, and Romulus was made the direct ancestor of Rome's first Imperial dynasty. It is unclear whether or not the tale of Romulus or that of the twins are original elements of the foundation myth, or whether both or either were added.

=== Romulus-Quirinus ===
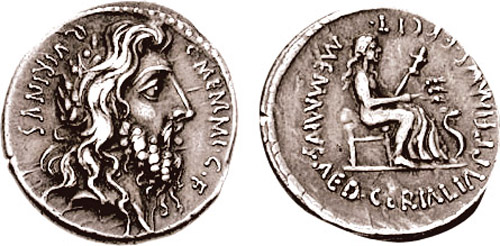
Roman Denarius with Romulus as Quirinus

Ennius (fl. 180s BC) refers to Romulus as a divinity in his own right, without reference to Quirinus. Roman mythographers identified the latter as an originally Sabine war-deity, and thus to be identified with Roman Mars. Lucilius lists Quirinus and Romulus as separate deities, and Varro accords them different temples. Images of Quirinus showed him as a bearded warrior wielding a spear as a god of war, the embodiment of Roman strength and a deified likeness of the city of Rome. He had a Flamen Maior called the Flamen Quirinalis, who oversaw his worship and rituals in the ordainment of Roman religion attributed to Romulus's royal successor, Numa Pompilius. There is however no evidence for the conflated Romulus-Quirinus before the 1st century BC.

Ovid in Metamorphoses XIV (lines 805-828) gives a description of the deification of Romulus and his wife Hersilia, who are given the new names of Quirinus and Hora respectively. Mars, the father of Romulus, is given permission by Jupiter to bring his son up to Olympus to live with the Olympians.

One theory regarding this tradition proposes the emergence of two mythical figures from an earlier, singular hero. While Romulus is a founding hero, Quirinus may have been a god of the harvest, and the Fornacalia a festival celebrating a staple crop (spelt). Through the traditional dates from the tales and the festivals, they are each associated with one another. A legend of the murder of such a founding hero, the burying of the hero's body in the fields (found in some accounts), and a festival associated with that hero, a god of the harvest, and a food staple is a pattern recognized by anthropologists. Called a "dema archetype", this pattern suggests that in a prior tradition, the god and the hero were in fact the same figure and later evolved into two.

== Historicity ==
Possible historical bases for the broad mythological narrative remain unclear and disputed. (Note: The archaeologist Andrea Carandini is one of very few modern scholars who accept Romulus and Remus as historical figures, based on the 1988 discovery of an ancient wall on the north slope of the Palatine Hill in Rome. Carandini dates the structure to the mid-8th century BC and names it the Murus Romuli. See: Carandini (1997), La nascita di Roma. Dèi, lari, eroi e uomini all'alba di una civiltà (Torino: Einaudi); Carandini (2006), Remo e Romolo. Dai rioni dei Quiriti alla città dei Romani (775/750 - 700/675 a. C. circa) (Torino: Einaudi); and Carandini (2011). Rome: Day One. Princeton, NJ: Princeton University Press. ISBN 978-0-691-13922-7.)

Modern scholarship approaches the various known stories of the myth as cumulative elaborations and later interpretations of Roman foundation myth. Particular versions and collations were presented by Roman historians as authoritative, an official history trimmed of contradictions and untidy variants to justify contemporary developments, genealogies and actions in relation to Roman morality. Other narratives appear to represent popular or folkloric tradition; some of these remain inscrutable in purpose and meaning. T.P. Wiseman sums up the whole issue as the mythography of an unusually problematic foundation and early history.

The unsavoury elements of many of the myths concerning Romulus have led some scholars to describe them as "shameful" or "disreputable". In antiquity such stories became part of anti-Roman and anti-pagan propaganda. More recently, the historian Hermann Strasburger postulated that these were never part of authentic Roman tradition, but were invented and popularized by Rome's enemies, probably in Magna Graecia, during the latter part of the fourth century BC. This hypothesis is rejected by other scholars, such as Tim Cornell (1995), who notes that by this period, the story of Romulus and Remus had already assumed its standard form, and was widely accepted at Rome. Other elements of the Romulus mythos clearly resemble common elements of folk tale and legend, and thus strong evidence that the stories were both old and indigenous. Likewise, Momigliano finds Strasburger's argument well-developed, but entirely implausible; if the Romulus myths were an exercise in mockery, they were a signal failure.

=== Tomb of Romulus ===
The Tomb of Romulus is a 139.7 centimetres (55.0 in) long rectangular chest composed of tuff that was itself likely extracted from the Capitoline Hill. The site was first discovered in 1899 by the Italian archaeologist Giacomo Boni as part of the same excavation that unearthed the Lapis Niger, an ancient stone that—according to legend—marked the location of either the death or grave of Romulus. However, Boni provided little documentation for the object, and the site was concealed once more by later construction projects in the 1930s that built a new entrance to the nearby Senate House. Later excavations at the same site that were initiated in 2019 in honor of Giacomo Boni had—by 2020—rediscovered the artifact, which had only survived the earlier construction efforts due to a brick shell built specifically to encase the area.

Subsequent examination of the artifact indicates that it dates to the 6th-century BC, and therefore it is contemporaneous with the Lapis Niger. The proximity of the object to sites of prominent cultural and political importance, such as the Senate House and the Lapis Niger, may indicate that the tomb was itself assigned a great degree of social significance. Moreover, the symbolic connections between the area and the death of Romulus may indicate that the site was intended to serve as the hypogeum for the legendary figure. However, no human remains were found at the area and the partially mythical nature of the stories surrounding the death and burial of Romulus cast doubt upon their veracity. According to the archaeologist Alfonsina Russo, the director of the Colosseum Archaeologist Park, it is more likely that the site functioned as a cenotaph, an empty monument dedicated to Romulus by his cult, but not necessarily his genuine tomb. If the artifact is interpreted as a sarcophagus, then the surrounding temple may be compared to the heroa that permeated the Classical world, all of which were involved in cult worship of venerated heroes.

== Depictions in art ==
The episodes which make up the legend, most significantly that of the rape of the Sabine women, the tale of Tarpeia, and the death of Tatius have been a significant part of ancient Roman scholarship and the frequent subject of art, literature and philosophy since ancient times. This already began in Roman antiquity, when Romulus, together with Aeneas, was the dominant motif when it came to Rome's mythical past.

=== Palazzo Magnani ===
In the late 16th century, the wealthy Magnani family from Bologna commissioned a series of artworks based on the Roman foundation myth. The artists contributing works included a sculpture of Hercules with the infant twins by Gabriele Fiorini, featuring the patron's own face. The most important works were an elaborate series of frescoes collectively known as Histories of the Foundation of Rome by the Brothers Carracci: Ludovico, Annibale, and Agostino.

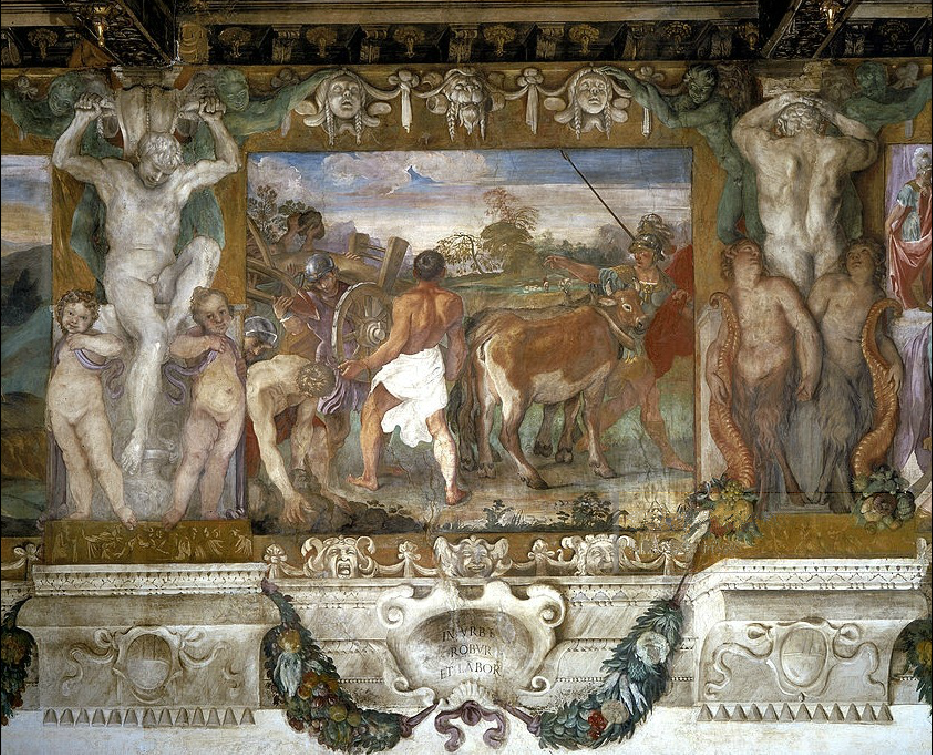
Romulus marking the city's boundaries with a plough

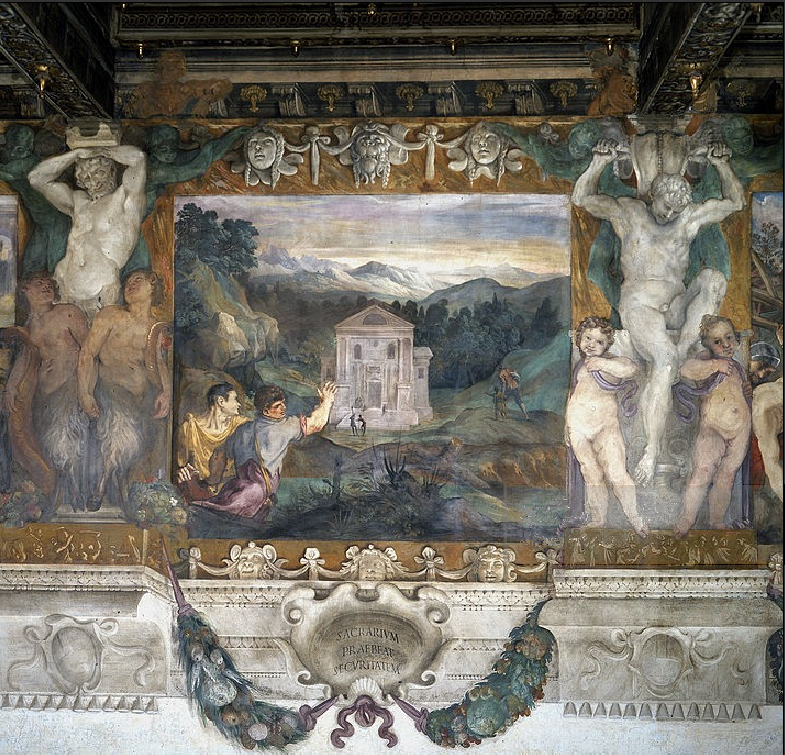
The Asylum (Inter duos Lucos)

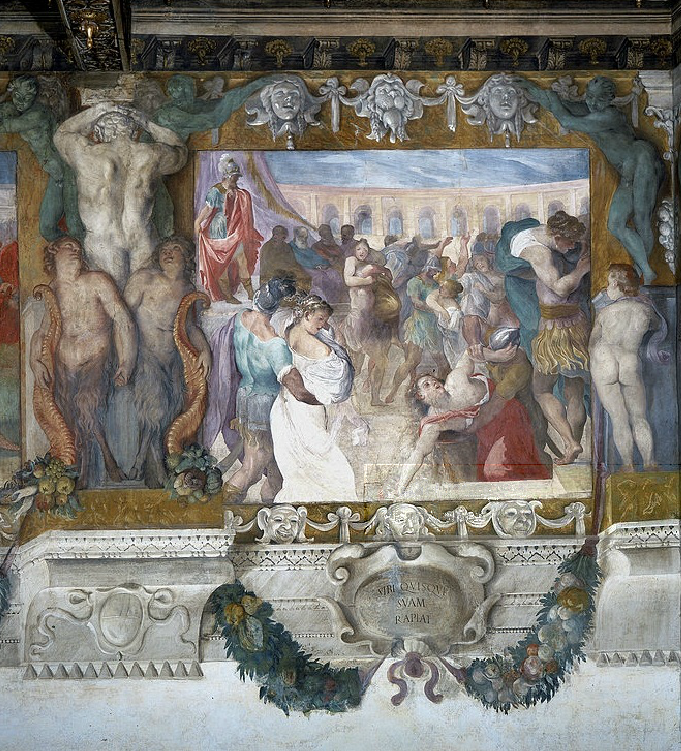
The rape of the Sabine women

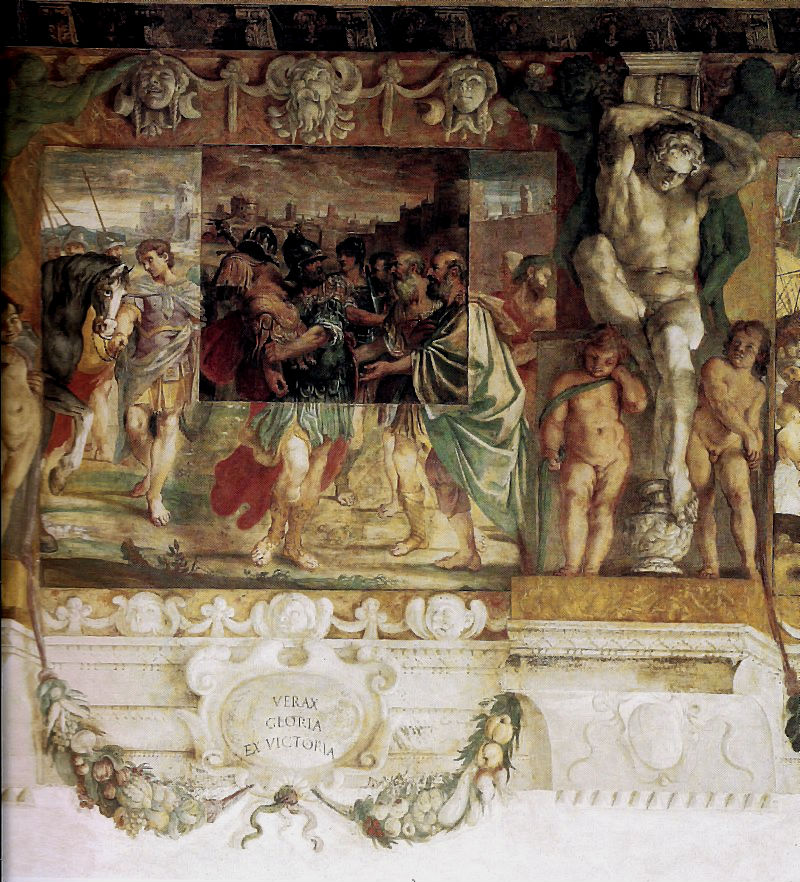
Romulus dedicating the temple to Jupiter Feretrius

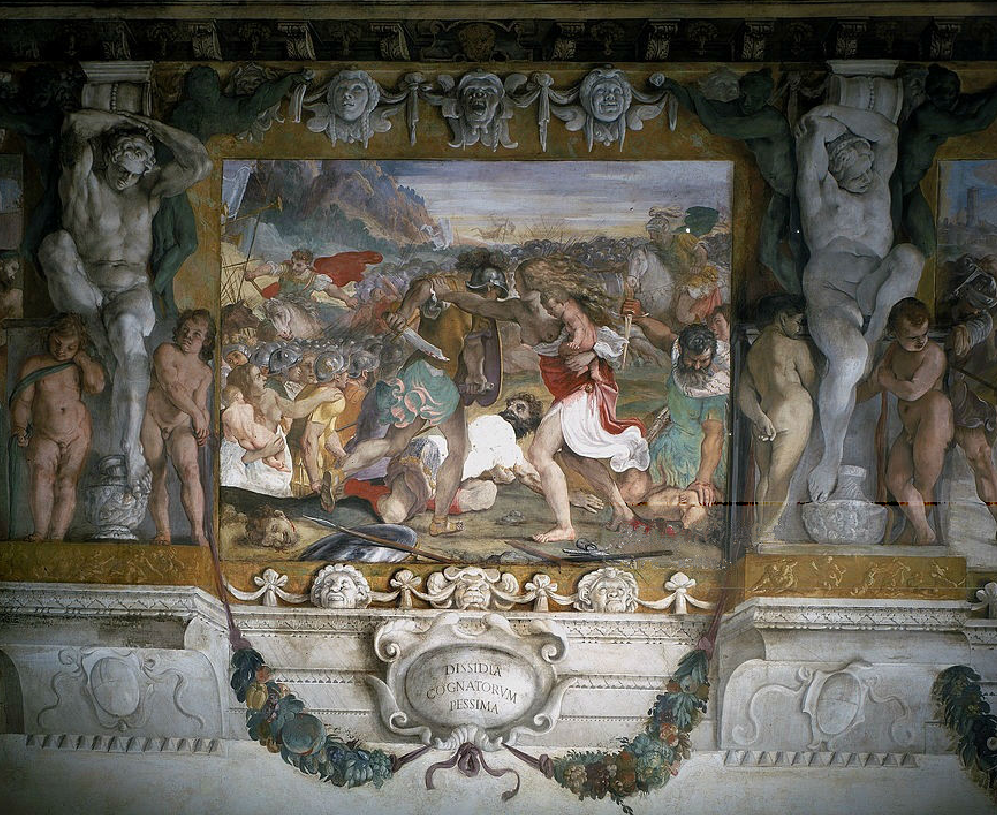
The Battle of the Lacus Curtius

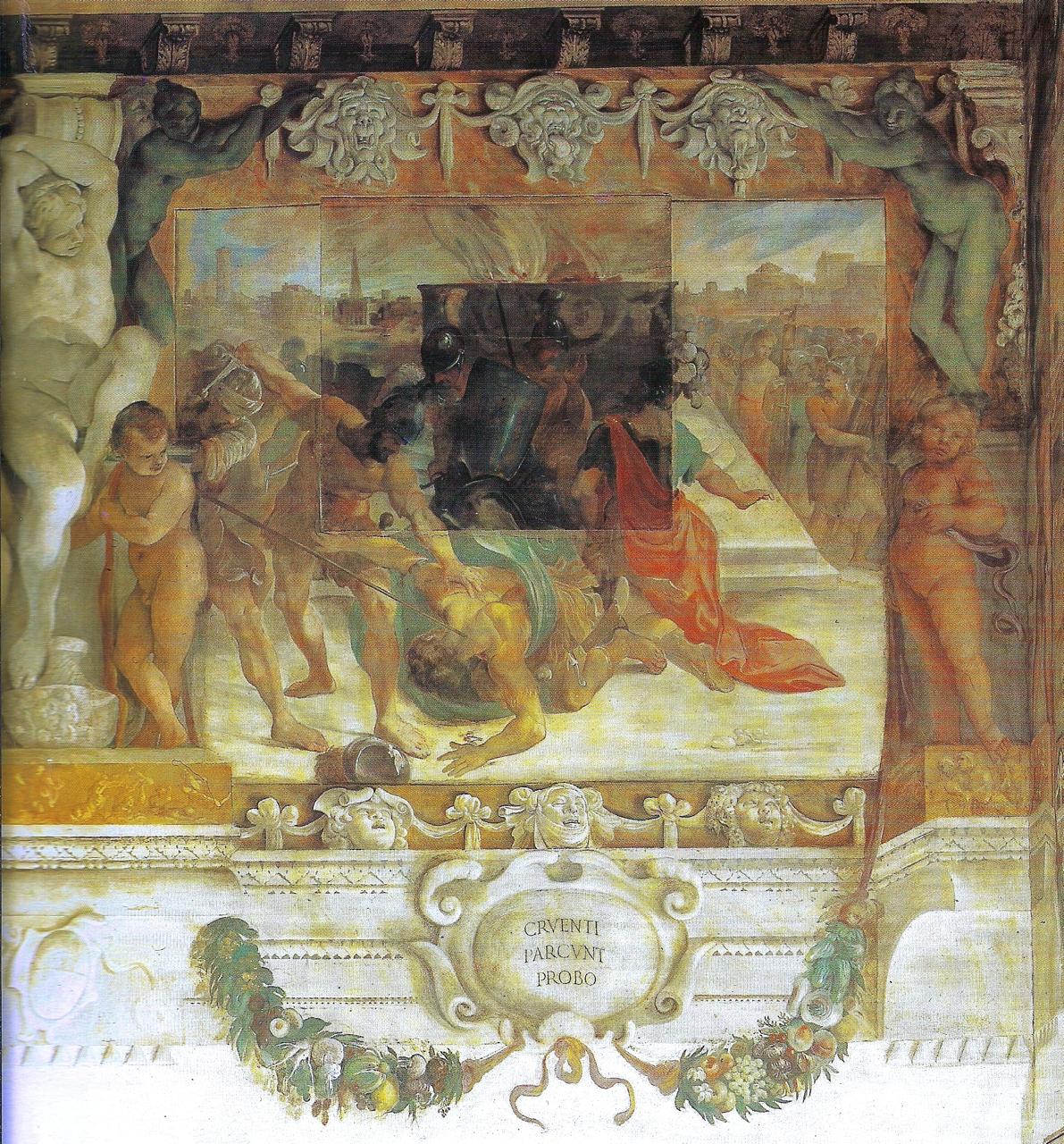
The death of Titus Tatius in Laurentium

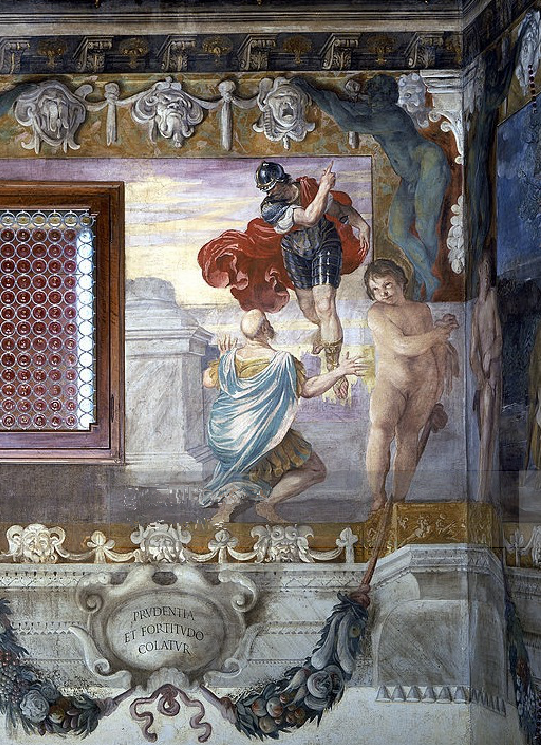
Romulus appearing to Proculus Julius

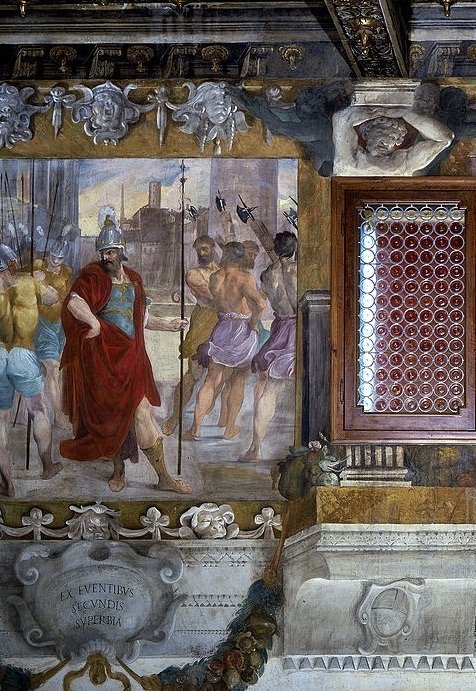
The Pride of Romulus

=== The rape of the Sabine women in paintings and sculpture ===
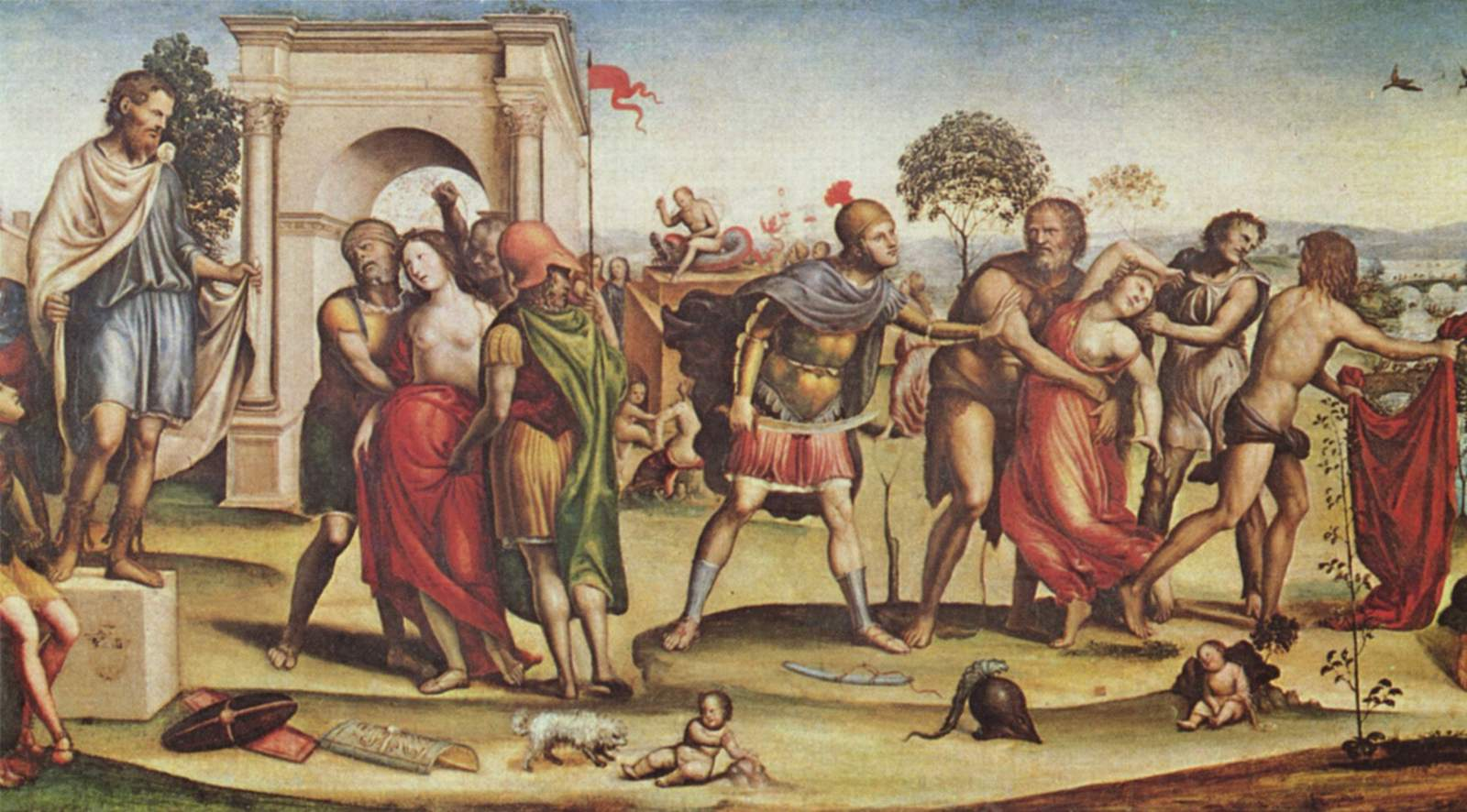
Il Sodoma (1507)

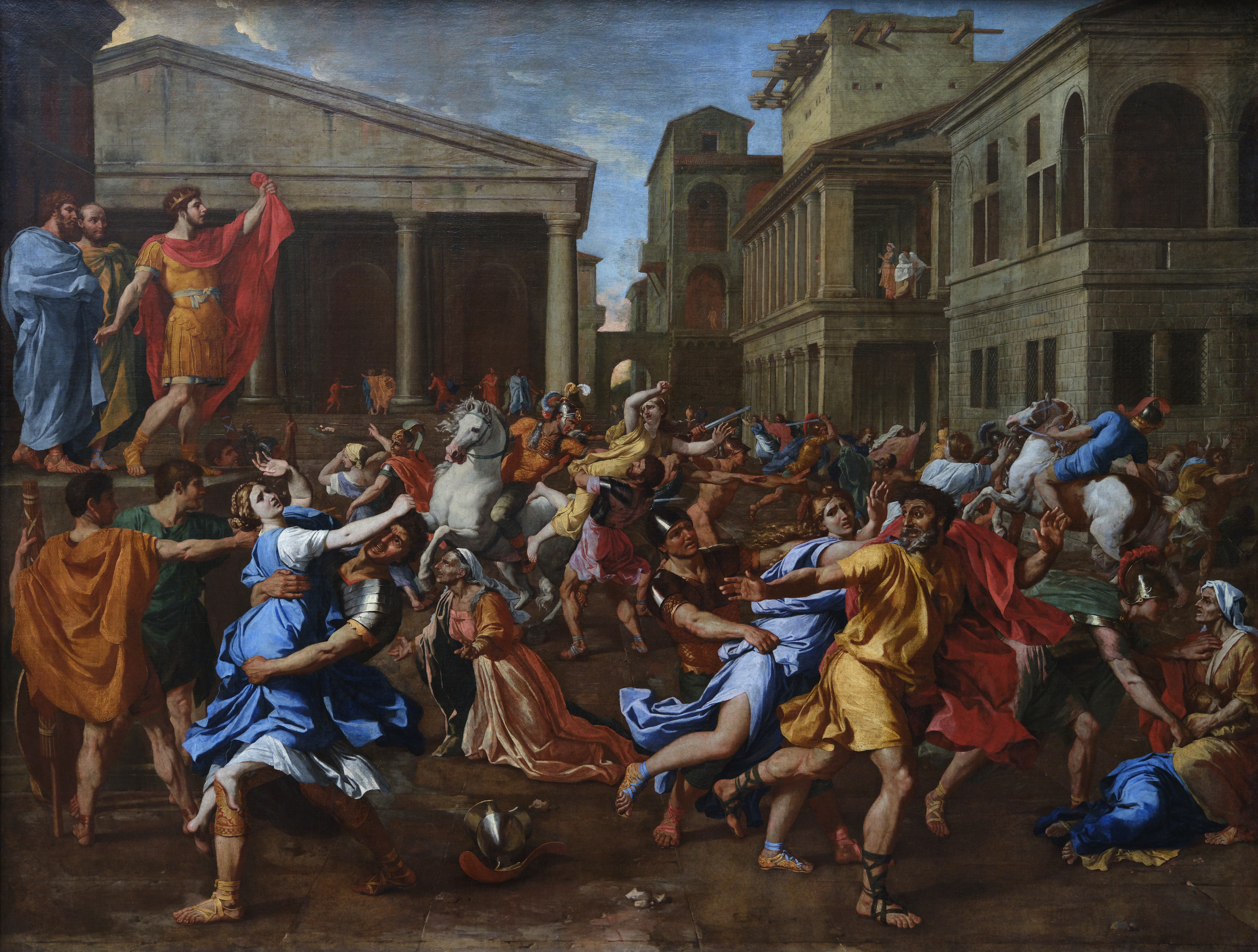
Nicolas Poussin (1638)

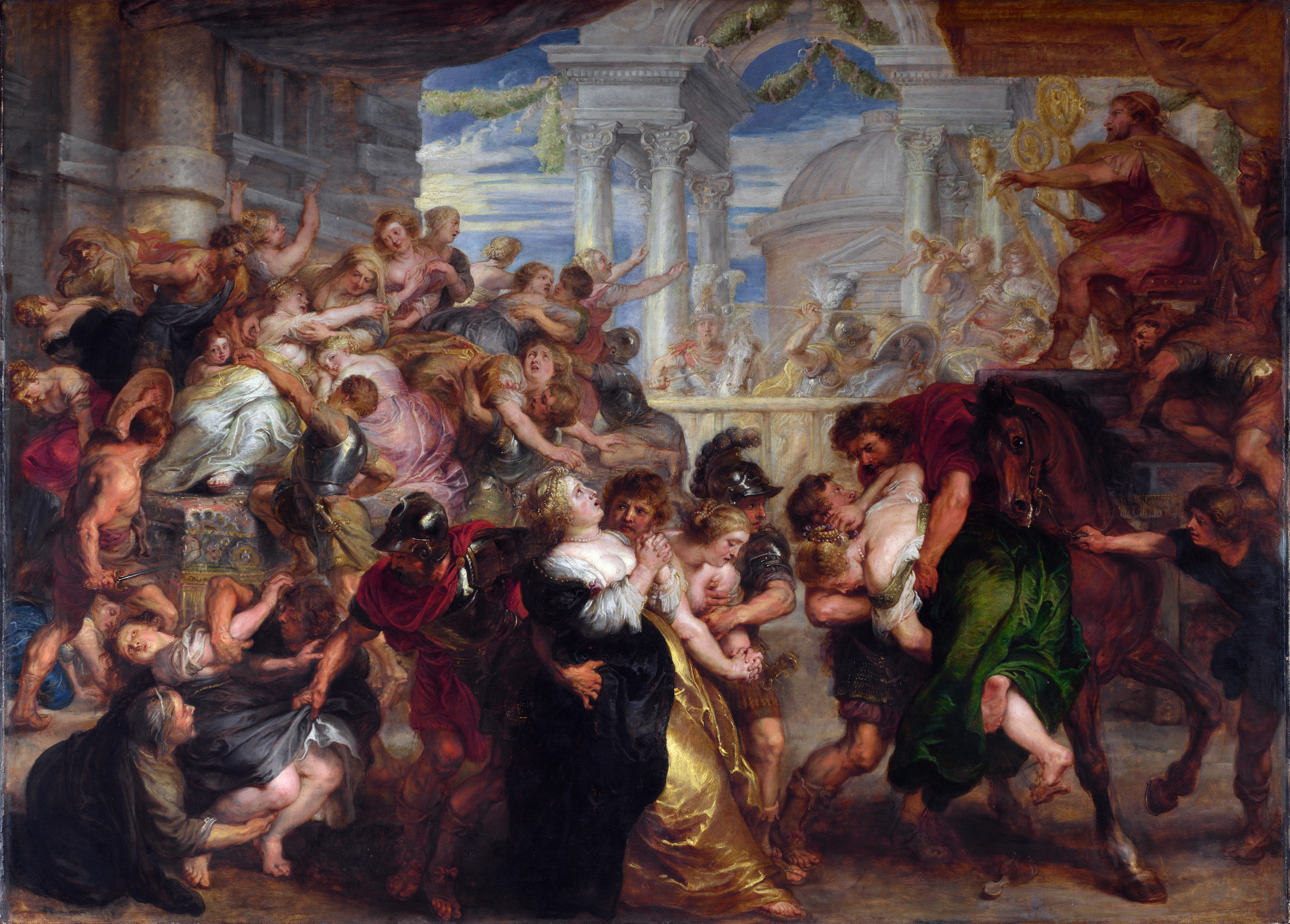
Peter Paul Rubens (1634–36)

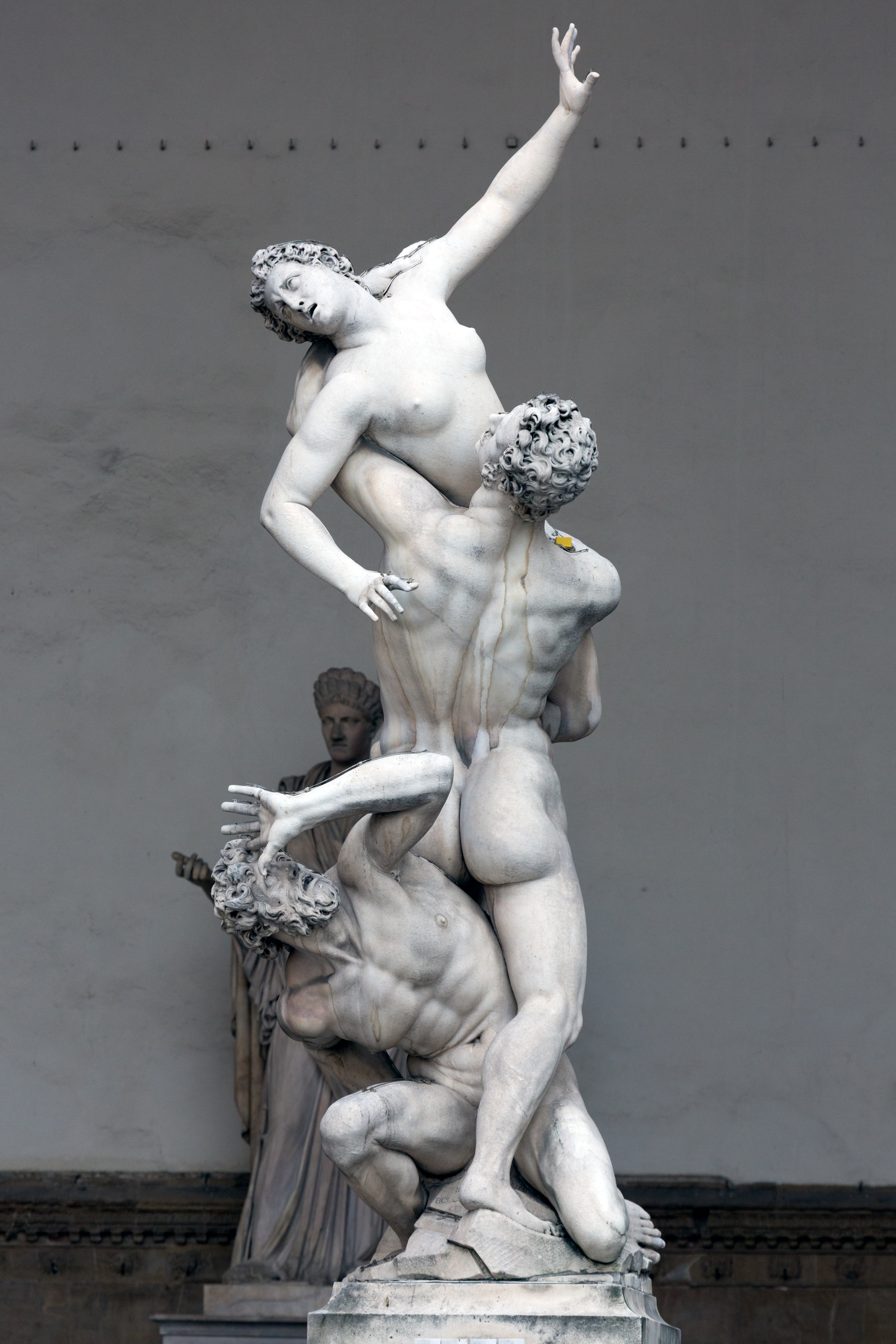
Giambologna (1583)

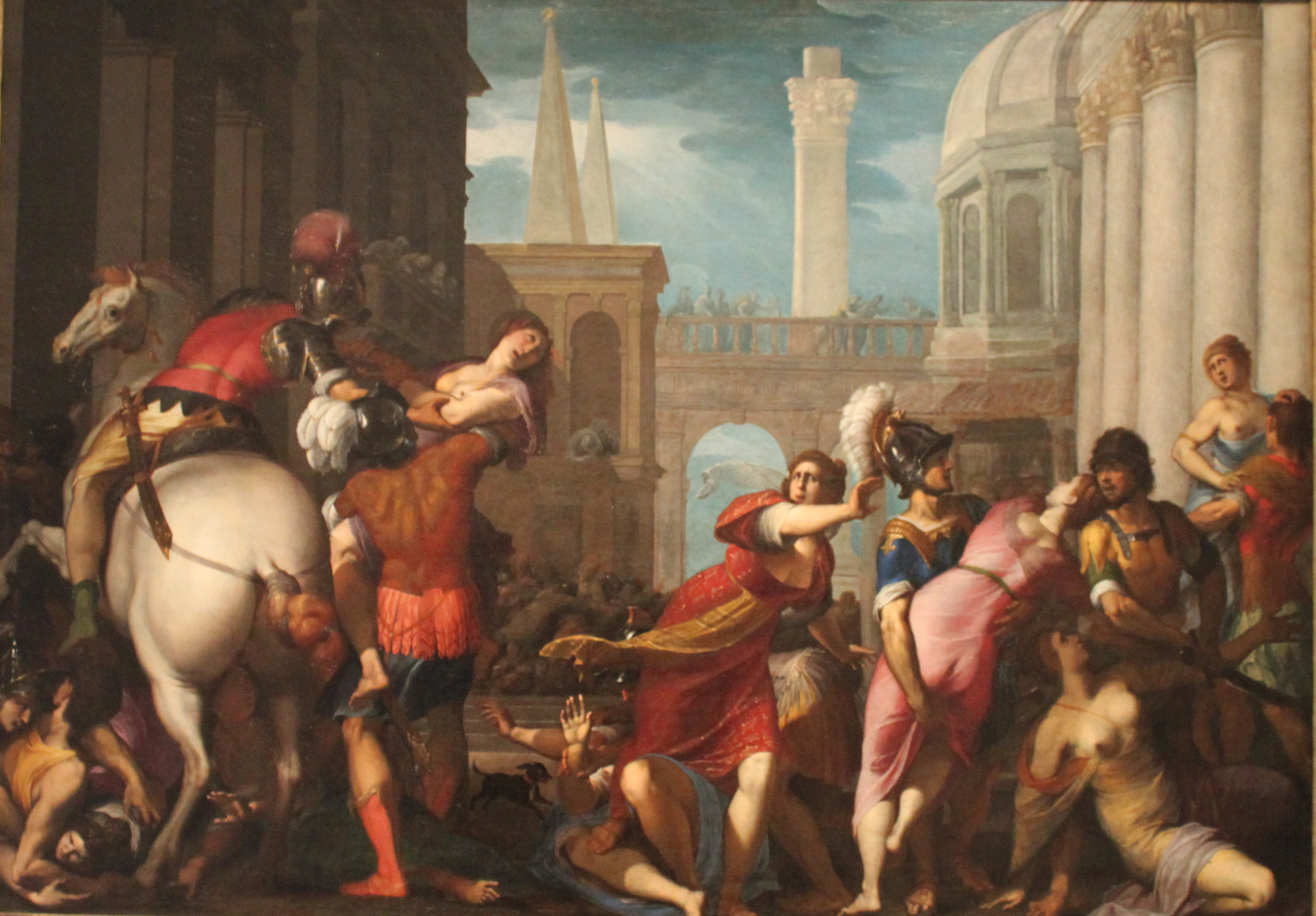
Jacopo Ligozzi (c.1565–1627)

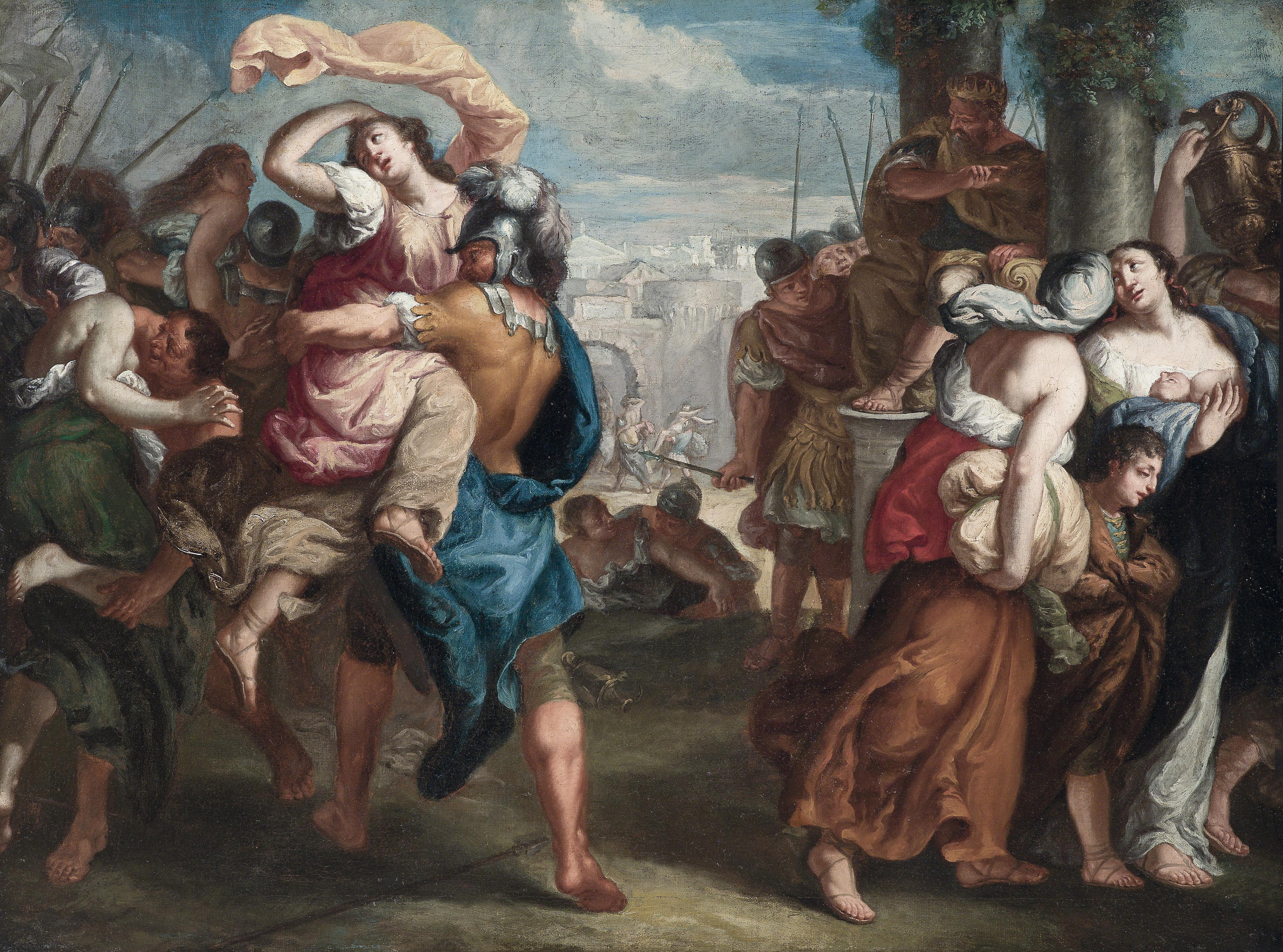
Attributed to Theodoor van Thulden (17th c.)

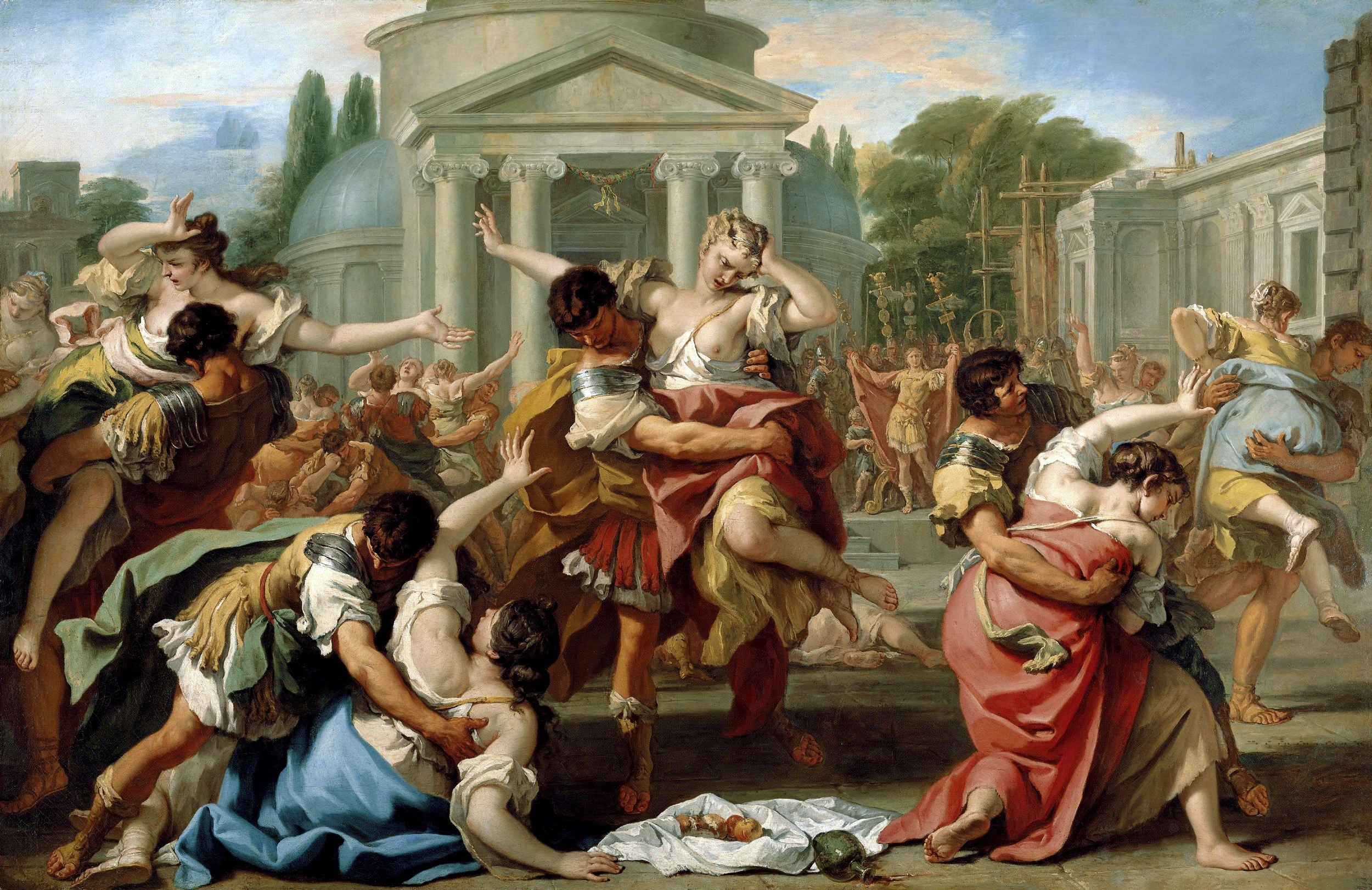
Sebastiano Ricci (c. 1700)

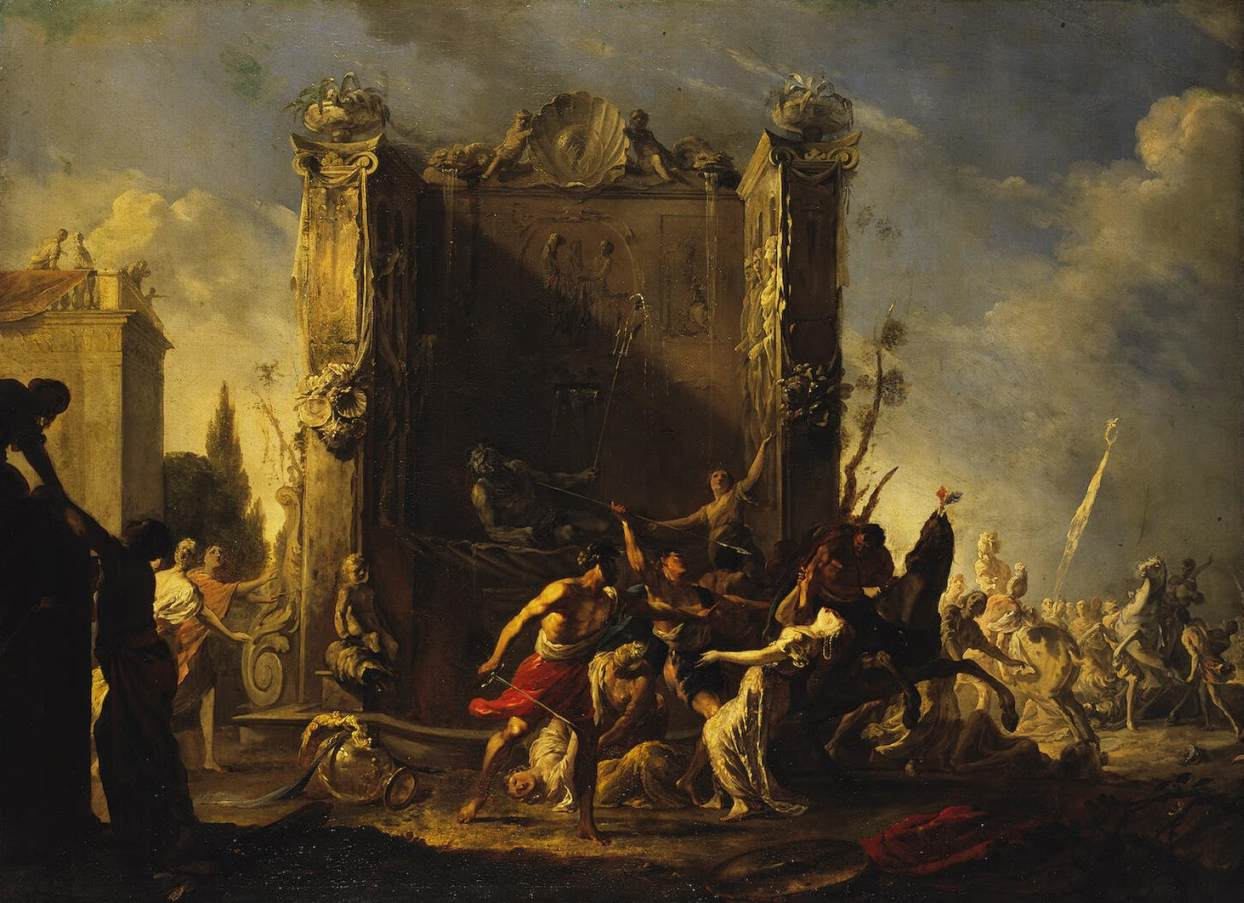
Johann Heinrich Schönfeld (1640)

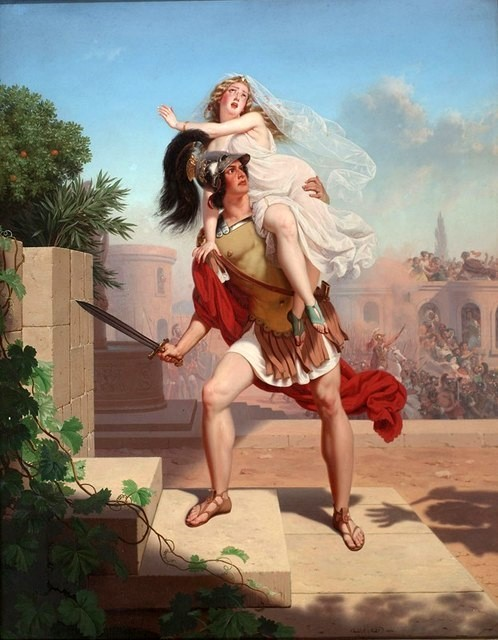
Charles Christian Nahl (1870)

=== Tarpeia ===
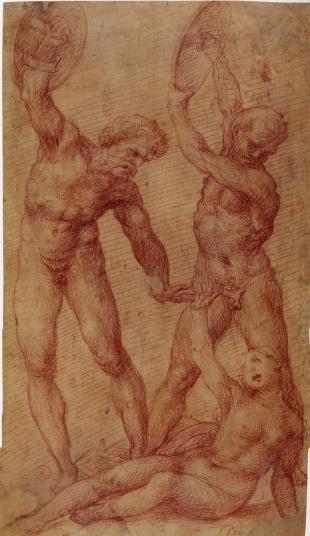
The Vestal Virgin Tarpeia Beaten by Tatius’ soldiers Il Sodoma (16th c.)

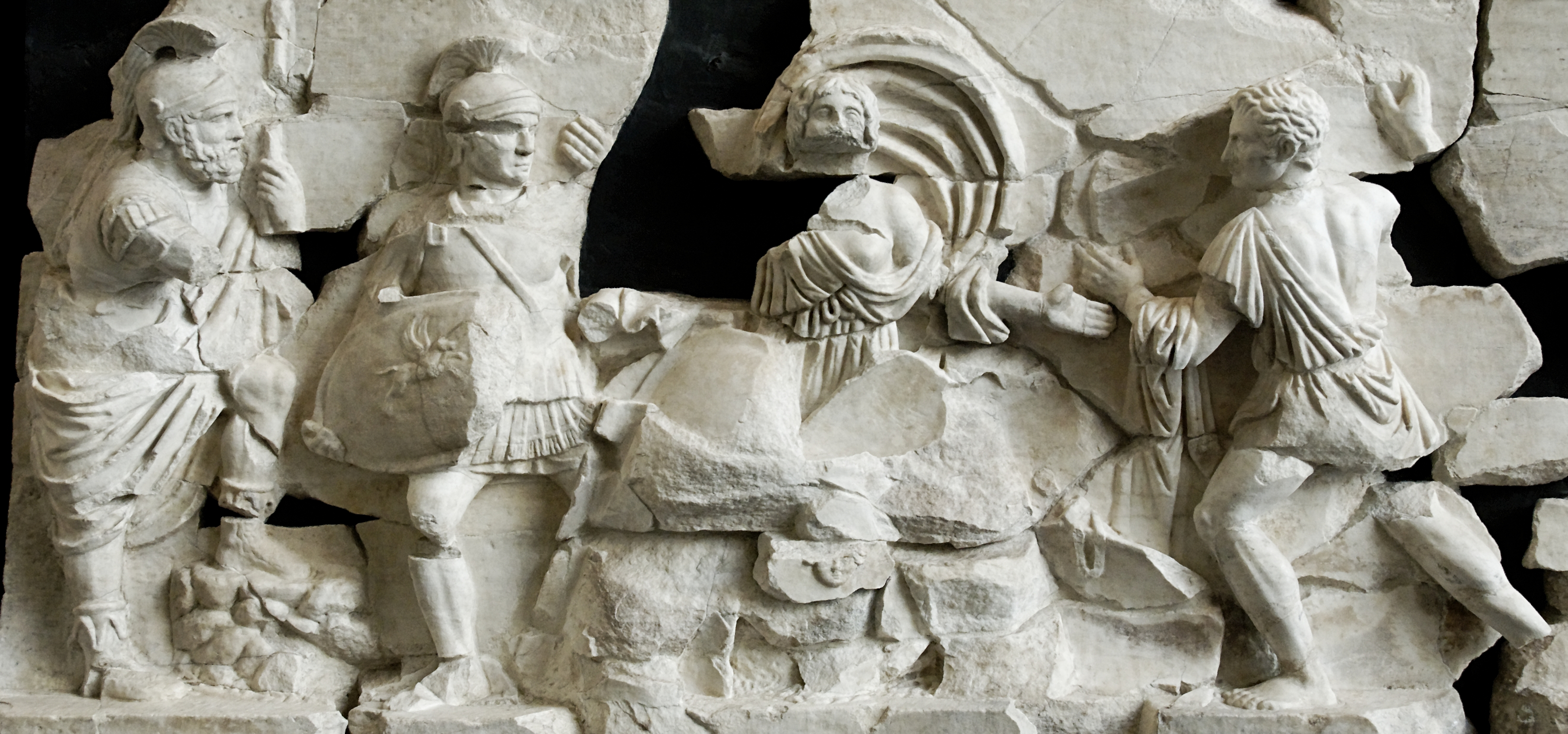
Tarpeia's punishment, Pentelic marble fragment from the Frieze of the Basilica Aemilia (100 BC – 100 AD)

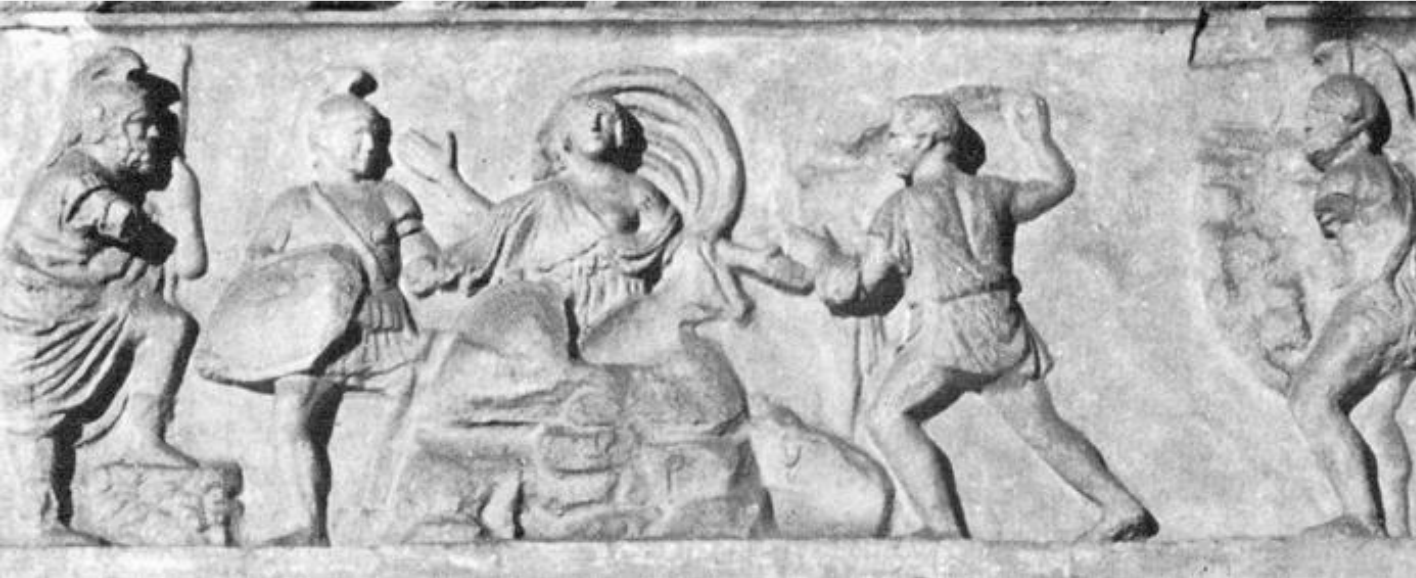
Reconstruction of Basilica Aemilia Frieze marble fragment

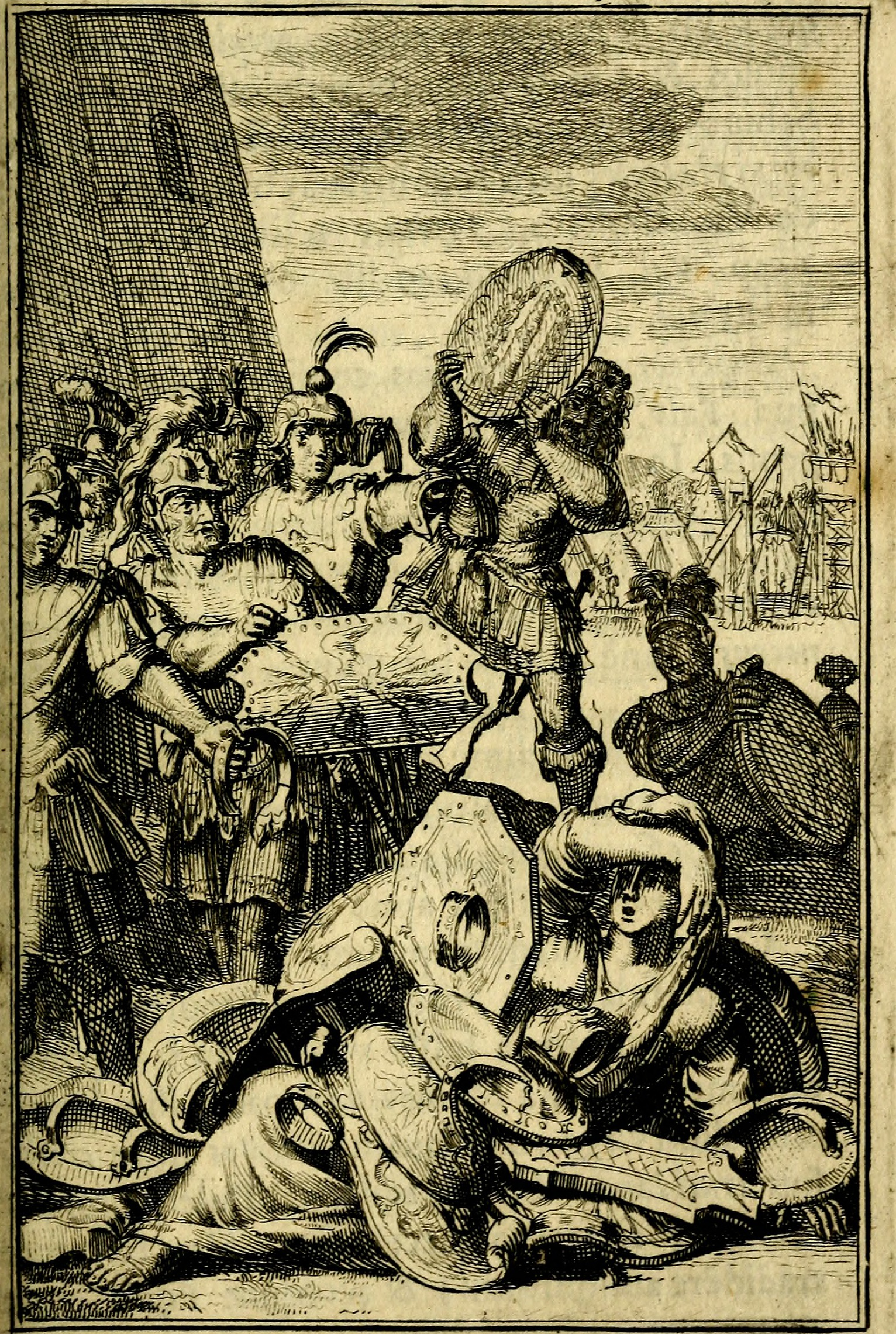
Tarpeia, Illustration from Pictura loquens "the Heroic Accounts of Hadrian Schoonebeeck" (1695) (14751427905)

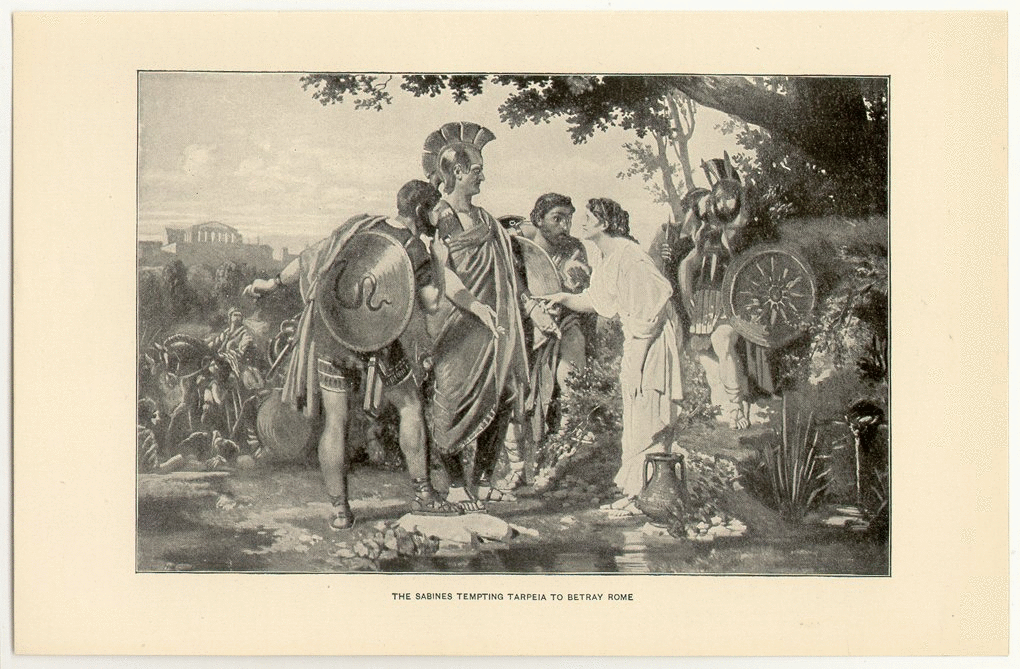
Tarpeia conspires with Tatius in an illustration from The story of the Romans by Hélène Adeline Guerber (1896)

=== Hersilia ===
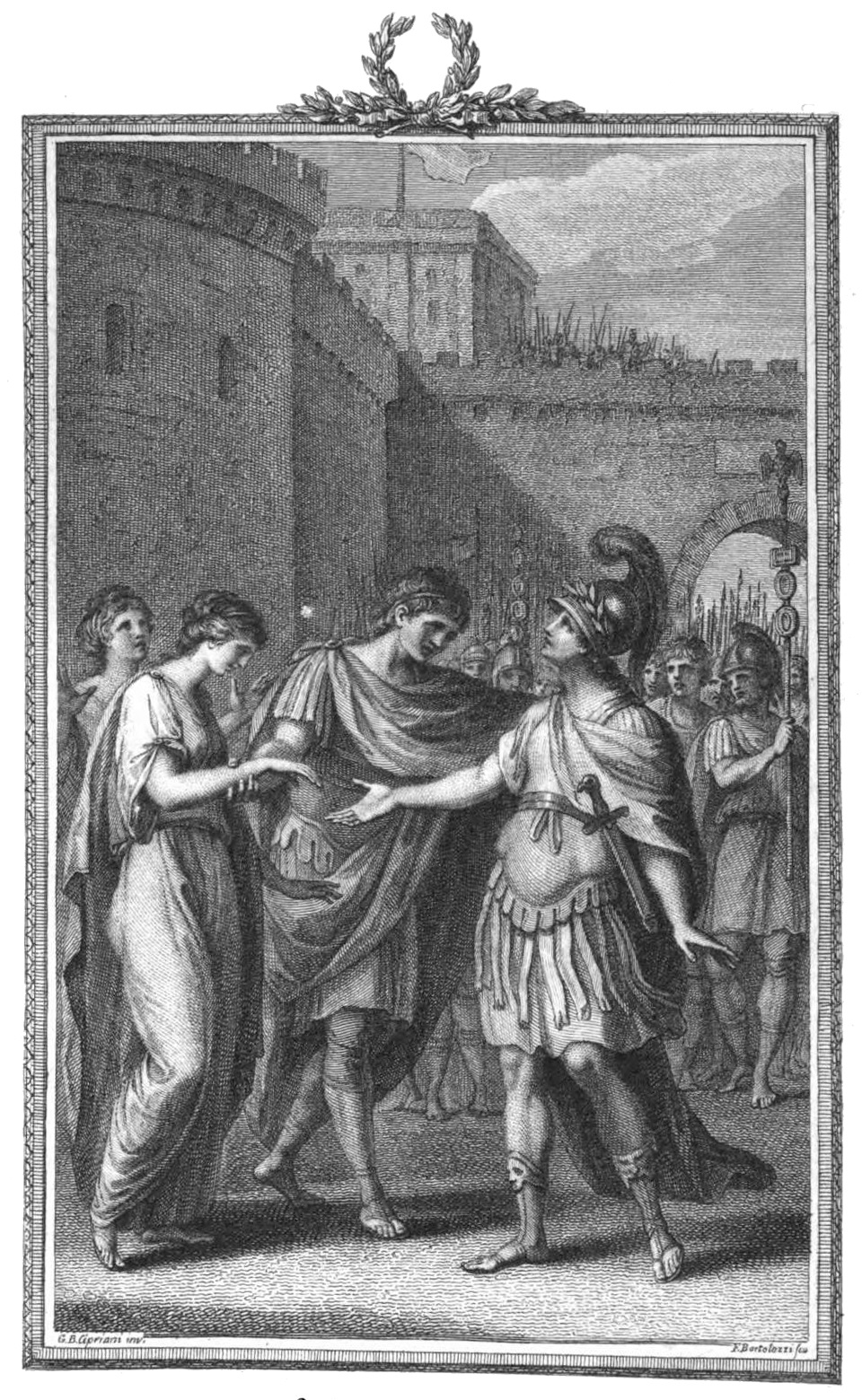
Print from Romolo ed Ersilia, final scene, Act 3, Artist;: Giovanni Battista Cipriani, Engraver: Francesco Bartolozzi (1781)

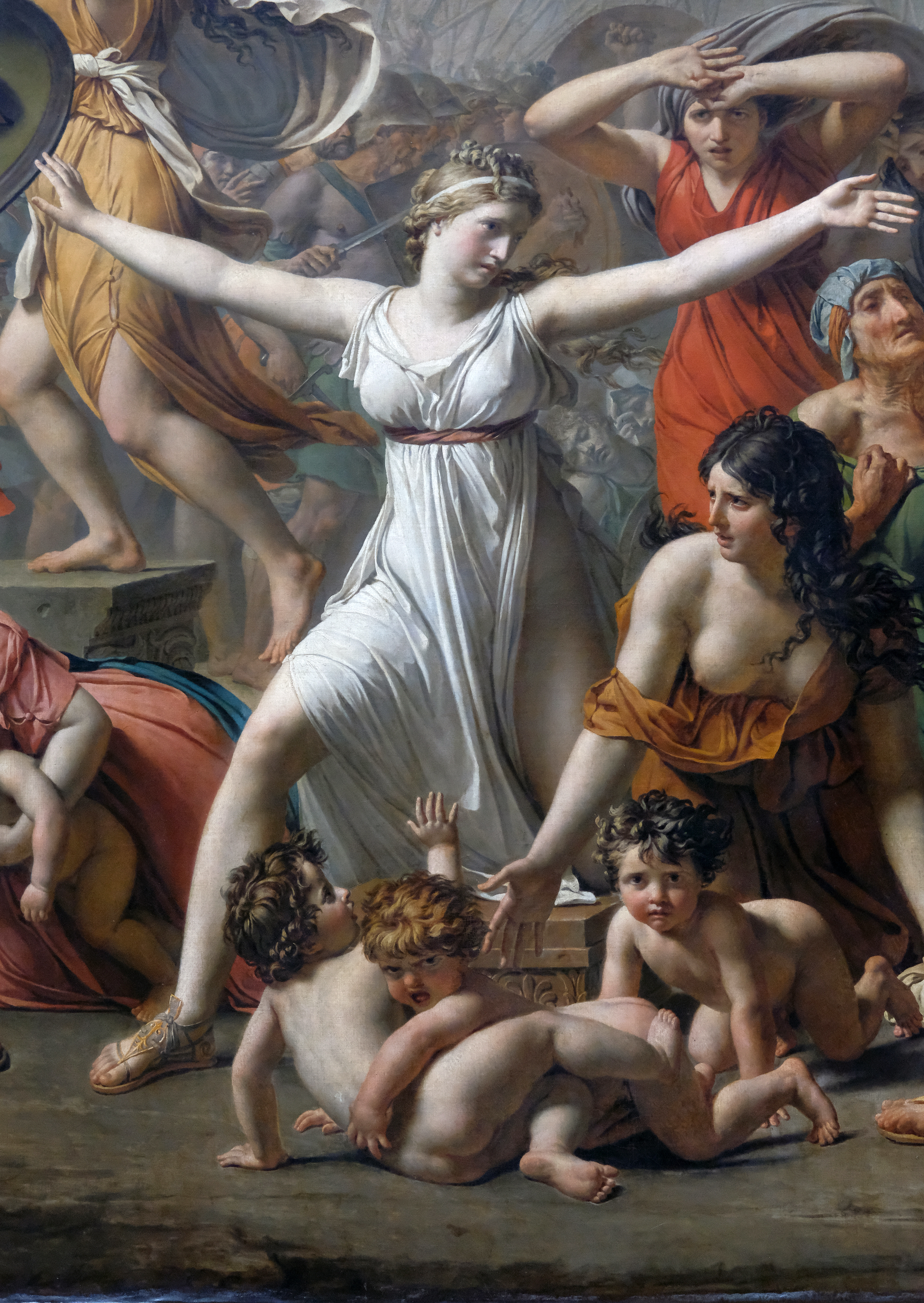
Hersilia from a detail of Les Sabines "The Intervention of the Sabine Women", Jacques-Louis David (1799)

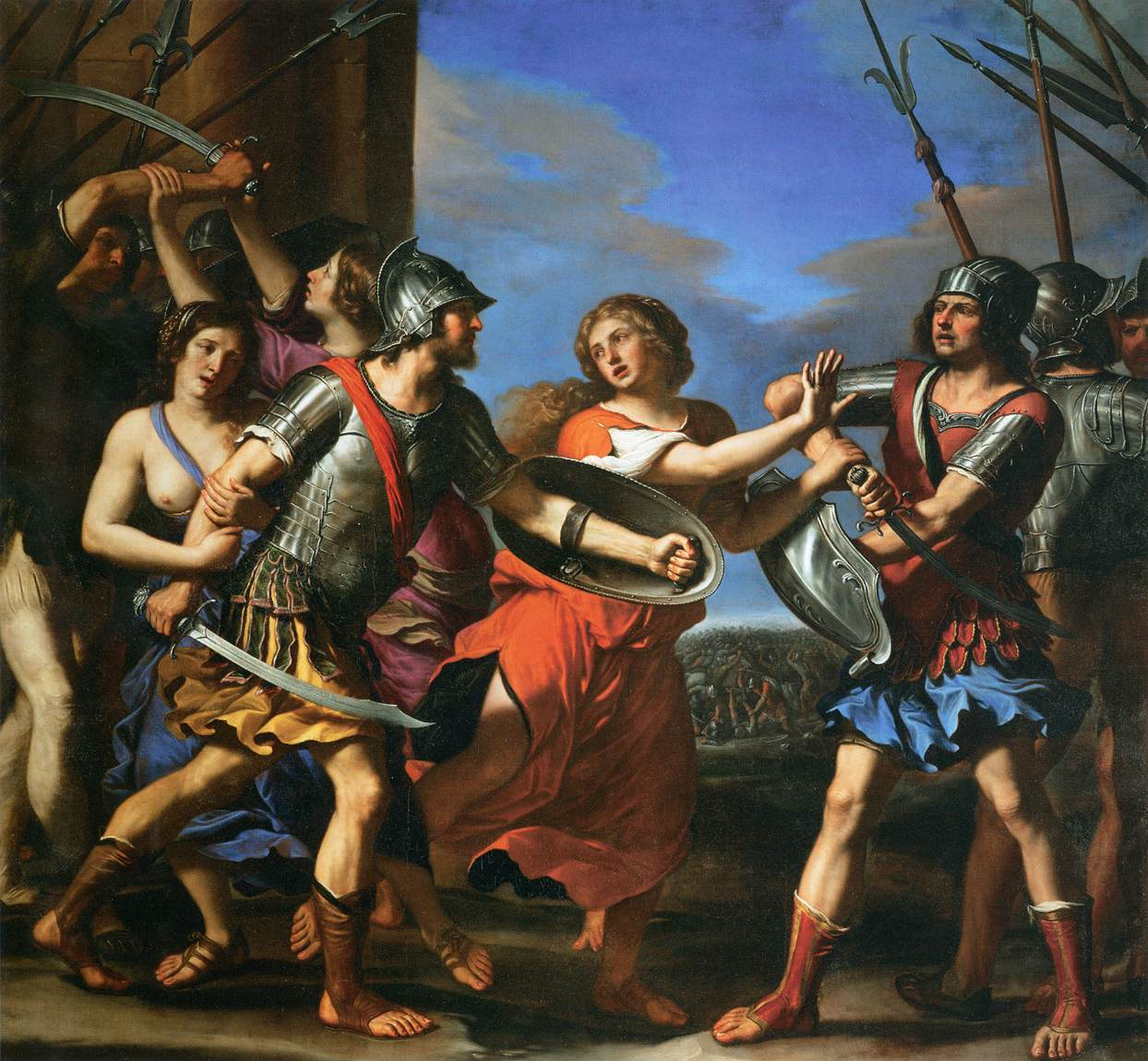
Hersilia Separating Romulus and Tatius, Guercino (1645)

=== Death of Tatius ===
The subject for the 1788 Prix de Rome was the death of Tatius (La mort de Tatius). Garnier won the contest.

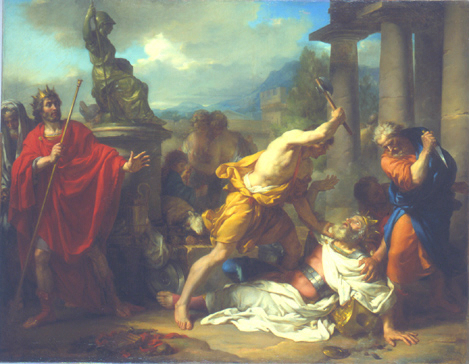
Version by Étienne-Barthélémy Garnier, now in the École nationale supérieure des beaux-arts, Paris.

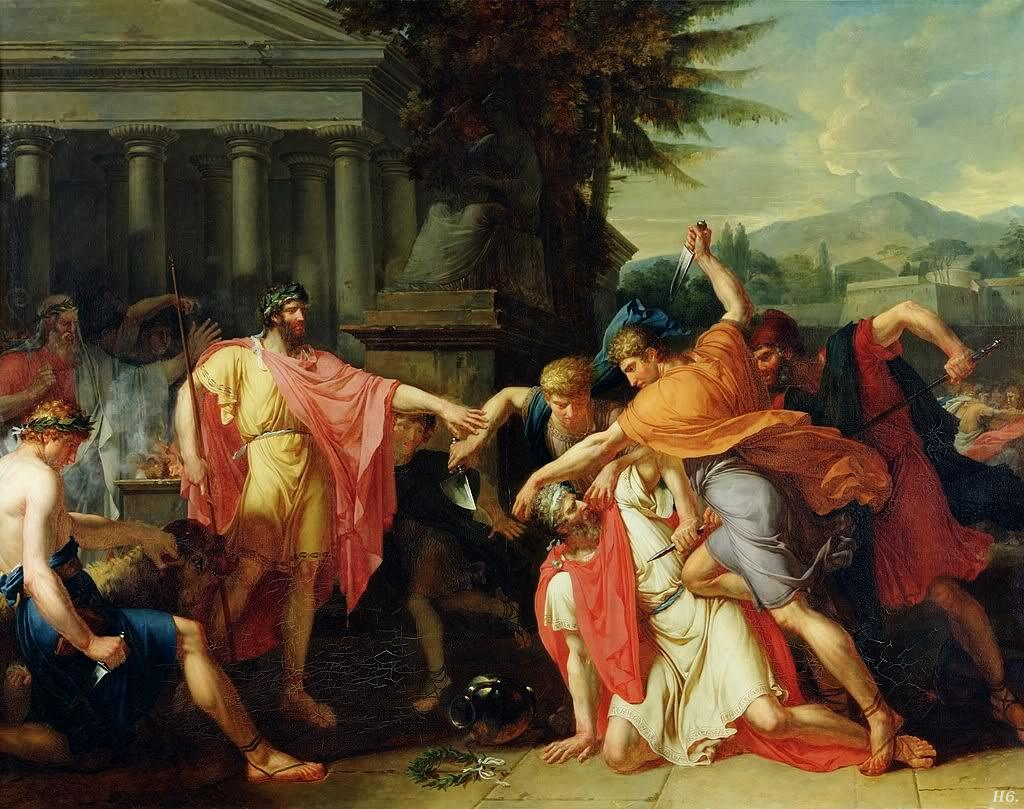
The Death of Tatius by Girodet, now in the Musée des Beaux-Arts d'Angers.

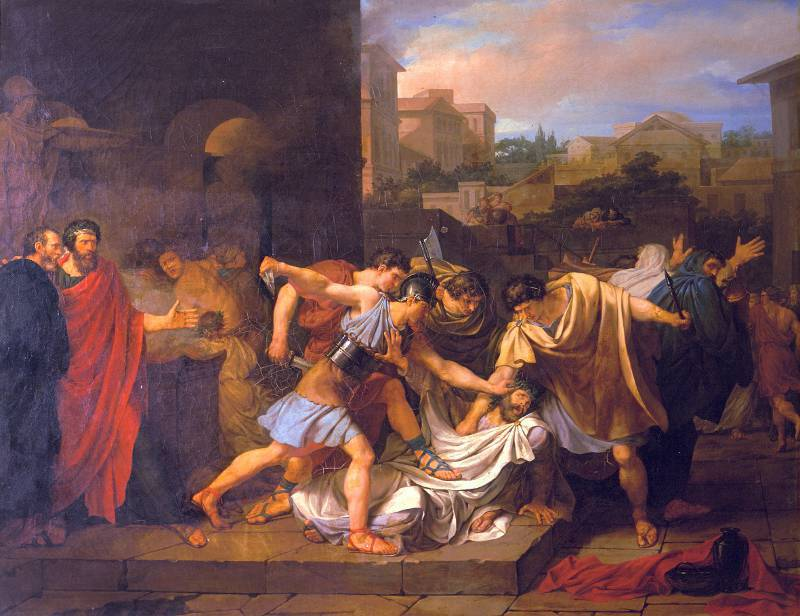
Version by Jacques Réattu, now in the Musée Réattu, Arles.

=== Death of Romulus ===
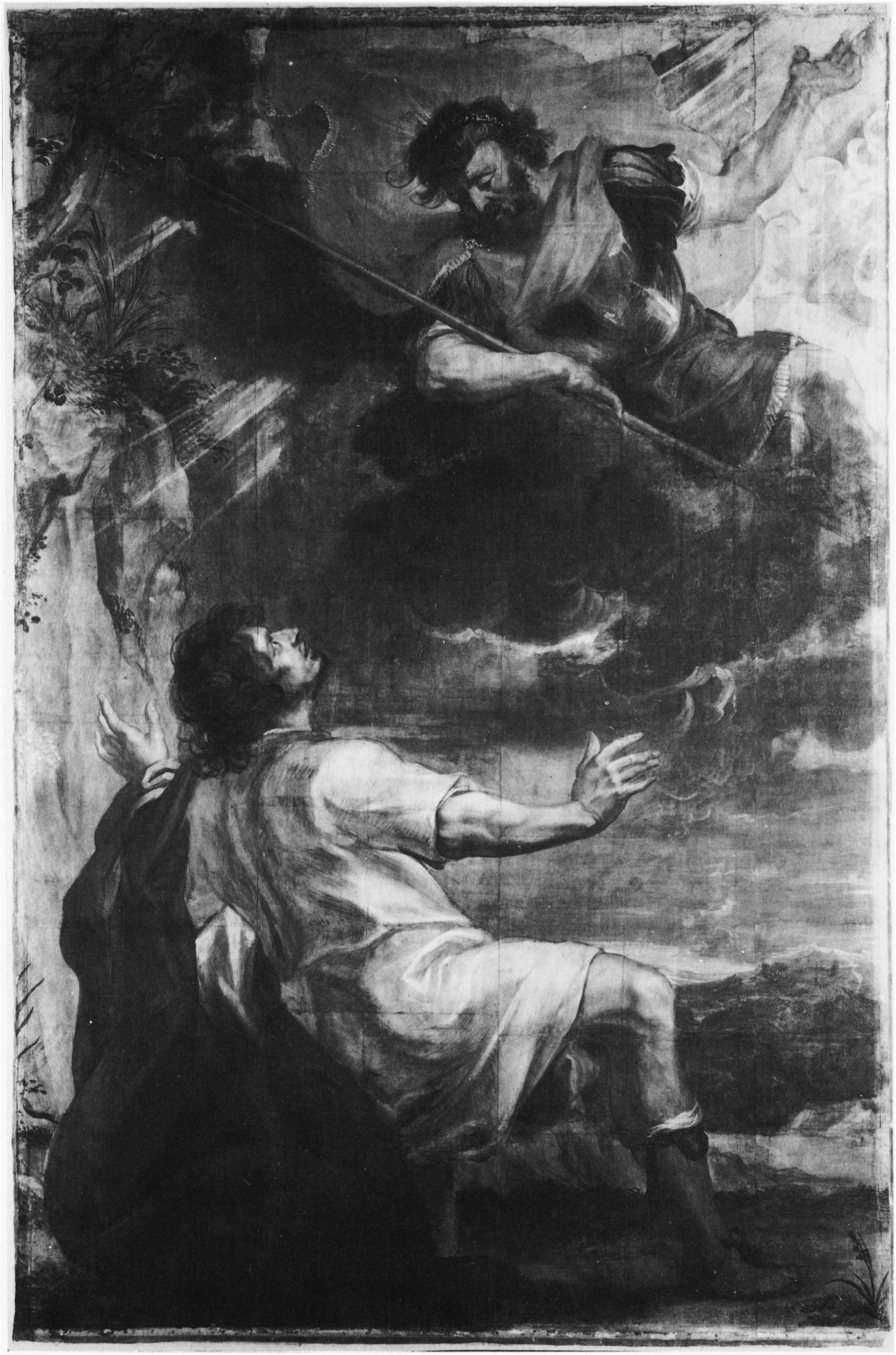
"Apparition of Romulus before Proculus", Rubens (17th c.)

== See also ==
- Evander of Pallene
- Hersilia
- List of people who disappeared mysteriously (pre-1910)
- Proculus Julius
- Legendary progenitor

== Bibliography ==
- Bensch, Matthias Joachim (2023). Held im Bild. Zur visuellen Konstruktion heroischer Figuren im Imperium Romanum anhand von Darstellungen des Aeneas und des Romulus [Hero in the Image. On the visual construction of heroic figures in the Roman Empire based on depictions of Aeneas and Romulus]. Rahden: Verlag Marie Leidorf. ISBN 978-3-89646-675-4.
- Cook, John Granger (2018). Empty Tomb, Apotheosis, Resurrection. p. 263. doi:10.1628/978-3-16-156584-7. ISBN 9783161565847.
- Cornell, T. (1995), The Beginnings of Rome: Italy and Rome from the Bronze Age to the Punic Wars (c. 1000–264 BC), London: Routledge, ISBN 978-1-136-75495-1
- Leonard, Benjamin; Zorich, Zach; Urbanus, Jason; Brown, Marley; Lobell, Jarrett A.; Powell, Eric A.; Weiss, Daniel (2021). "Archaeology magazine's TOP 10 DISCOVERIES OF 2020* *AND THE DECADE". Archaeology. 74 (1): 24–35. ISSN 0003-8113. JSTOR 27056816.
- Metcalfe, Tom (2020-02-21). "Tomb of Rome's mythical founder Romulus unearthed". Live Science. Archived from the original on August 15, 2025.
- Redazione ANSA (2020-02-17). "Hypogeum with sarcophagus found in Forum - Arts Culture and Style - Ansa.it". Agenzia ANSA. Archived from the original on February 17, 2020.
- Rodríguez Mayorgas, Ana (2010), "Romulus, Aeneas and the Cultural Memory of the Roman Republic" (PDF), Athenaeum, 98 (1): 89–109
- Willan, Philip (2020-02-18). "Tomb in Roman forum may be the burial place of city's founder Romulus". www.thetimes.com. Archived from the original on October 18, 2025.
- Witcher, Robert (2020), "Empty tombs.", Antiquity, vol. 94, no. 374, Cambridge University Press
- Wu, Katherine (2020-02-17). "Hypogeum with sarcophagus found in Forum - Arts Culture and Style - Ansa.it". Agenzia ANSA (in Italian). Archived from the original on February 21, 2020.

=== Ancient Sources ===
- Dionysius of Halicarnassus, Roman Antiquities i & ii.
- Livy, History of Rome i–v.

Legendary titles
New creation	King of Rome; 753–717	Succeeded by Numa Pompilius
Preceded by Numitor	King of Alba Longa	Succeeded by Numa Pompilius
