= Murus Romuli =

8th-century BC fortifications around the Palatine Hill in Rome, Italy

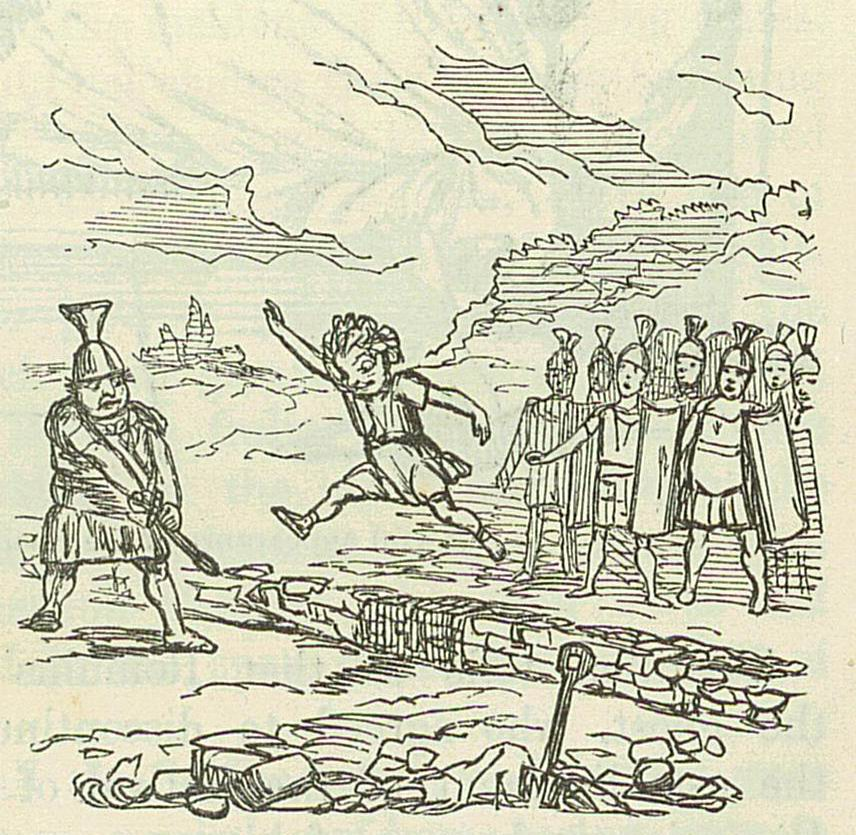
Remus jumping over Romulus's wall in the 1850 Comic History of Rome

Murus Romuli (Latin for "the Wall of Romulus") is the name given to a wall built to protect the Palatine Hill, the centermost of the Seven Hills of Rome, in one of the oldest parts of the city of Rome. Ancient tradition holds that this wall was built by the Roman culture hero Romulus.

== Traditional accounts ==
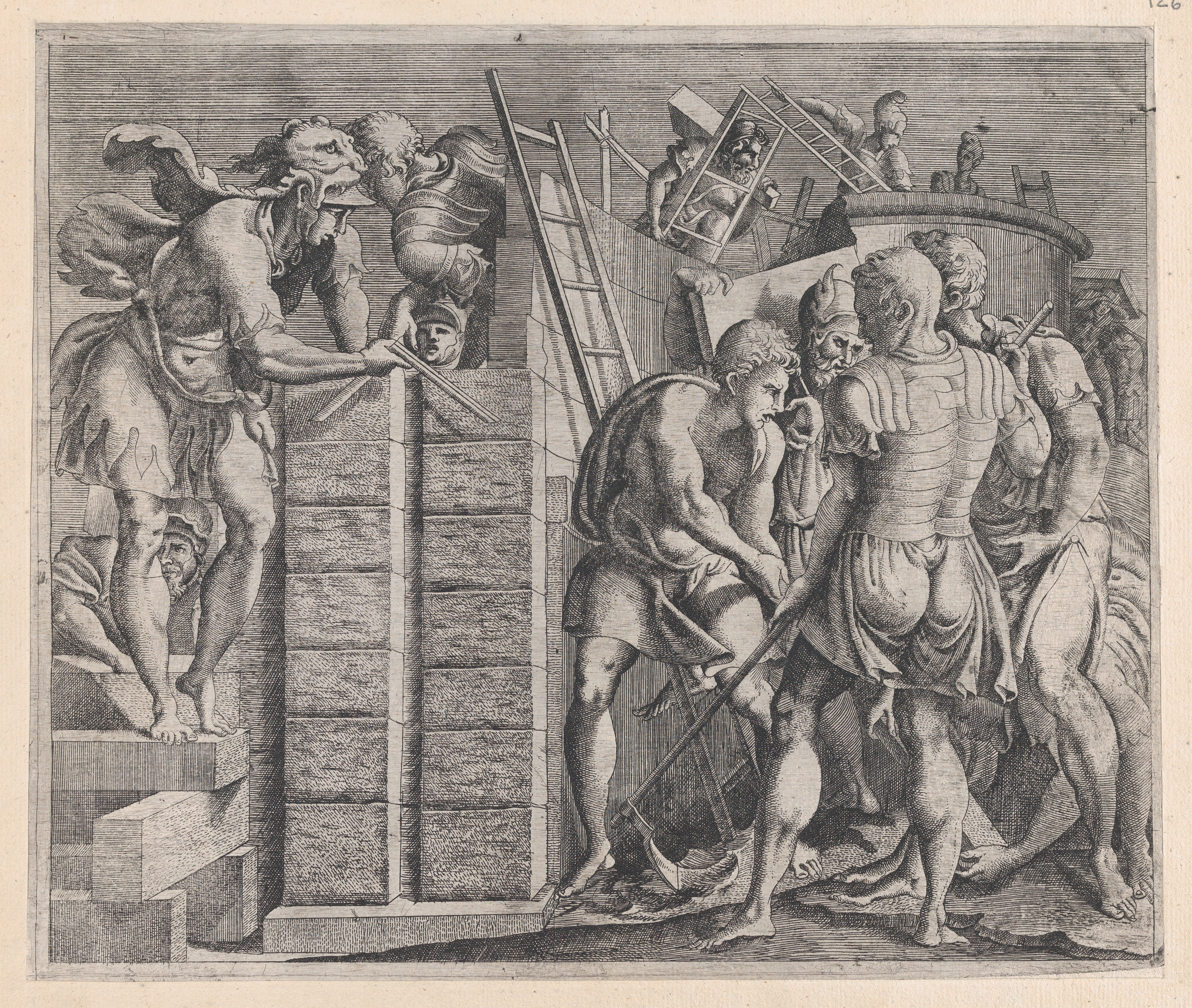
A 16th-century imagining of Romulus and Remus building Rome's walls

The Murus Romuli as remembered by ancient historians is described by Rodolfo Lanciani:

The text most frequently quoted in reference to the Murus Romuli is that of Tacitus, according to which the furrow ploughed by the hero — the sulcus primigenius — started from a point in the Forum Boarium, marked in later times by the bronze Bull of Myron; and followed the valley between the Palatine and the Aventine as far as the altar of Consus, the valley between the Palatine and the Cælian as far as the Curiæ Veteres, the east slope of the hill as far as the Sacellum Larum. The same historian says that the Ara Maxima of Hercules was included within the furrow, and Dionysius states that Vesta's temple was outside it. The furrow followed the foot of the cliffs or slopes of the Palatine, its course being marked with stone cippi. Others affirm that the city of Romulus was square (τετράγωνος — Roma Quadrata). The truth is that neither the walls nor the pomerium of Romulus can be said to make a square; that a line drawn from beyond the Ara Maxima to the Ara Consi cannot be said to go "along the foot of the cliffs of the Palatine" (per ima montis Palatini); that the valley in those days was covered with water, deep enough to be navigated by canoes, so that neither a furrow could be ploughed through it, nor stone cippi set up to mark the line of the furrow. Moreover, the same marshes extended on the southeast side as far as the Curiæ Veteres, on the northwest as far as the Temple of Vesta; and the shape of the Palatine walls was rather trapezoid, like that of a terramara of the valley of the Po, than square like an Etruscan templum; while, lastly, the name of Roma Quadrata did not belong to the city on the hill, but to the altar described in Pagan and Christian Rome, p. 70, which stood in front of the Temple of Apollo.

Though most often believed to be purely a figure of myth, Romulus is believed by some scholars, such as Andrea Carandini, to have been an actual historical figure.

== Modern archaeology ==
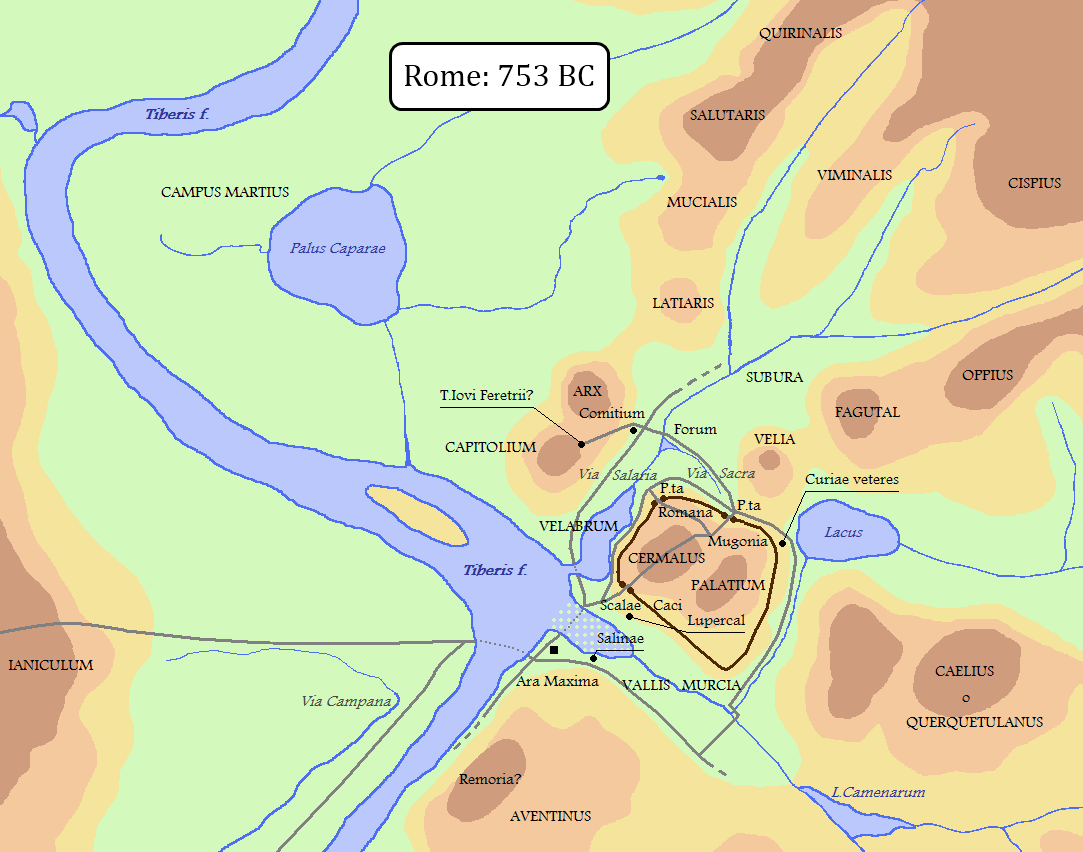
Conjectural path of the earliest Roman walls, with the conditions of the surrounding land in the mid-8th century

In 1988, the remains of an early defensive wall were found on the north slope of the Palatine Hill. Archaeologists excavating the site contended that the wall and other nearby finds indicate that Rome emerged as a dynamic society by at least the 7th and 6th centuries BC, significantly earlier than had been previously calculated. As of the 2010s, the earliest evidence of any settlement in the area dates to c. 1000 BC with large-scale organization evidenced by the establishment of the Esquiline Hill's necropolis and a clay and timber wall at the bottom of the Palatine Hill dating to the mid-8th century BC. The swampy surrounding territories were not drained until the mid-7th century BC.

== See also ==
- Roma Quadrata, the "Square Rome" supposedly enclosed by Romulus's wall
- Founding of Rome
