= Roma quadrata =

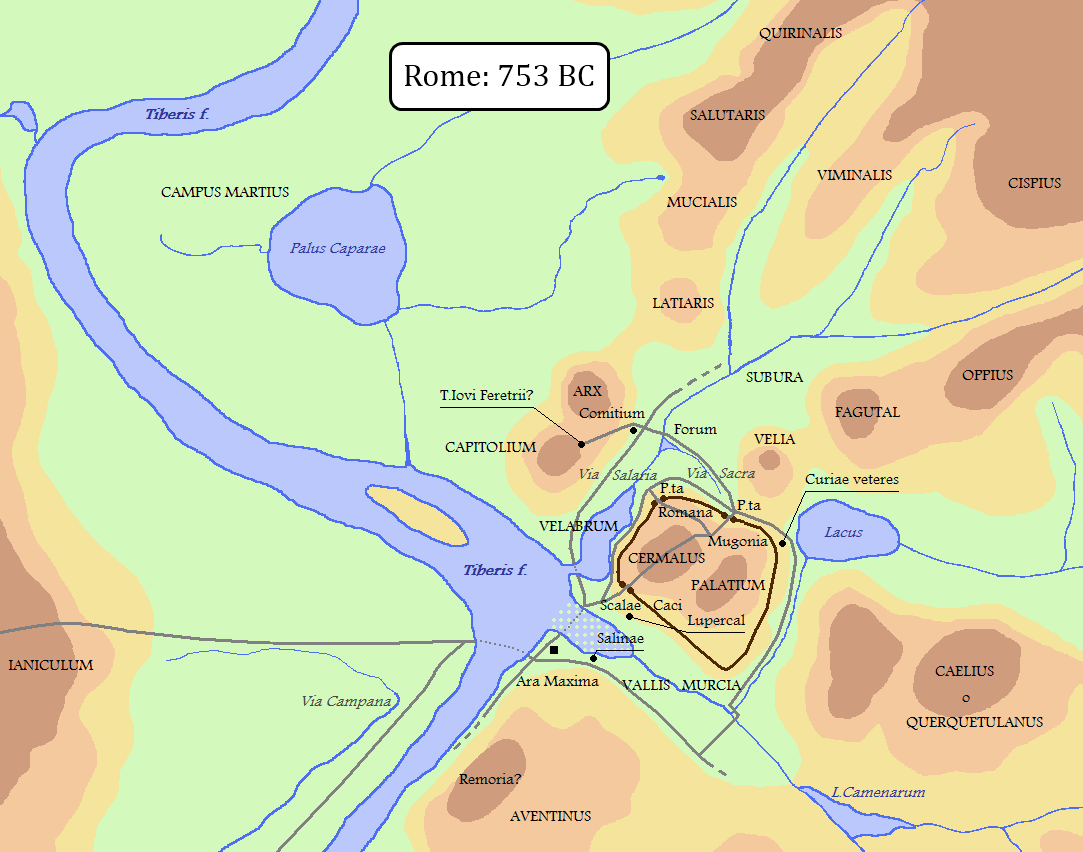
A hypothetical location of the walls of Roma quadrata on a topographical map of the area of Rome c. 753 BC

Roma quadrata (Latin; lit. 'square Rome'; Ancient Greek: Τετράγωνος Ῥώμη, Tetrágōnos Rhṓmē) was an area or structure within the original pomerium of the ancient city of Rome, probably the Palatine Hill with both its Palatium and Cermalus peaks and their slopes. It apparently dated to the earliest stage of the city's formation. The original meaning had already become obscure to both Latin and Greek historians by the late Roman Republic (2nd century BC).

== See also ==
- Murus Romuli – the walls of Roma quadrata
- Founding of Rome
